= List of the prehistoric life of Alabama =

This list of the prehistoric life of Alabama contains the various prehistoric life-forms whose fossilized remains have been reported from within the US state of Alabama.

== Precambrian ==
The Paleobiology Database records no known occurrences of Precambrian fossils in Alabama.

== Paleozoic ==
=== Selected Paleozoic taxa of Alabama ===
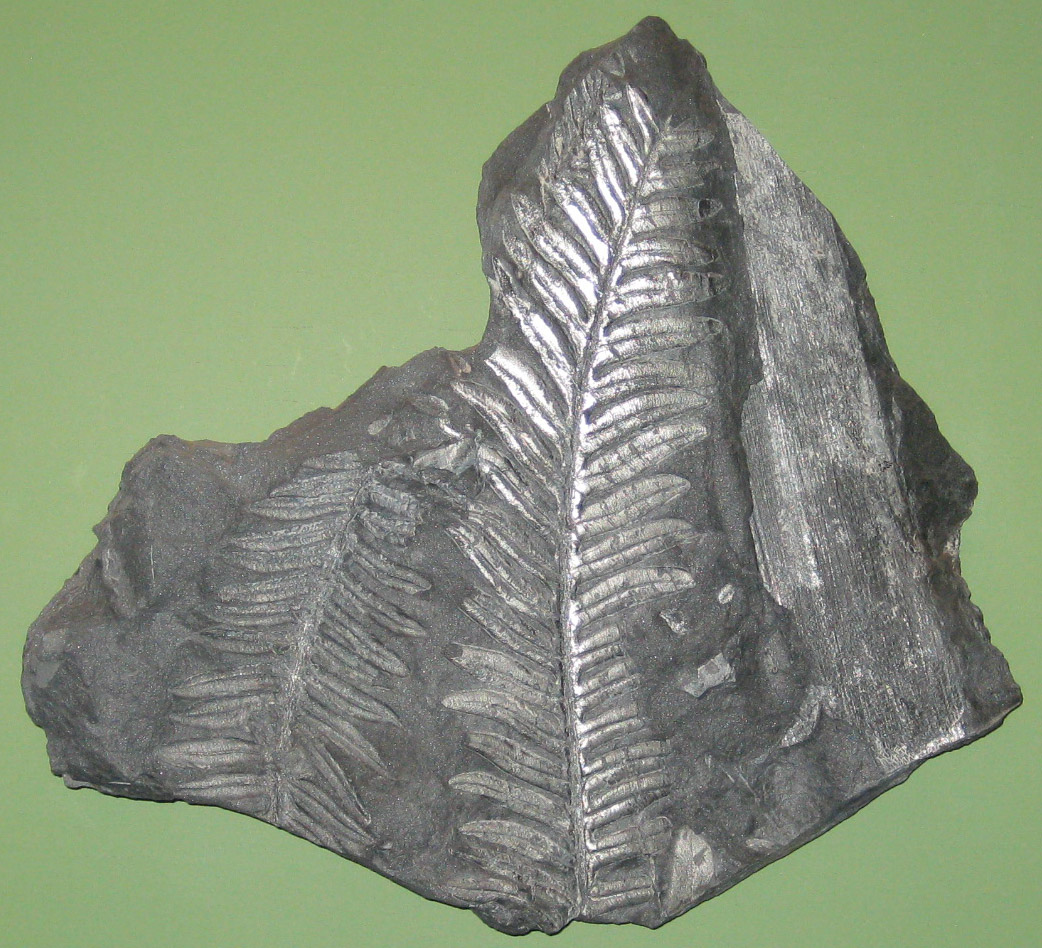
- Fossilized fronds of the Carboniferous-Early Cretaceous seed fern Alethopteris
  †Alethopteris
  - †Alethopteris lonchitica
  - †Alethopteris valida
- †Amphiscapha – tentative report
- †Amplexopora
- †Annularia
  - †Annularia radiata
  - †Annularia sphenophylloides
- †Arenicolites
- †Artisia
- †Atrypa
- †Aviculopecten
- †Bimuria
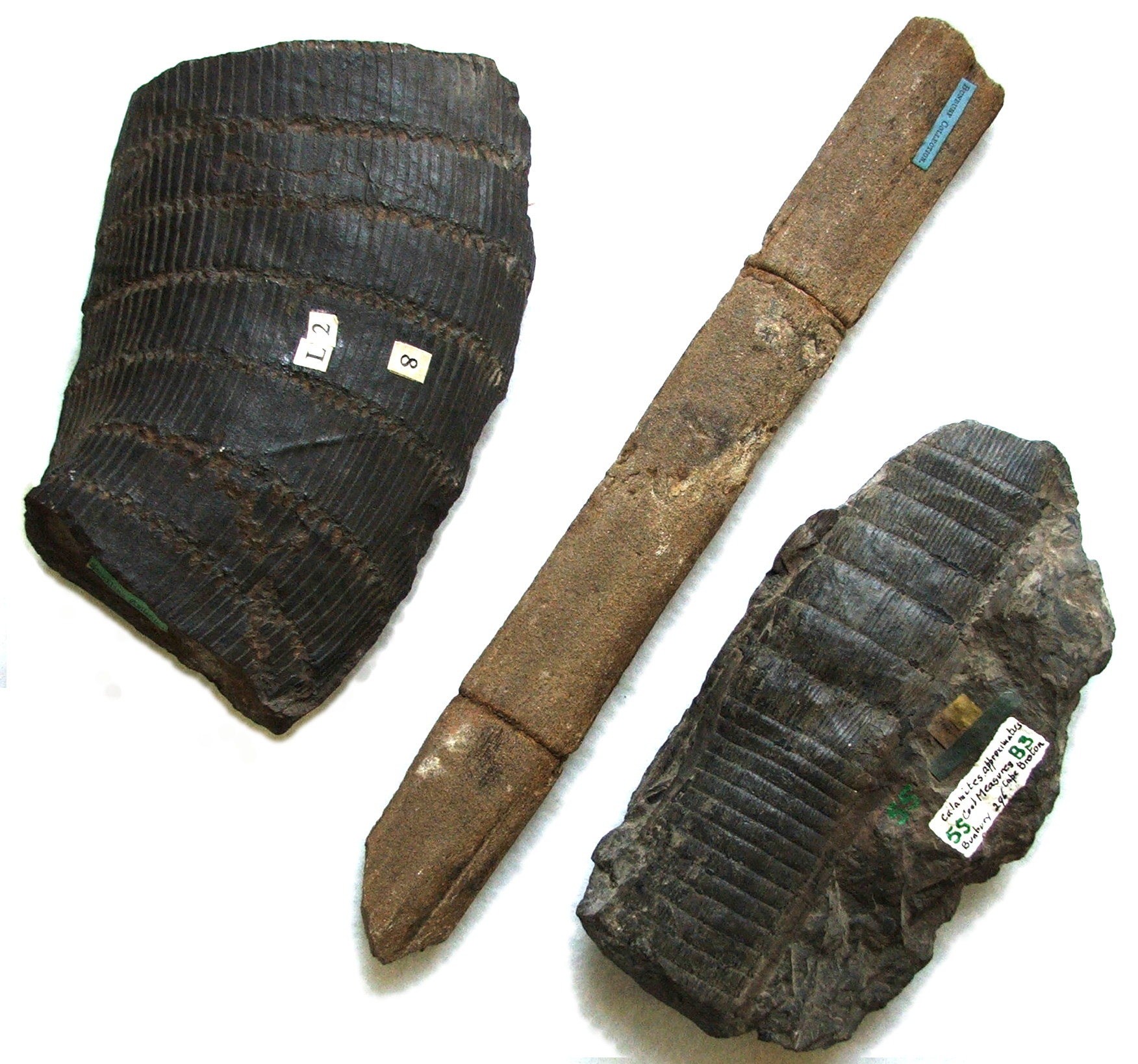
- Fossilized stems from the Carboniferous-Permian horsetail relative Calamites
  †Calamites
  - †Calamites cisti
  - †Calamites goepperti
  - †Calamites suckowi
  - †Calamites suckowii
  - †Calamites undulatus
- †Campbelloceras
- †Caninia
- †Carinamala
- †Cavusgnathus
- †Cedaria
- †Christiania
- †Cladodus – report made of unidentified related form or using admittedly obsolete nomenclature
- †Cleiothyridina
- †Composita
  - †Composita subquadrata
- †Conocardium
- †Cordaites
- †Cornulites
- †Crania
- †Crepipora
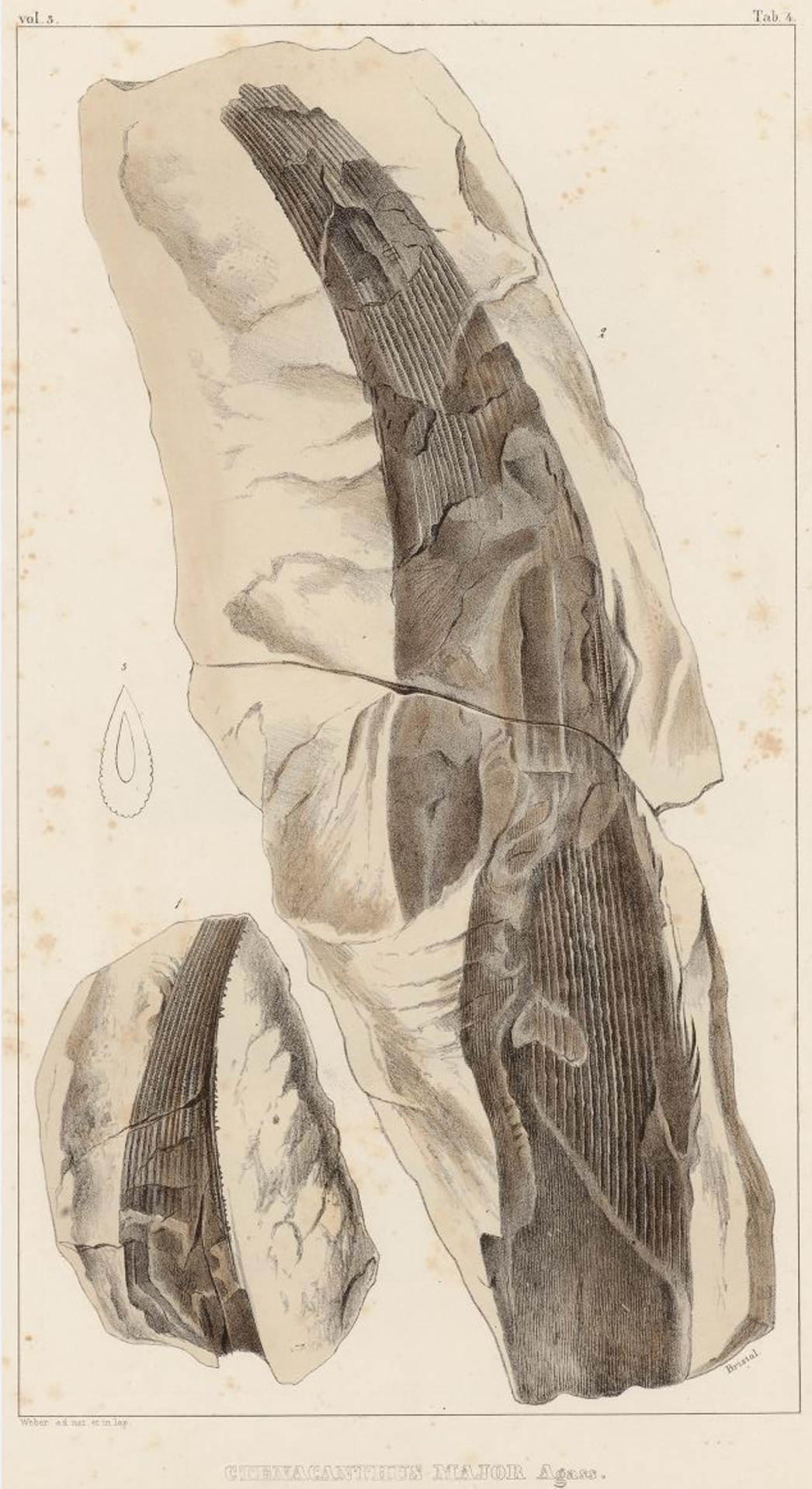
- Fossil of the Carboniferous shark Ctenacanthus
  †Ctenacanthus
  - †Ctenacanthus elegans
- †Ctenerpeton
- †Cyclopteris
- †Cystodictya
- †Decadocrinus
- †Deiracephalus
- †Dicoelosia
- †Diplichnites
  - †Diplichnites gouldi
- †Dolorthoceras
- †Fenestella
- †Girvanella
- †Glyptagnostus
  - †Glyptagnostus reticulatus
- †Gnathodus
  - †Gnathodus bilineatus
- †Hindeodus
  - †Hindeodus minutus
- †Innitagnostus
- †Kingstonia
  - †Kingstonia appalachia
- †Kouphichnium
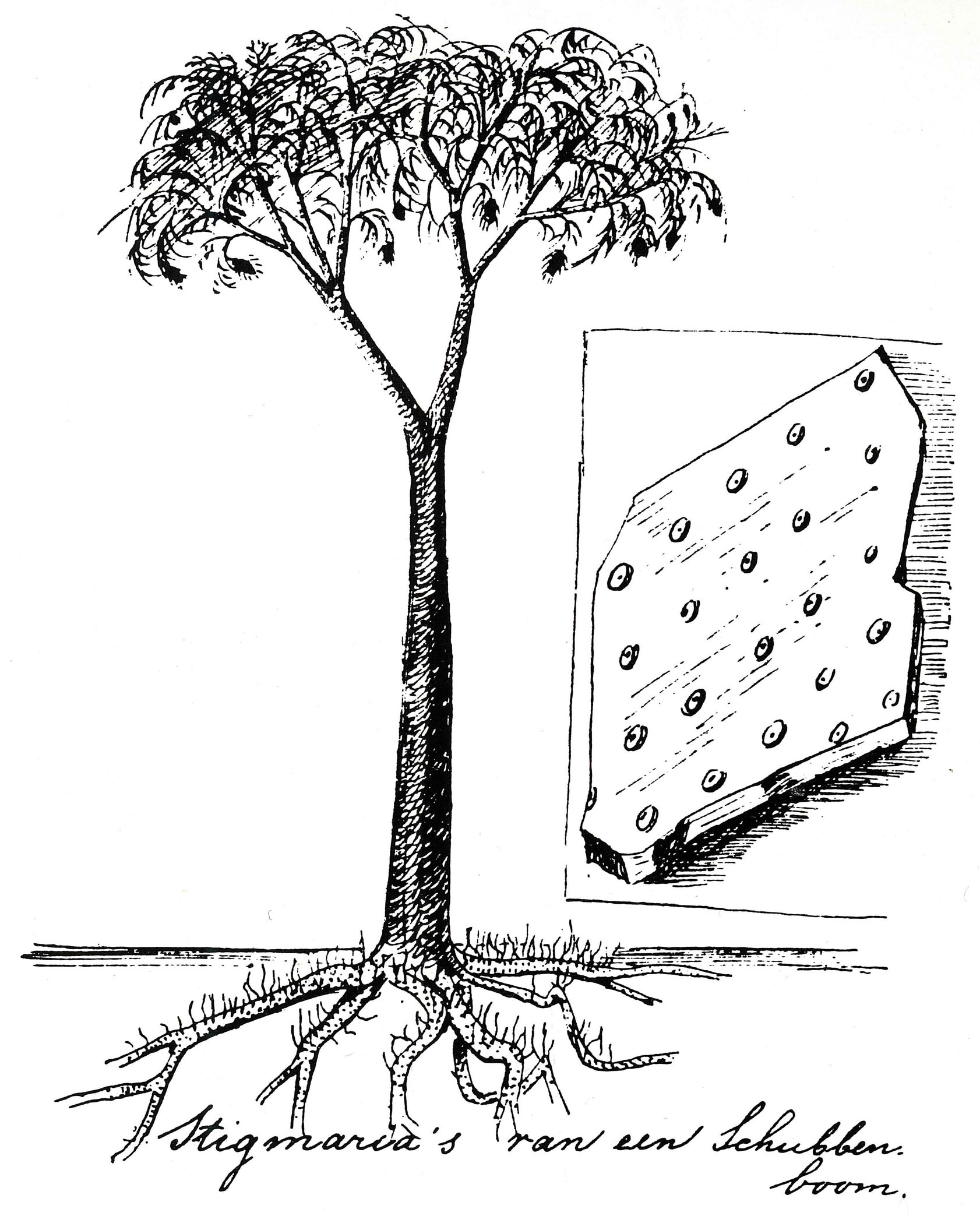
- Restoration of the Carboniferous-Late Triassic club moss relative Lepidodendron. Eli Heimans (1911).
  †Lepidodendron
  - †Lepidodendron aculeatum
  - †Lepidodendron obovatum
- †Lepidostrobus
- †Limnosaurus – type locality for genus
- †Lingulella
  - †Lingulella alabamensis
  - †Lingulella lirata
  - †Lingulella pachyderma
- †Lochriea
- †Lyginopteris
  - †Lyginopteris hoeninghausi
- †Meristina – tentative report
- †Naticopsis
- Nucula
- †Obolus
- †Paladin
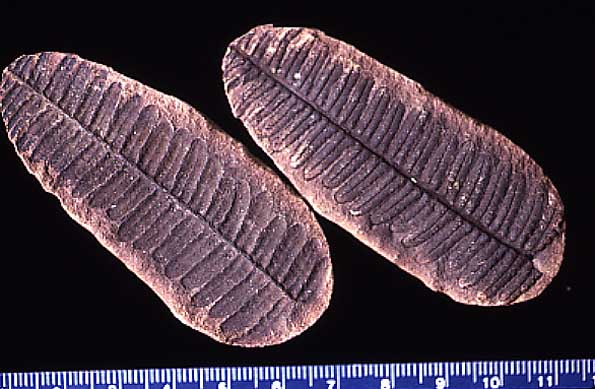
- Fossils of the Late Devonian-Permian fern-like fronds Pecopteris
  †Pecopteris
  - †Pecopteris arborescens
- †Pentremites
  - †Pentremites laminatus
  - †Pentremites tulipaformis
- †Petalodus – tentative report
- †Pinnularia
- †Platyceras
- †Platycrinites
- †Rachis
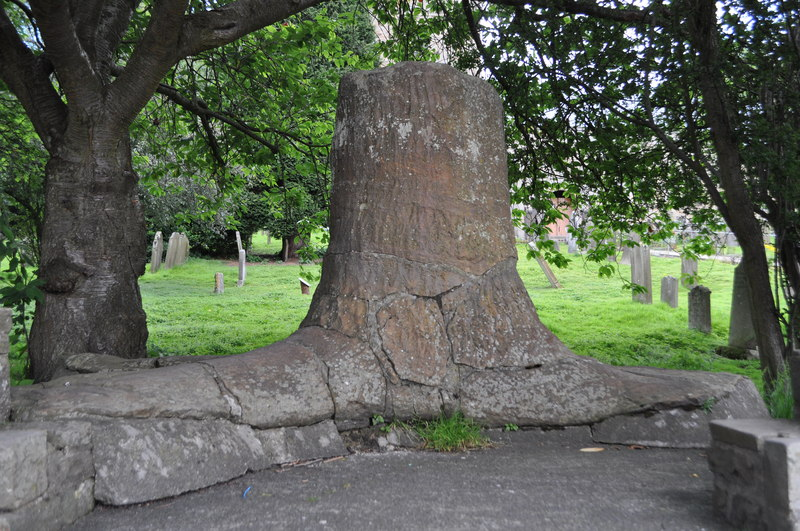
- Fossilized stump of the Carboniferous-Permian club moss relative Sigillaria
  †Sigillaria
  - †Sigillaria elegans
  - †Sigillaria ichthyolepis
  - †Sigillaria scutella
  - †Sigillaria scutellata
- †Skenidioides
- †Solenopora
- †Sphenophyllum
  - †Sphenophyllum cuneifolium
  - †Sphenophyllum emarginatum
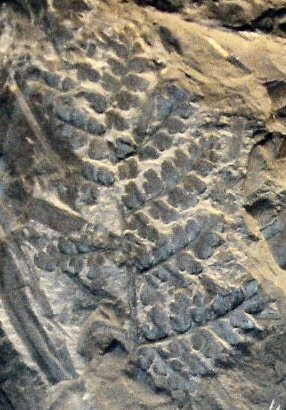
- Fossilized foliage of the Late-Devonian-Cretaceous seed fern Sphenopteris
  †Sphenopteris
  - †Sphenopteris brongniarti
  - †Sphenopteris elegans
  - †Sphenopteris herbacea
  - †Sphenopteris pottsvillea
  - †Sphenopteris pseudocristata
  - †Sphenopteris schatzlarensis
- Spirorbis
- †Treptichnus
- †Undichna

== Mesozoic ==
=== Selected Mesozoic taxa of Alabama ===
- Acirsa
- Acmaea
- †Acteon
- †Agerostrea
- †Albertosaurus
- †Albula
- †Ampullina
- †Ancilla
- †Anomia
- †Anomoeodus
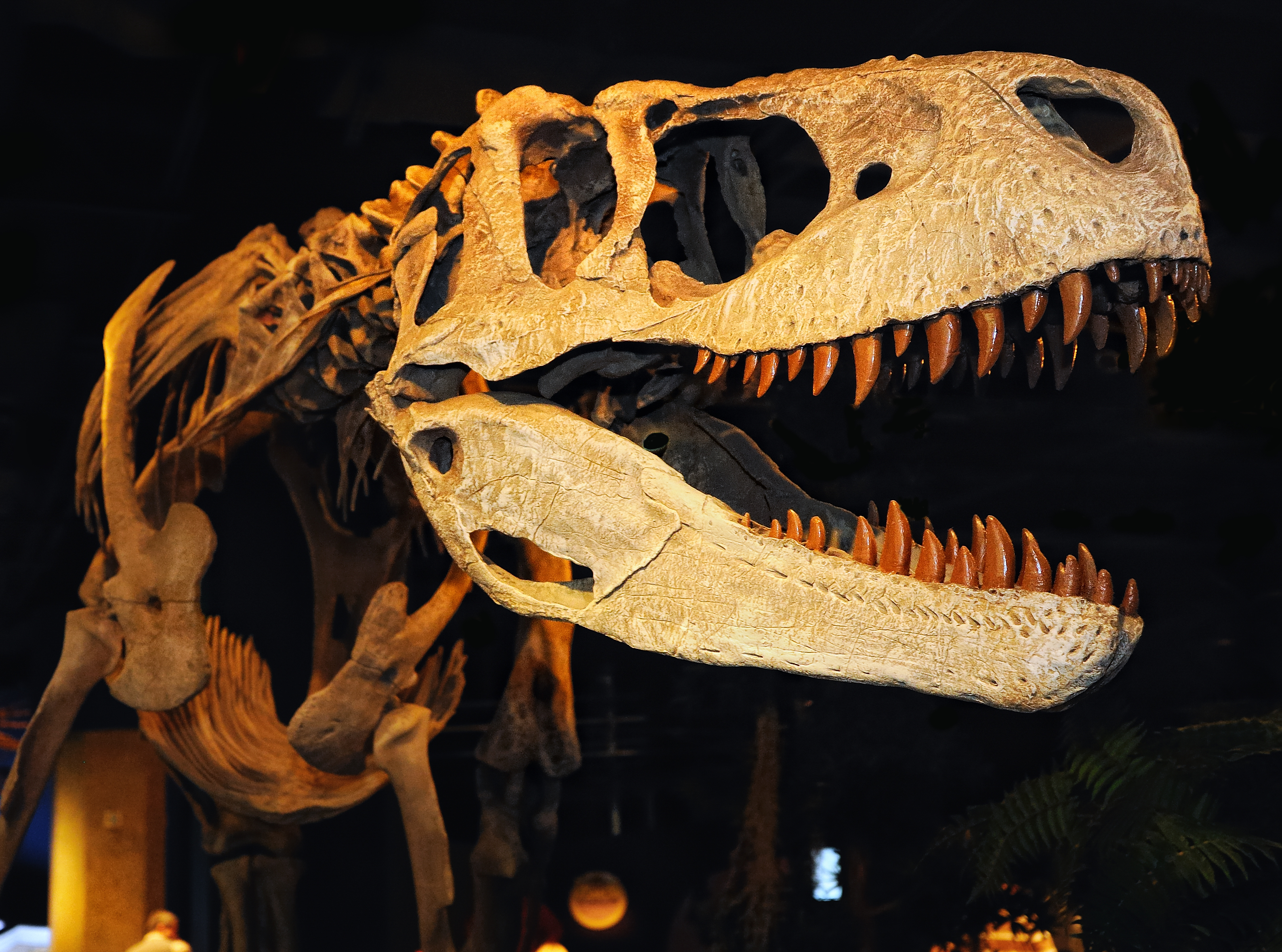
- Fossilized skull and skeleton of the Late Cretaceous primitive tyrannosaur Appalachiosaurus
  †Appalachiosaurus – type locality for genus
  - †Appalachiosaurus montgomeriensis – type locality for species
- Arca
- Architectonica
- Arrhoges
- Astarte
- †Avellana
- †Avitelmessus
  - †Avitelmessus grapsoideus
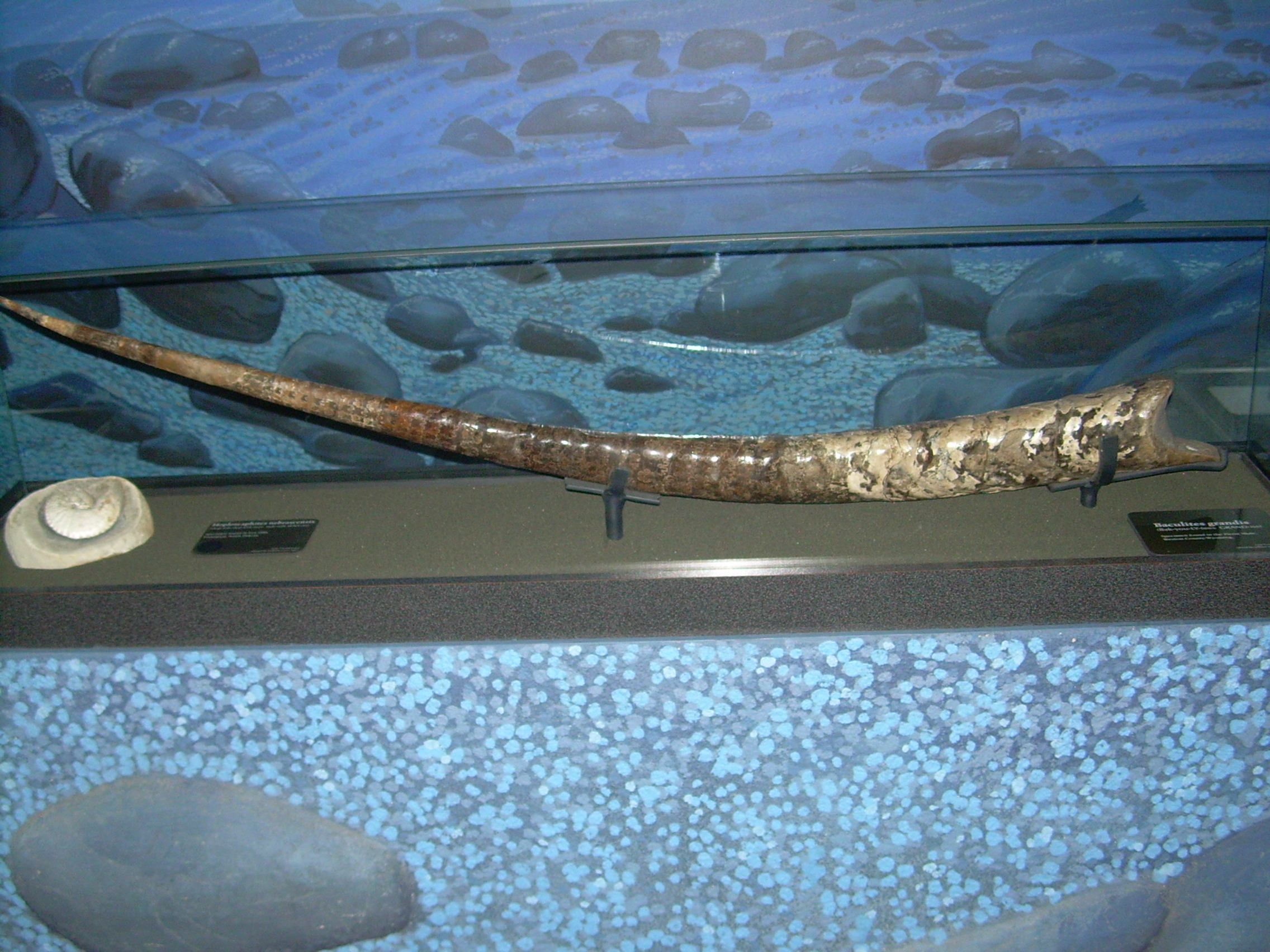
- Fossilized shell of the Late Cretaceous ammonoid cephalopod Baculites
  †Baculites
  - †Baculites arculus
  - †Baculites asper – or unidentified comparable form
  - †Baculites capensis
  - †Baculites tippahensis
- †Bananogmius
  - †Bananogmius crieleyi – type locality for species
  - †Bananogmius zitteli – or unidentified comparable form
- †Banis
- Barbatia
- †Belemnitella
  - †Belemnitella americana
- †Belemnitida
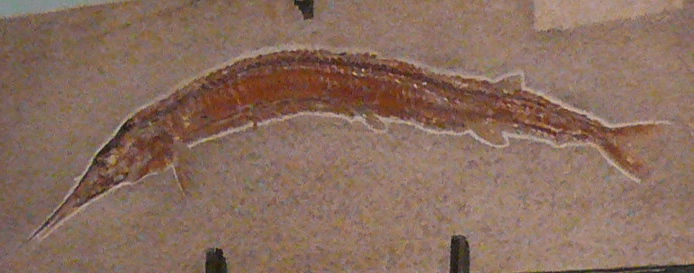
- Fossilized skeleton of the Late Cretaceous bony fish Belonostomus
  †Belonostomus
- Botula
  - †Botula carolinensis
  - †Botula conchafodentis
  - †Botula ripleyana
- Brachidontes – tentative report
- †Bulla – tentative report
- Cadulus
- Caestocorbula
  - †Caestocorbula crassaplica
  - †Caestocorbula crassiplica
  - †Caestocorbula percompressa
  - †Caestocorbula suffalciata
  - †Caestocorbula terramaria
- Callianassa
  - †Callianassa mortoni
- †Calliomphalus
  - †Calliomphalus americanus
  - †Calliomphalus nudus
- Calyptraea
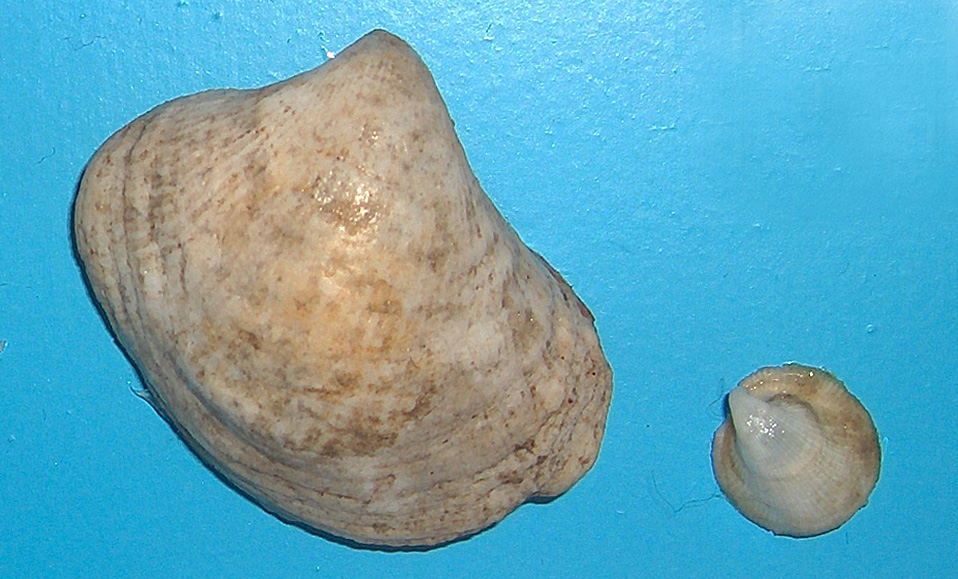
- Shells of modern Capulus cap sea snails
  Capulus
- †Caveola
- Cerithiella
  - †Cerithiella nodoliratum – or unidentified related form
  - †Cerithiella semirugatum
- Cerithiopsis
- Cerithium
- Charonia
- †Chelosphargis
  - †Chelosphargis advena – or unidentified comparable form
- Chlamys
- †Chondrites
- Cidaris
- †Cimolichthys
  - †Cimolichthys nepaholica
- Clavagella
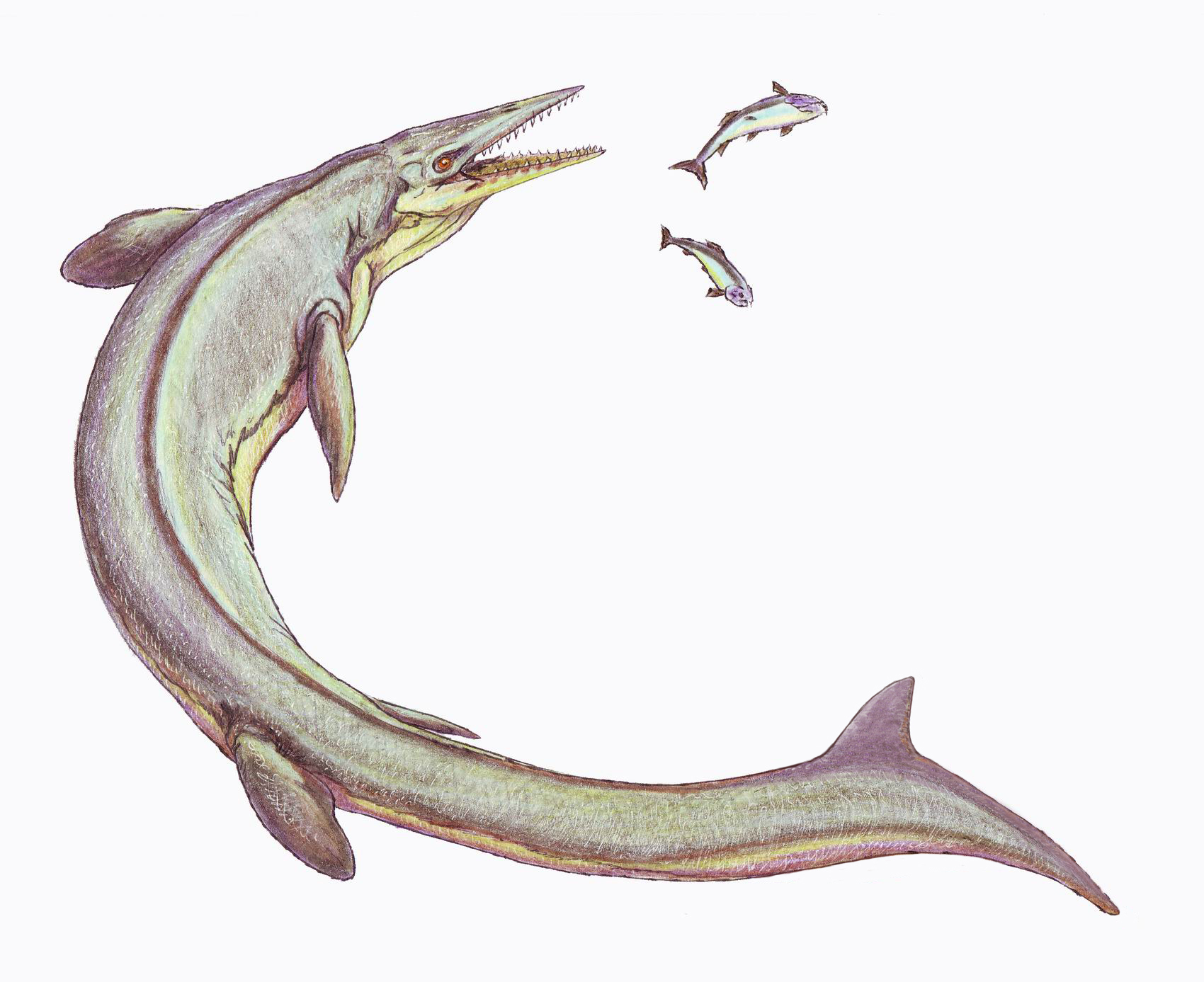
- Life restoration of the Late Cretaceous mosasaurid Clidastes
  †Clidastes
  - †Clidastes liodontus
  - †Clidastes propython – type locality for species
- Cliona
- Corbula
- †Corsochelys – type locality for genus
- Crassostrea
- †Crenella
  - †Crenella elegantula
  - †Crenella senica
  - †Crenella serica
- †Cretolamna
  - †Cretolamna appendiculata
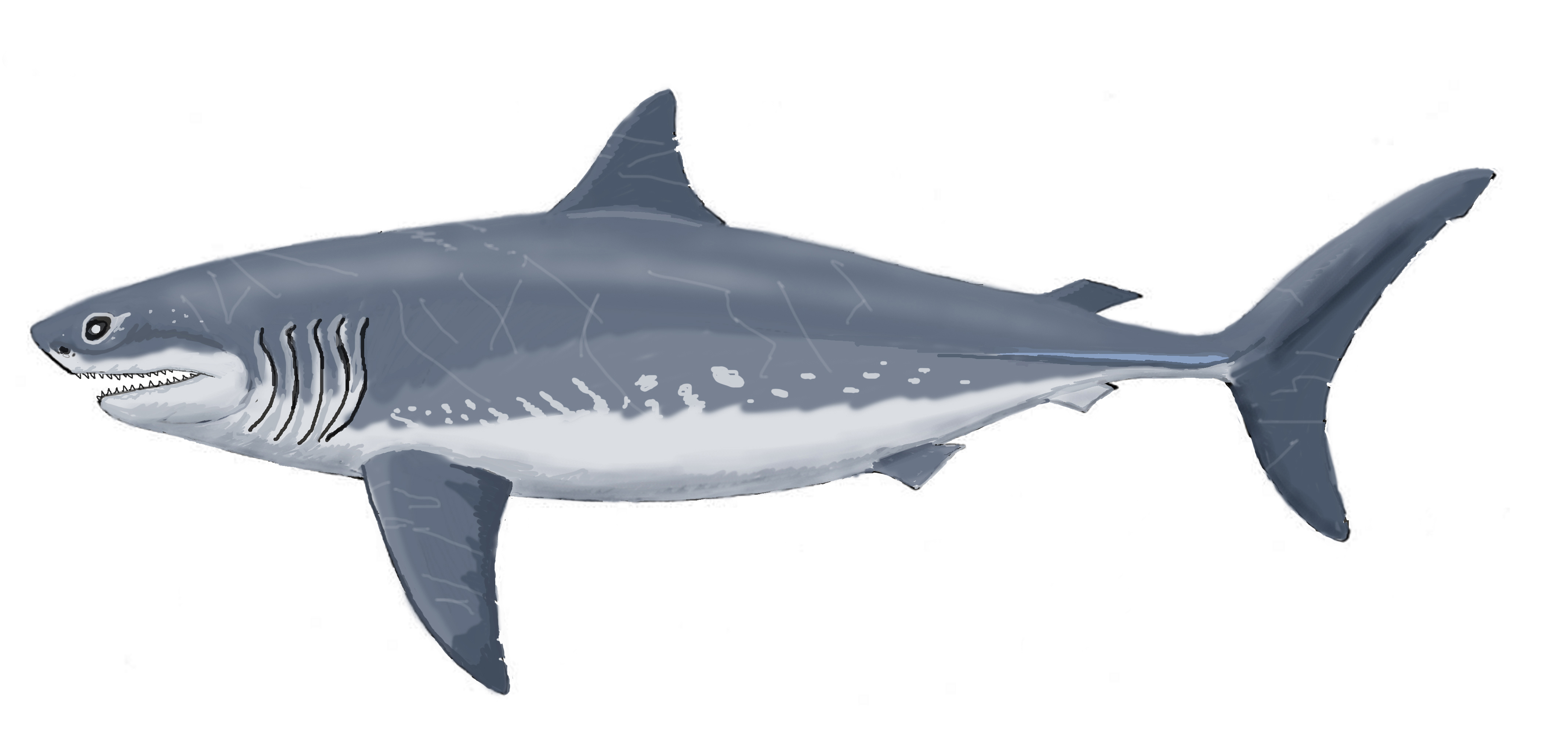
- Restoration of the Late Cretaceous shark Cretoxyrhina, or the Ginsu shark
  †Cretoxyrhina
  - †Cretoxyrhina mantelli
- Crucibulum
- Ctenochelys – type locality for genus
  - †Ctenochelys acris – type locality for species
  - †Ctenochelys tenuitesta – type locality for species
- Cucullaea
  - †Cucullaea capax
  - †Cucullaea littlei
  - †Cucullaea powersi – or unidentified comparable form
- Cuspidaria
  - †Cuspidaria ampulla
  - †Cuspidaria grandis
  - †Cuspidaria grovensis
  - †Cuspidaria jerseyensis – or unidentified comparable form
- Cylichna
  - †Cylichna diversilirata
  - †Cylichna incisa
- †Cymella
- Cypraea – report made of unidentified related form or using admittedly obsolete nomenclature
- Dasmosmilia
  - †Dasmosmilia kochii
  - †Dasmosmilia reesidi
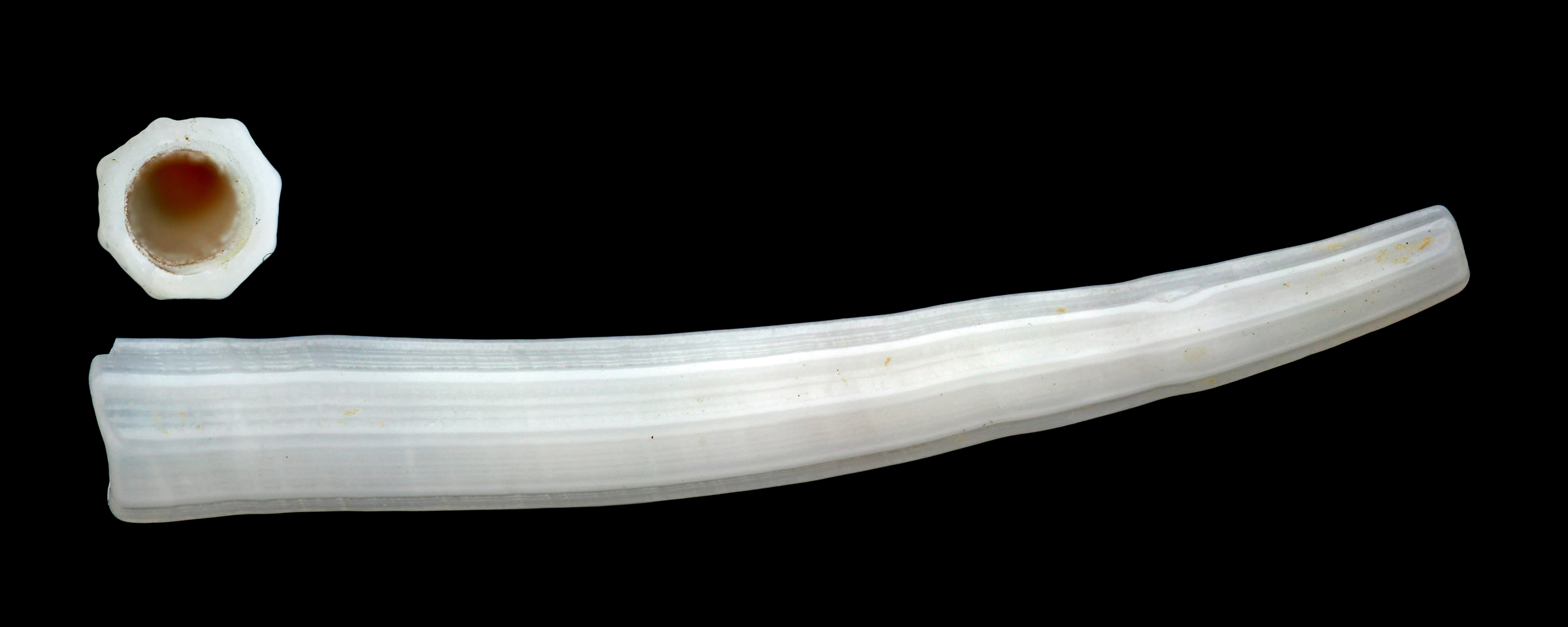
- Shell of a Dentalium tusk shell
  †Dentalium
  - †Dentalium leve
  - †Dentalium pauperculum
  - †Dentalium ripleyana
- †Discosaurus
  - †Discosaurus vetustus
- †Discoscaphites
  - †Discoscaphites conradi
  - †Discoscaphites iris
- †Dolicholatirus
- †Ecphora
- Edaphodon
  - †Edaphodon barberi – type locality for species
  - †Edaphodon mirificus
- †Enchodus
  - †Enchodus petrosus
  - †Enchodus saevus – or unidentified comparable form
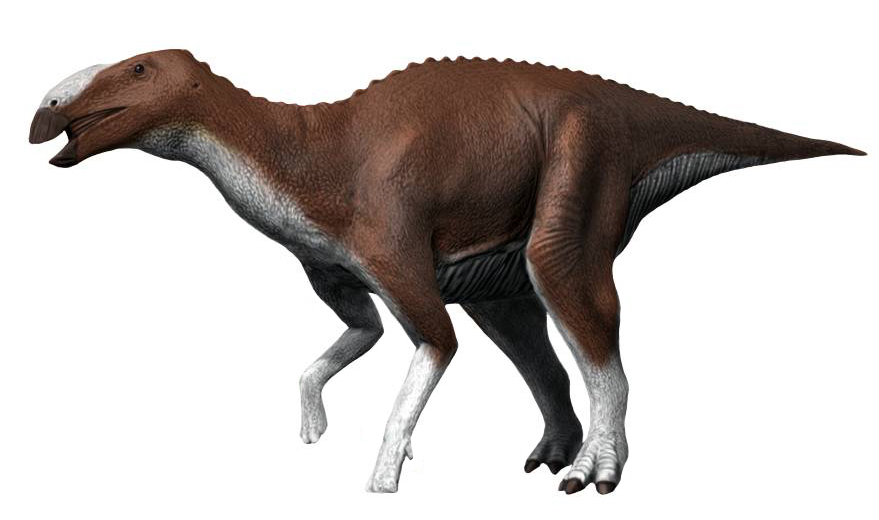
- Restoration of the Late Cretaceous duck-billed dinosaur Eotrachodon
  †Eotrachodon – type locality for genus
  - †Eotrachodon orientalis – type locality for species
- †Epitonium
  - †Epitonium sillimani
- †Eulima
  - †Eulima gracilistylis
  - †Eulima monmouthensis
- †Euspira
- †Eutrephoceras
- †Exogyra
  - †Exogyra costata
  - †Exogyra ponderosa
  - †Exogyra upatoiensis
- Fusinus
- †Gegania
- Gemmula
- †Gervillia
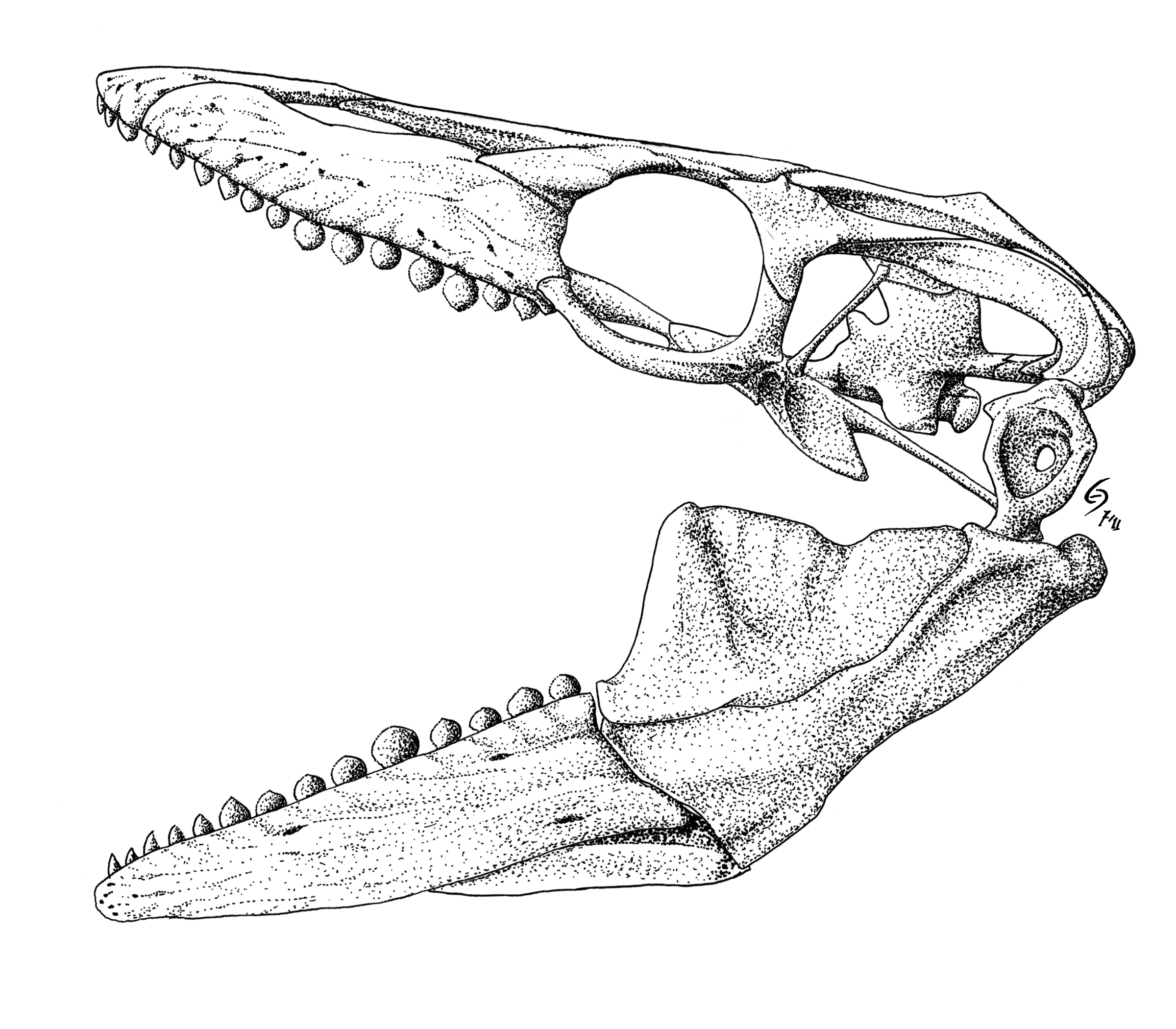
- Illustration of a reconstructed skull of the Late Cretaceous mosasaur Globidens
  †Globidens – type locality for genus
  - †Globidens alabamensis – type locality for species
- Glossus
- Glycymeris
  - †Glycymeris hamula
  - †Glycymeris rotundata
  - †Glycymeris subaustralis
- †Halimornis – type locality for genus
  - †Halimornis thompsoni – type locality for species
- †Halisaurus
  - †Halisaurus sternbergi
- †Hamulus
- Haustator
- †Helicoceras
- Hoplopteryx – tentative report
- †Hybodus
- †Ichthyodectes
  - †Ichthyodectes ctenodon – or unidentified comparable form
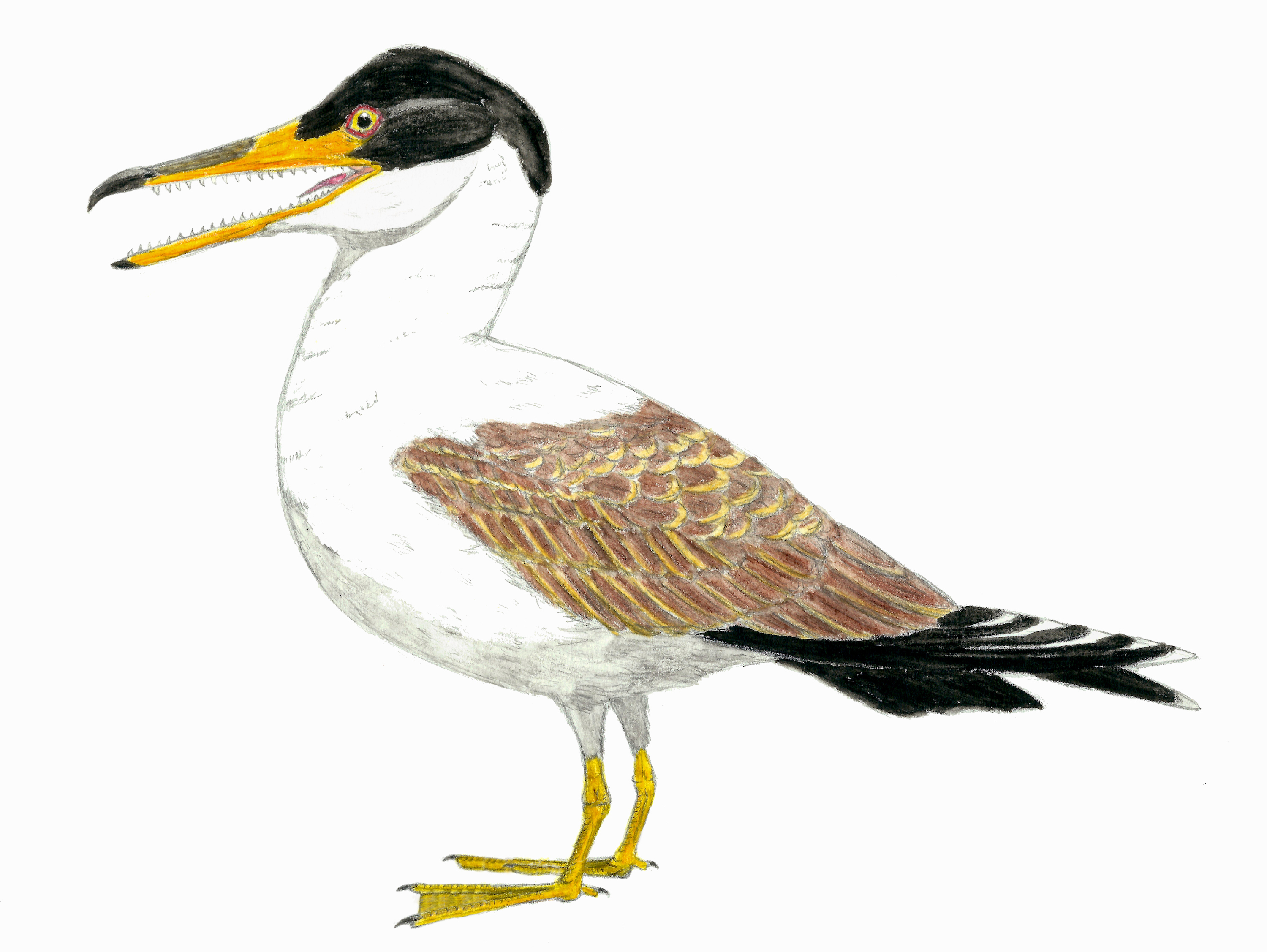
- Restoration of the Late Cretaceous toothed bird Ichthyornis
  †Ichthyornis – type locality for genus
  - †Ichthyornis dispar – type locality for species
- †Inoceramus
- †Ischyrhiza
  - †Ischyrhiza mira
- Isognomon
- Lima
- Limatula
- †Linearis
- †Linter
- †Linthia
- Lithophaga
- Lopha
  - †Lopha falcata
  - †Lopha mesenterica
  - †Lopha ucheensis
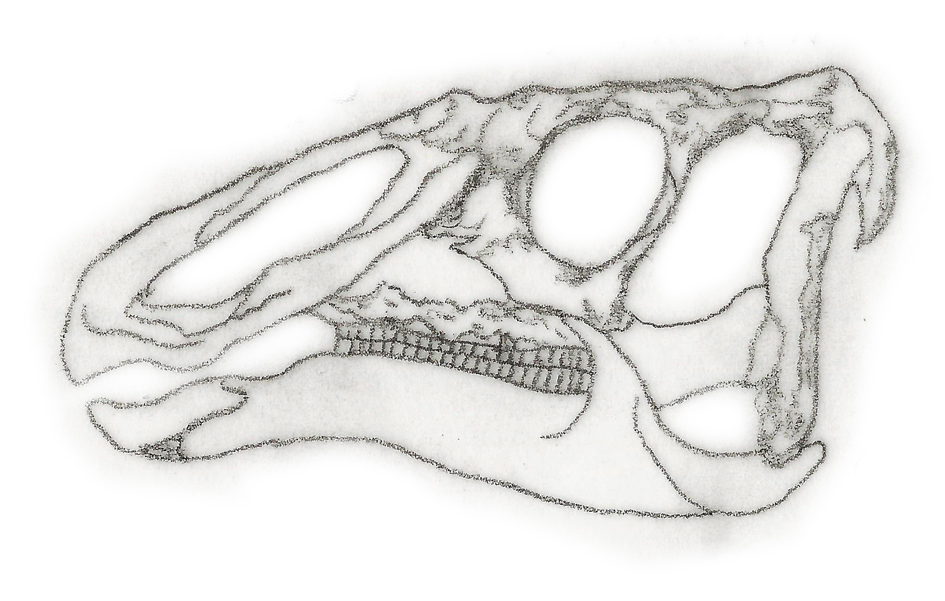
- Illustration of a fossilized skull of the Late Cretaceous duck-billed dinosaur Lophorhothon
  †Lophorhothon – type locality for genus
  - †Lophorhothon atopus – type locality for species
- †Loxotoma
- †Lucina
- Martesia
- †Mathilda
- †Megalocoelacanthus – type locality for genus
  - †Megalocoelacanthus dobiei – type locality for species
- Menippe
- †Modiolus
  - †Modiolus sedesclaris
  - †Modiolus sedesclarus
  - †Modiolus trigonus
- †Moorevillia – type locality for genus
- †Morea
- †Neithea
  - †Neithea bexarensis
  - †Neithea quinquecostata
  - †Neithea quinquecostatus
- Nozeba
- Nucula
  - †Nucula camia
  - †Nucula cuneifrons
  - †Nucula percrassa
  - †Nucula severnensis
- Odontaspis
- Ostrea
- †Pachydiscus
- †Pachymelania – tentative report
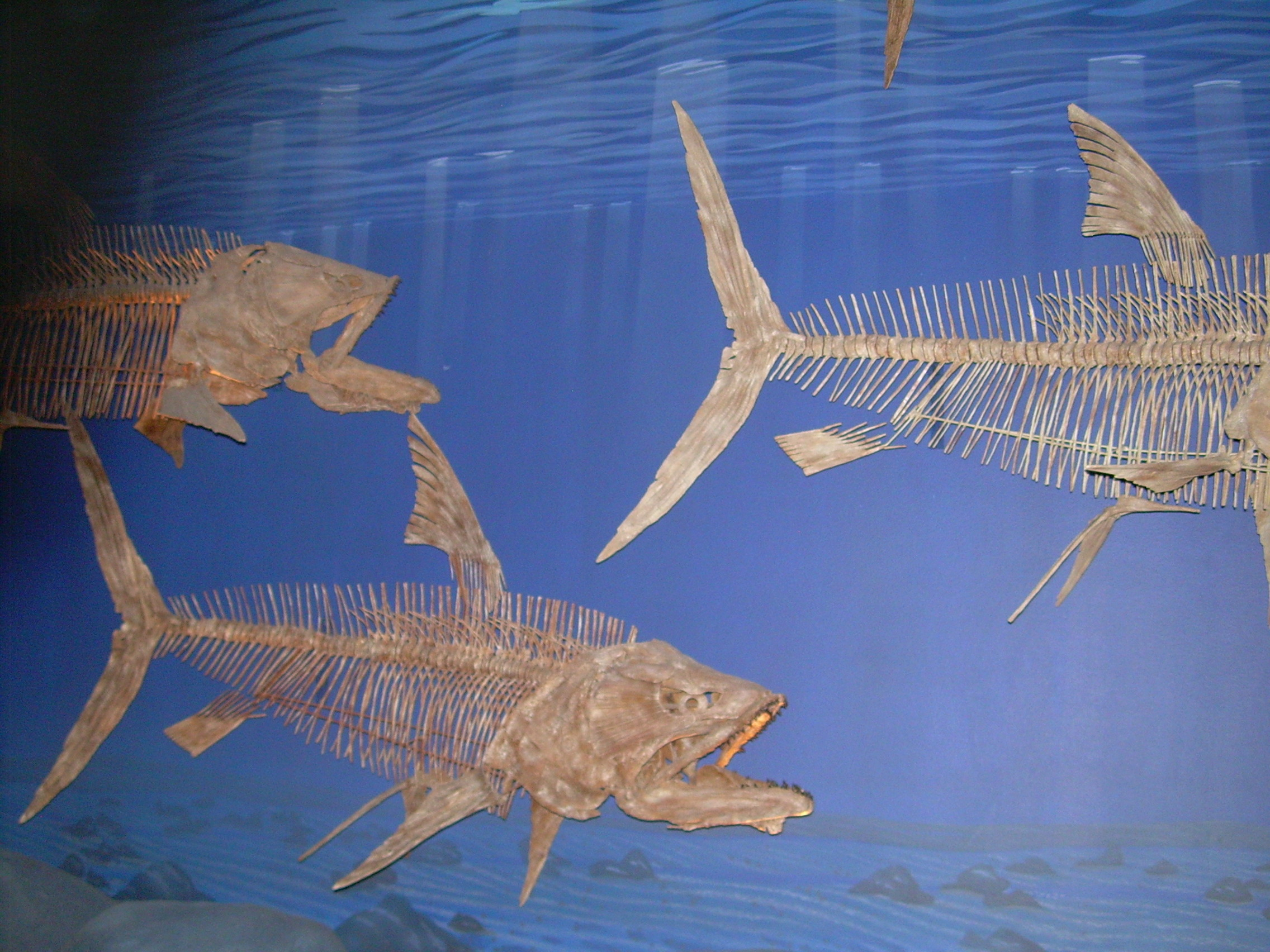
- Fossilized skeletons of the Late Cretaceous bony fish Pachyrhizodus
  †Pachyrhizodus
  - †Pachyrhizodus caninus
  - †Pachyrhizodus kingi
  - †Pachyrhizodus minimus
- Pagurus
  - †Pagurus convexus – type locality for species
- Panopea
- †Paranomia
- †Pecten
- Pholadomya
  - †Pholadomya occidentalis
  - †Pholadomya tippana
- †Pinna
- †Placenticeras
  - †Placenticeras benningi
- †Plagiostoma
- †Platecarpus
- Plicatula
- Polinices
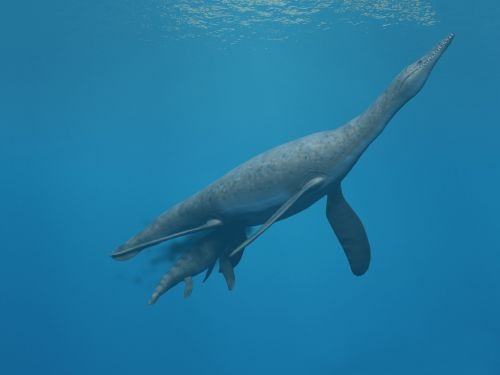
- Life restoration of the Late Cretaceous polycotylid plesiosaur Polycotylus giving birth
  †Polycotylus
  - †Polycotylus latipinnis
- †Prognathodon
- †Protocardia
- †Protosphyraena
  - †Protosphyraena nitida – tentative report
- †Protostega
  - †Protostega dixie – type locality for species
  - †Protostega gigas
- †Pseudocorax
  - †Pseudocorax affinis
  - †Pseudocorax laevis
- †Pteria
- †Pterotrigonia
  - †Pterotrigonia angulicostata
  - †Pterotrigonia cerulea
  - †Pterotrigonia eufalensis
  - †Pterotrigonia eufaulensis
  - †Pterotrigonia thoracica
- †Ptychodus
  - †Ptychodus mortoni
  - †Ptychodus polygyrus
- †Ptychotrygon
- Pycnodonte
  - †Pycnodonte belli
  - †Pycnodonte mutabilis
  - †Pycnodonte vesicularis
  - †Pycnodonte wratheri
- Ringicula
  - †Ringicula clarki
  - †Ringicula pulchella
- Rissoina
- Rostellaria – tentative report
- †Sargana
- †Saurocephalus
  - †Saurocephalus lanciformis – or unidentified comparable form
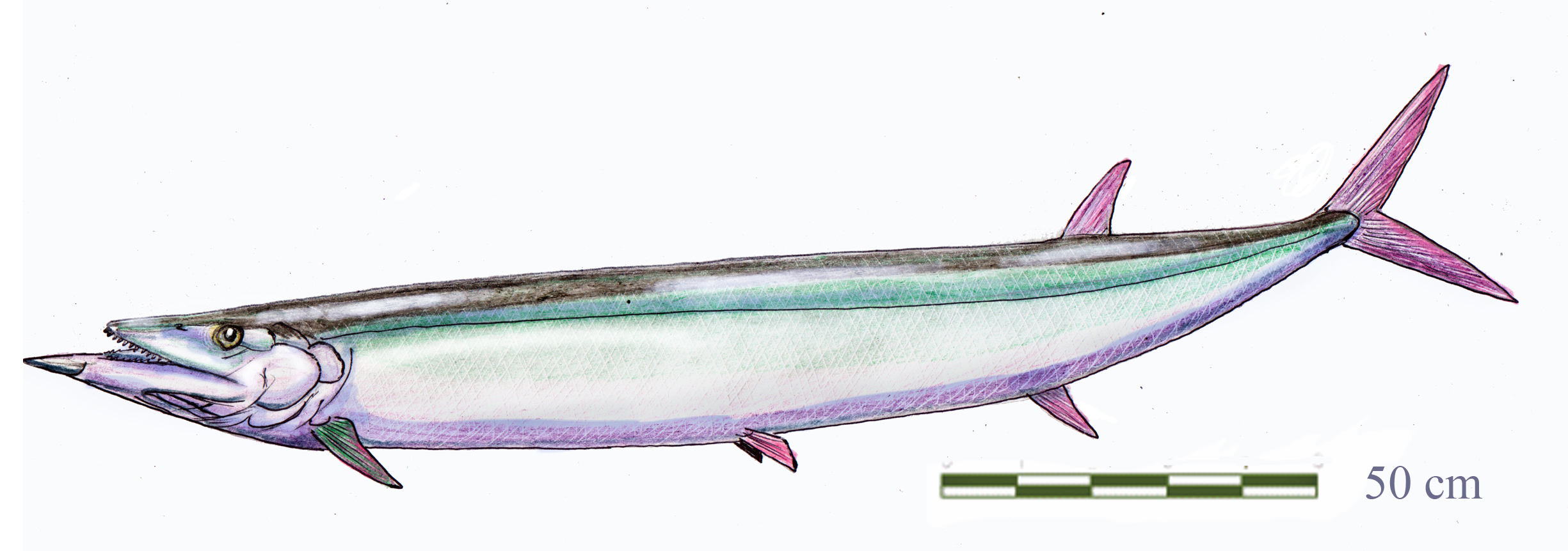
- Restoration of the Late Cretaceous bony fish Saurodon
  †Saurodon
  - †Saurodon leanus
- †Saurornitholestes – or unidentified comparable form
- †Scapanorhynchus
  - †Scapanorhynchus rapax
  - †Scapanorhynchus rhaphiodon
- †Scaphites
- †Schizobasis
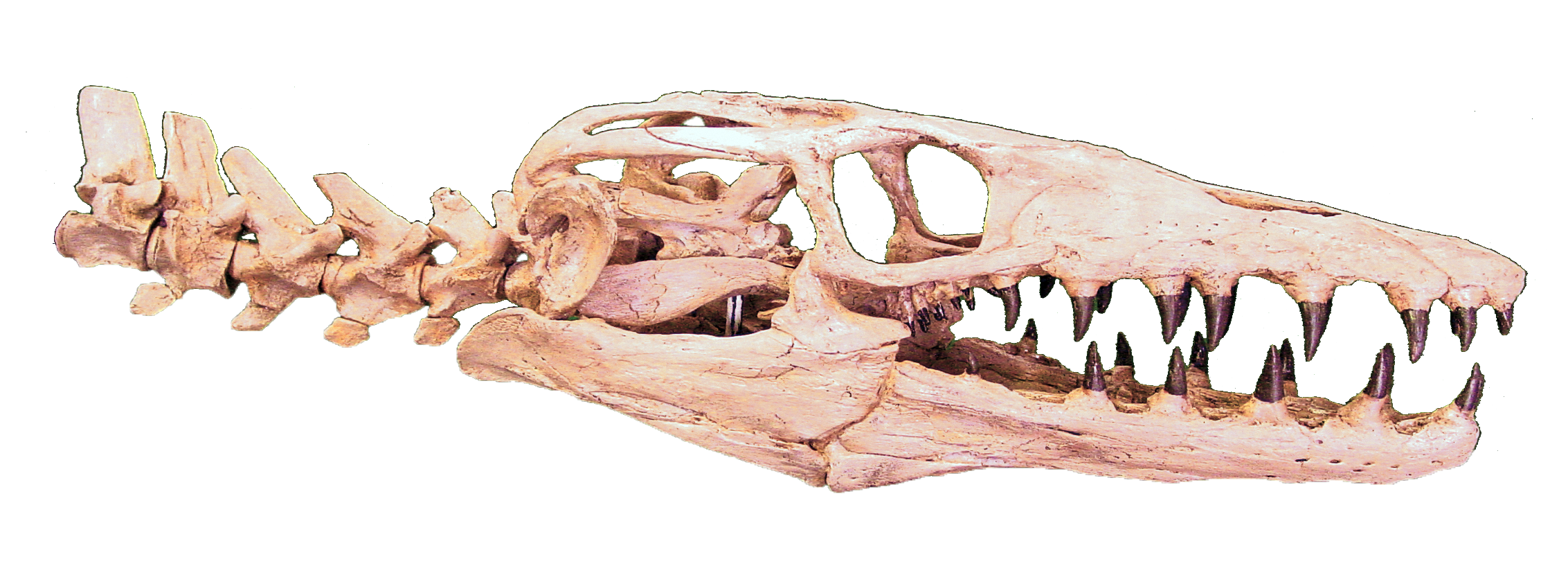
- Mounted fossilized skull and neck of the Late Cretaceous mosasaur Selmasaurus
  †Selmasaurus – type locality for genus
  - †Selmasaurus russelli – type locality for species
- Serpula
- Solemya
- †Sphenodiscus
  - †Sphenodiscus lobatus
  - †Sphenodiscus pleurisepta
- †Spirorbula
- Spondylus
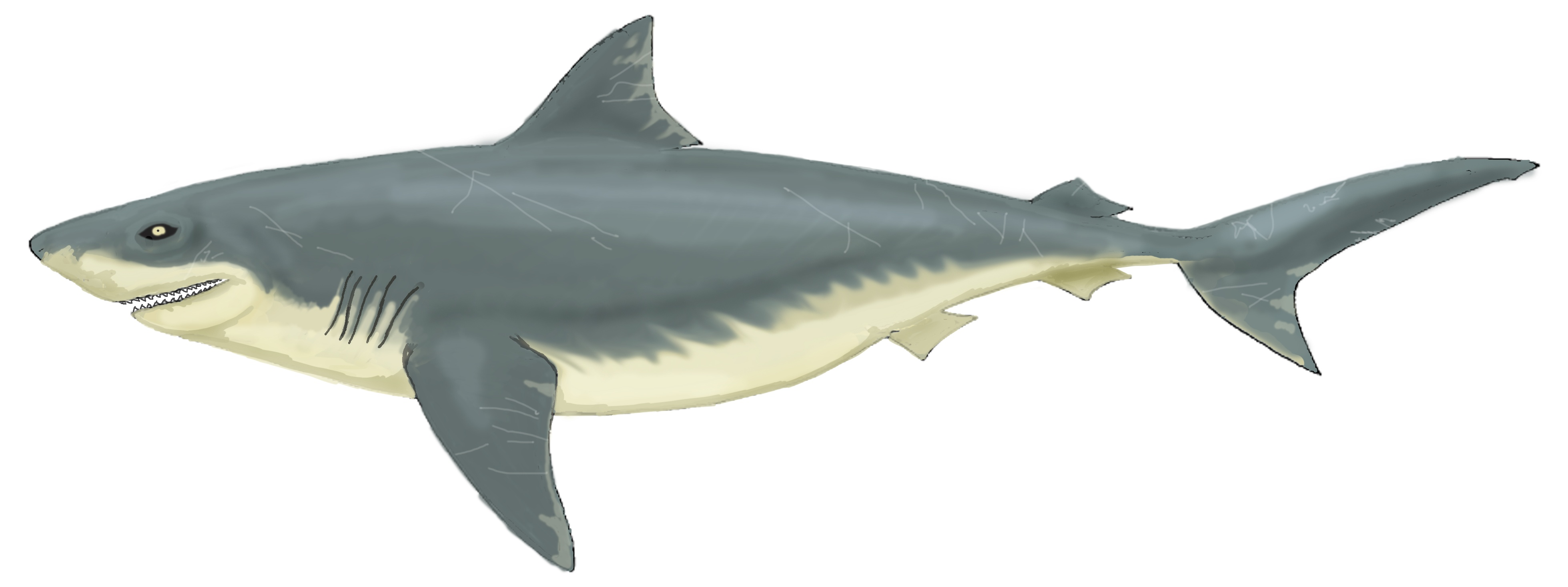
- Restoration of the Late Cretaceous shark Squalicorax
  Squalicorax
  - †Squalicorax falcatus
  - †Squalicorax pristodontus
- †Stratodus
- Teinostoma
- Tellina
- †Tenea
- Teredo
- †Thalassinoides
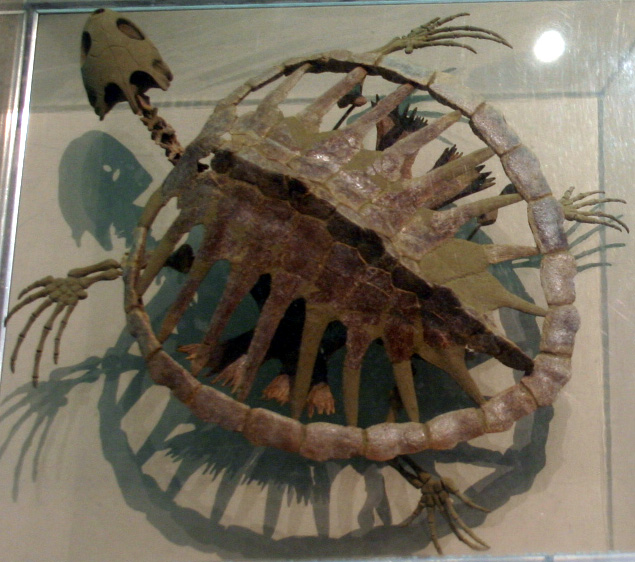
- Mounted fossilized skeleton of the Late Cretaceous sea turtle Toxochelys
  †Toxochelys
- Trachycardium
  - †Trachycardium efaulense
  - †Trachycardium eufaulense
  - †Trachycardium eufaulensis
- Turritella
  - †Turritella bilira
  - †Turritella chalybeatensis
  - †Turritella forgemoli – or unidentified comparable form
  - †Turritella hilgardi
  - †Turritella paravertebroides
  - †Turritella tippana
  - †Turritella trilira
  - †Turritella vertebroides
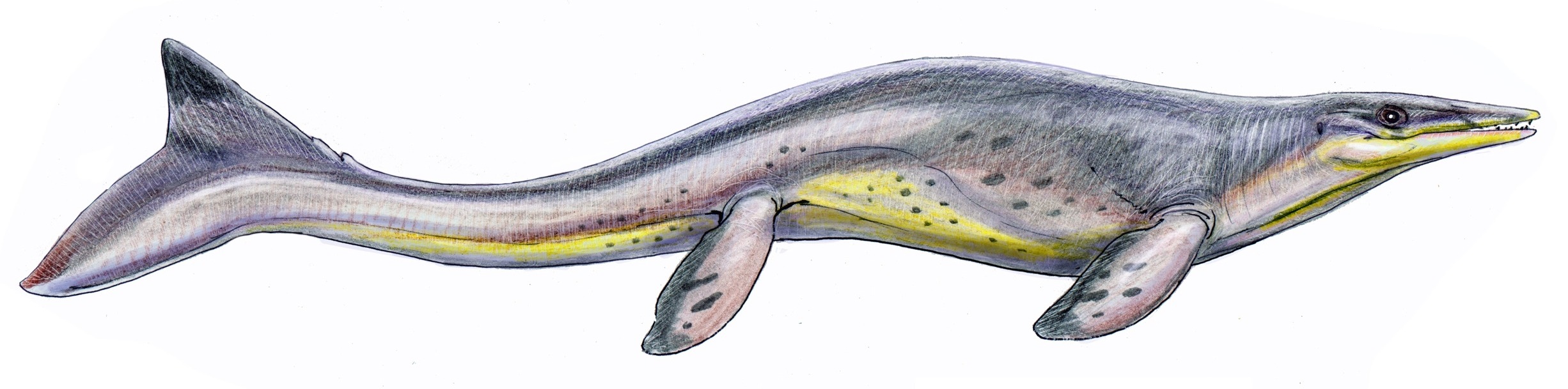
- Restoration of the Late Cretaceous mosasaur Tylosaurus
  †Tylosaurus
  - †Tylosaurus zangerli
- Xenophora
- †Xiphactinus
  - †Xiphactinus audax

== Cenozoic ==
=== Selected Cenozoic taxa of Alabama ===
- Abra
- Acanthocardia
- Accipiter
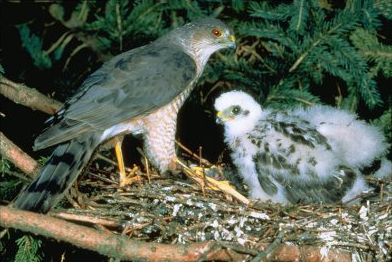
  - Living adult (center) and chick (lower right) Accipiter striatus, or sharp-shinned hawks
    †Accipiter striatus
- Acirsa
- Aclis – report made of unidentified related form or using admittedly obsolete nomenclature
- Acropora
- Acteocina
- Acteon
- †Adeorbis – report made of unidentified related form or using admittedly obsolete nomenclature
- Aequipecten
- Aetobatus
- Agaronia
- Alaba
- Albula
- †Allomorone – type locality for genus
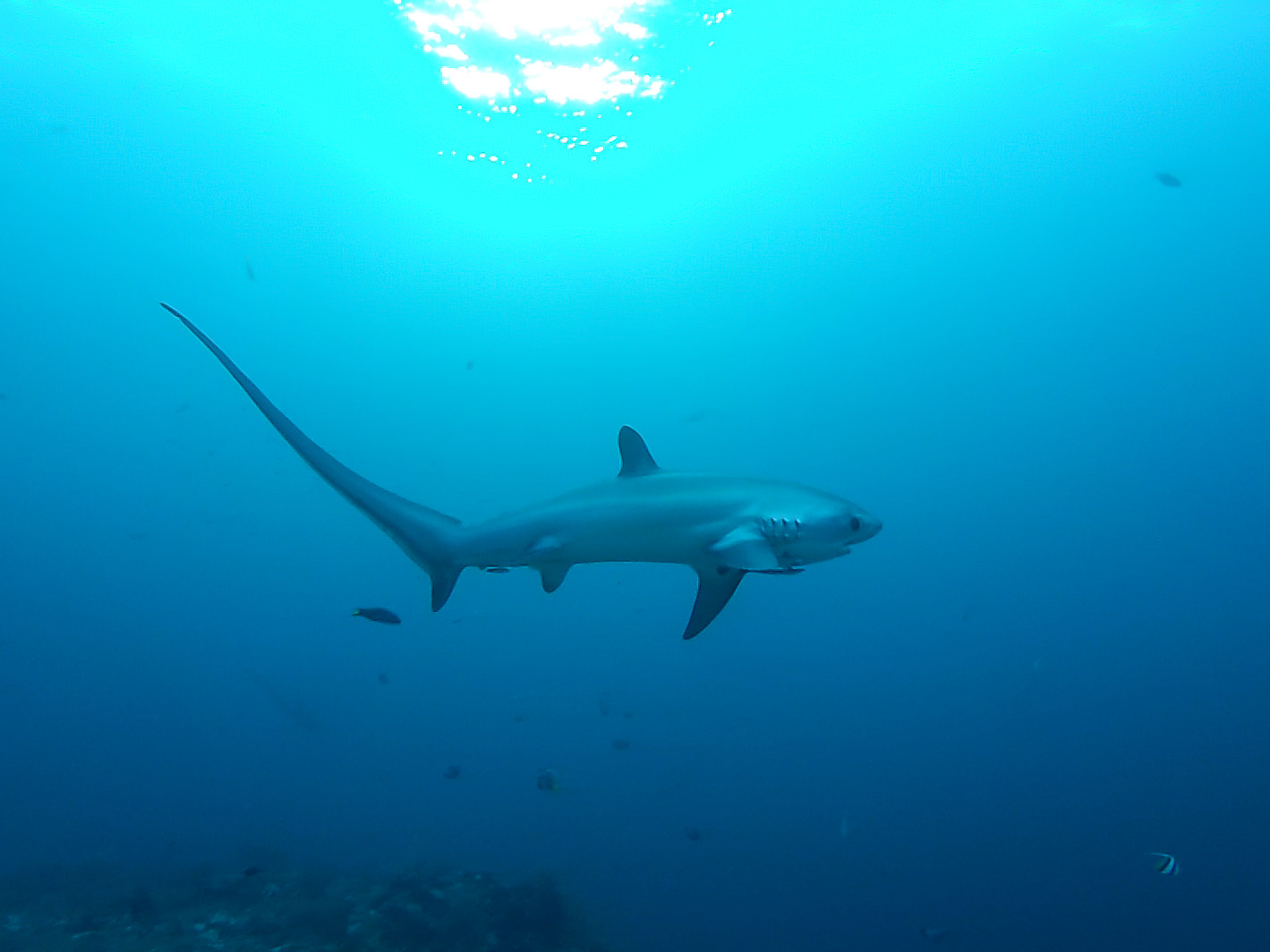
- A living Alopias, or thresher shark
  Alopias
- Amaura
- †Ambystoma
- Ampheristus
- †Ampullina
- Amusium
- Anas
  - †Anas crecca
  - †Anas platyrhynchos
- Ancilla
- Angaria – report made of unidentified related form or using admittedly obsolete nomenclature
- Angulus
- Anodontia
- Anolis
  - †Anolis carolinensis
- Anomia
- Antalis
- Apalone
  - †Apalone spinifera
- †Aphelops
- Aplodinotus – tentative report
- Aporrhais
- Arca
- Architectonica
- †Arctodus
  - †Arctodus simus
- †Area
- Argobuccinum
- Argyrotheca
- Astarte
- Asthenotoma
- Astrangia
- Astyris
- Athleta
- Atrina
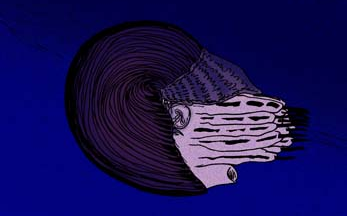
- Restoration of the Paleocene-Miocene nautiloid cephalopod Aturia
  †Aturia
- Atys
- Aythya
  - †Aythya collaris
  - †Aythya valisineria – or unidentified comparable form
- Bactridium
- †Baculites
- Balanophyllia
- Balanus
- †Baluchicardia
- Barbatia
- Barnea
- Bartramia
  - †Bartramia longicauda
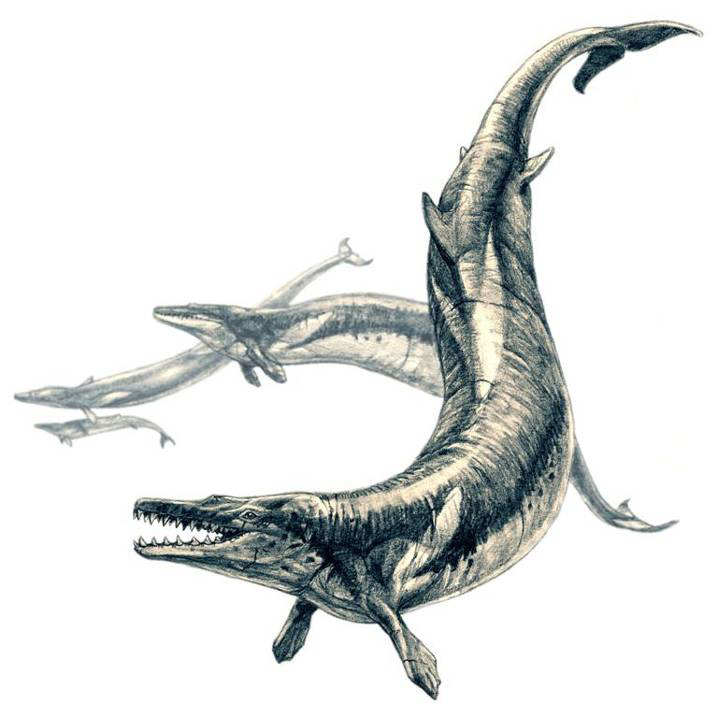
- Life restoration of a pod of the Eocene whale Basilosaurus
  †Basilosaurus
  - †Basilosaurus cetoides
- Bathytoma
  - †Bathytoma nonplicata – or unidentified comparable form
- †Belosaepia
- Bison
  - †Bison antiquus
- Bittium
- Blarina
  - †Blarina carolinensis
- Bonasa
  - †Bonasa umbellus
- †Bonellitia
- Botula
  - †Botula carolinensis
- Brachidontes
- Branta
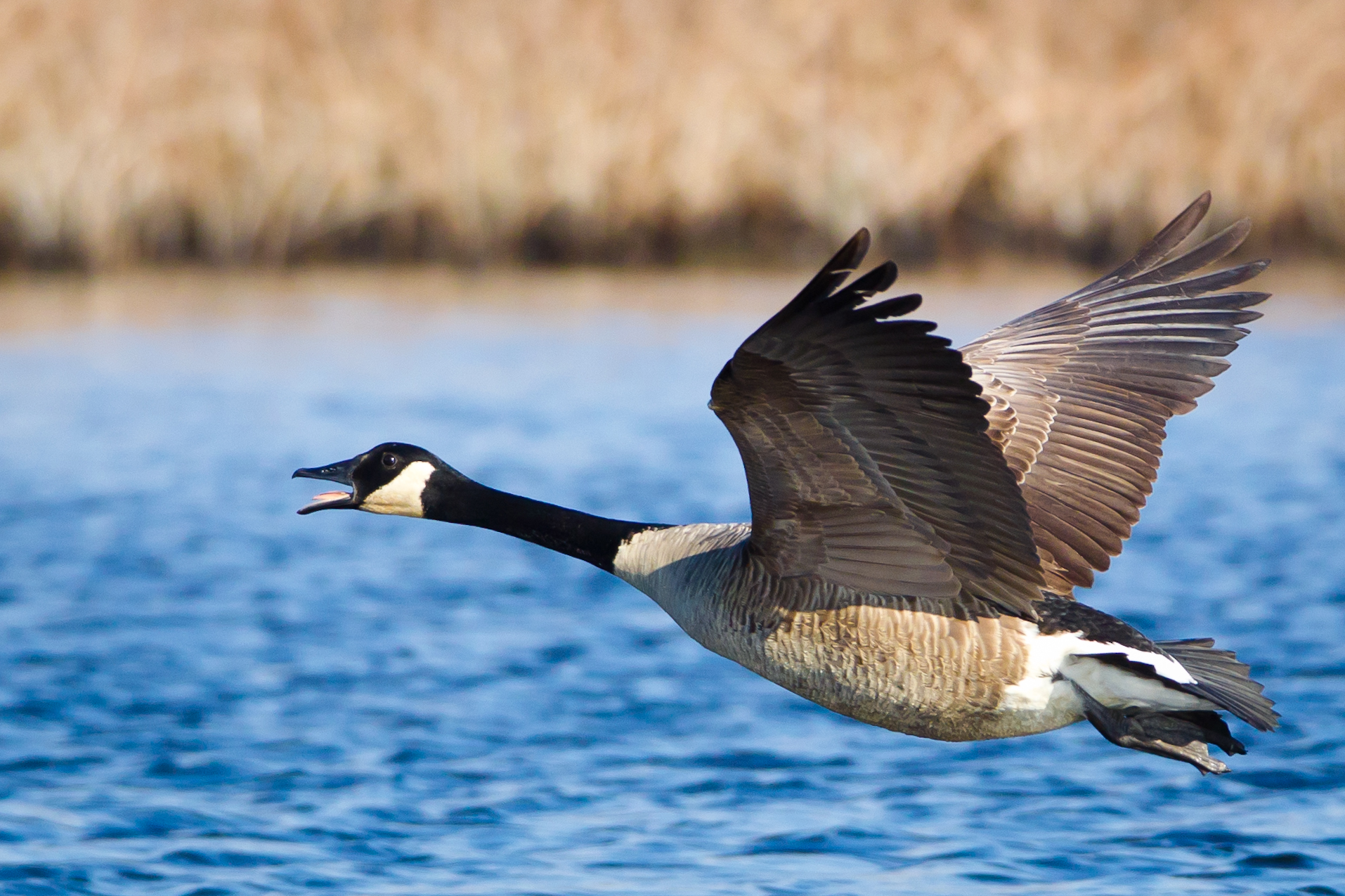
  - A living Branta canadensis, or Canada goose
    †Branta canadensis
- Bufo
  - †Bufo americanus
  - †Bufo woodhousei
- Bullia
- †Burnhamia
- Busycon
- Cadulus
- Caestocorbula
- Callianassa
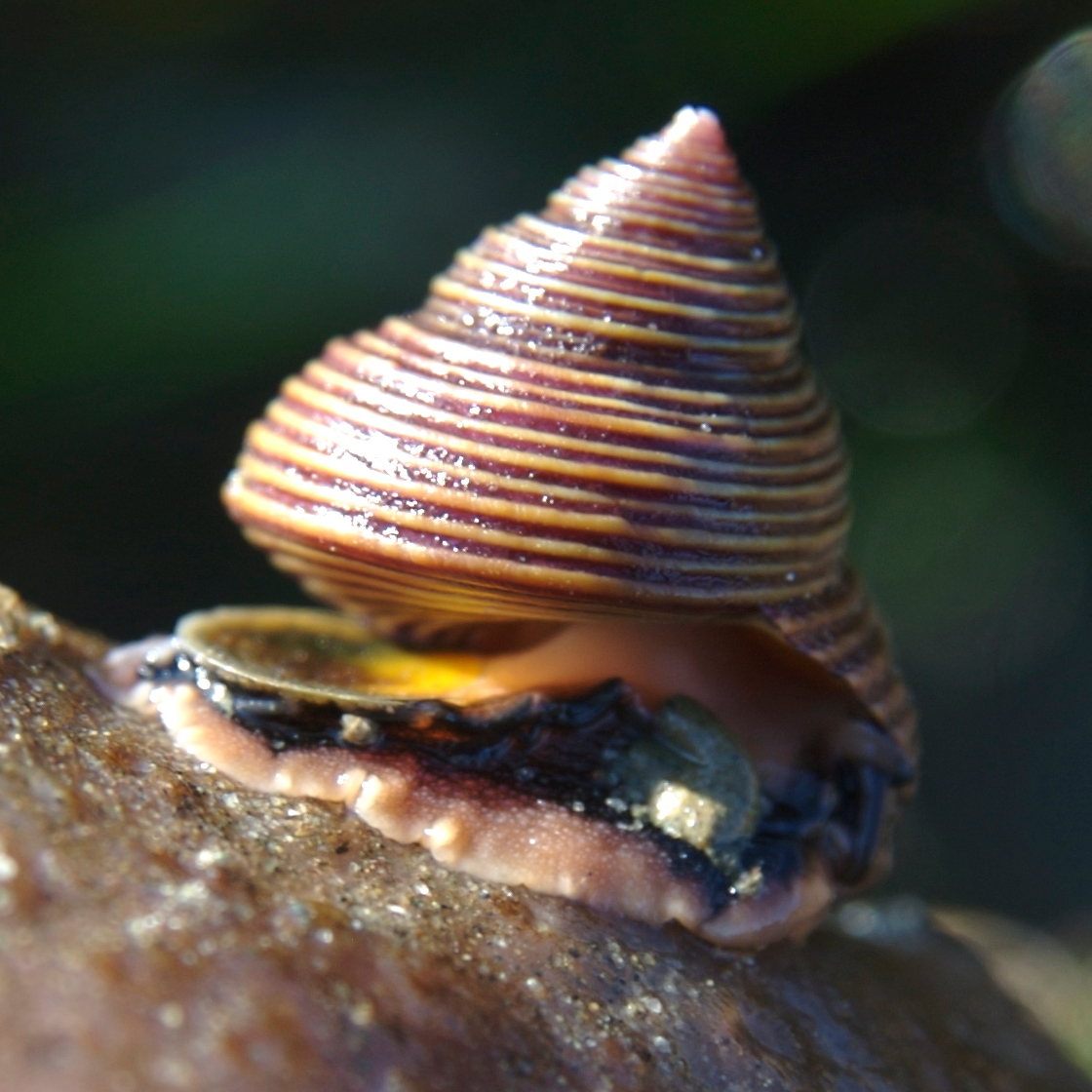
- A living Calliostoma top sea snail
  Calliostoma
- Callista
- Calyptraea
- Campanile
- Cancellaria
  - †Cancellaria costata
- Canis
  - †Canis rufus
- Cantharus
- Capulus
- Carcharhinus
- Carcharias
- Carphophis
- Caryophyllia
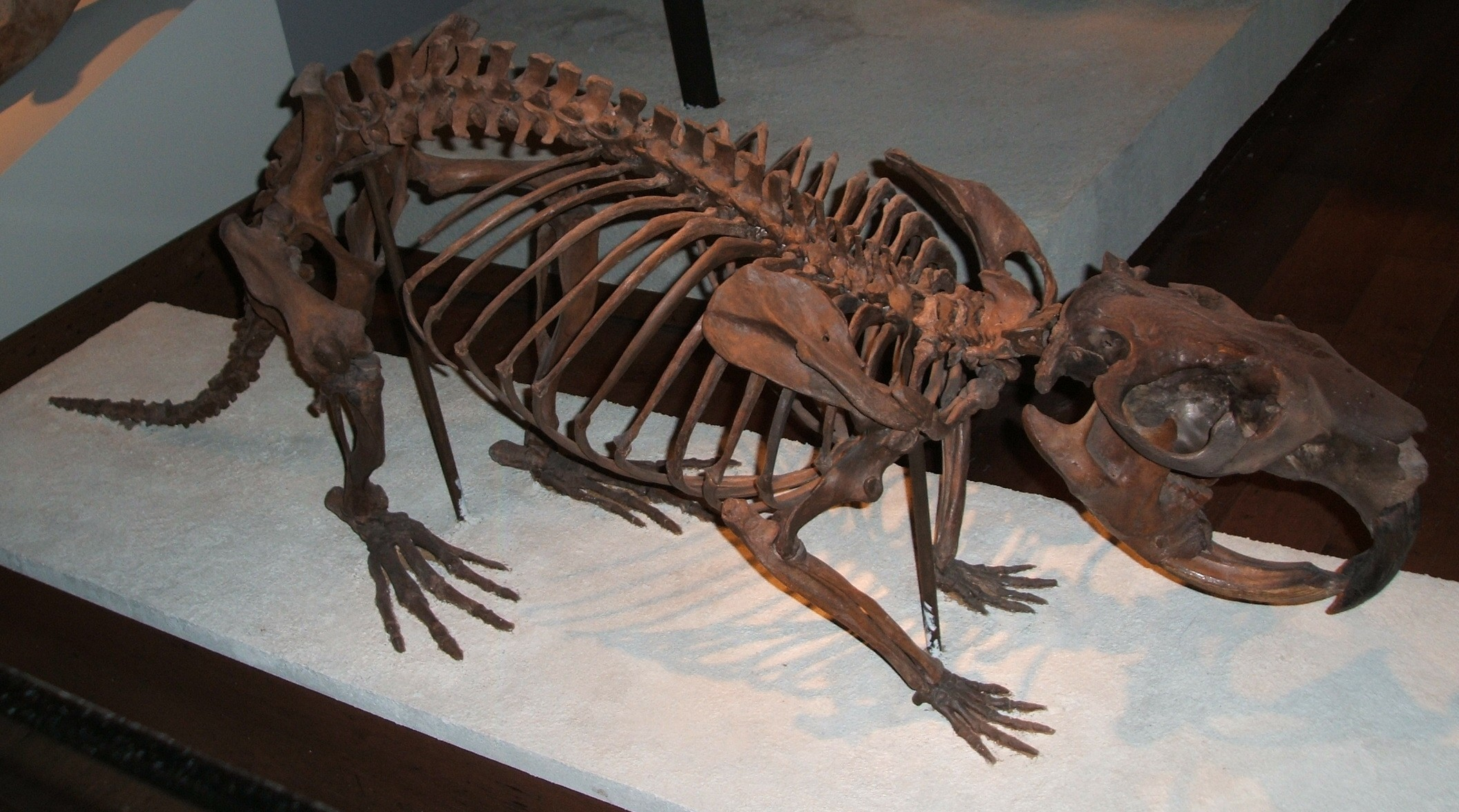
- Mounted fossilized skeleton of the Pliocene-Pleistocene giant beaver Castoroides
  †Castoroides
- †Catenicella
- Catoptrophorus
  - †Catoptrophorus semipalmatus
- Centroberyx
- Cerithiella
- Cerithiopsis
- Cerithium – report made of unidentified related form or using admittedly obsolete nomenclature
- Cervus
  - †Cervus elaphus
- Chama
- Charonia
- Chiton
- Chlamys
- †Chlorophthalmus – report made of unidentified related form or using admittedly obsolete nomenclature
- Chrysemys
  - †Chrysemys picta
- †Chrysodomus – report made of unidentified related form or using admittedly obsolete nomenclature
- Cibicides
- Cidaris
- Cirsotrema
- Clavatula – report made of unidentified related form or using admittedly obsolete nomenclature
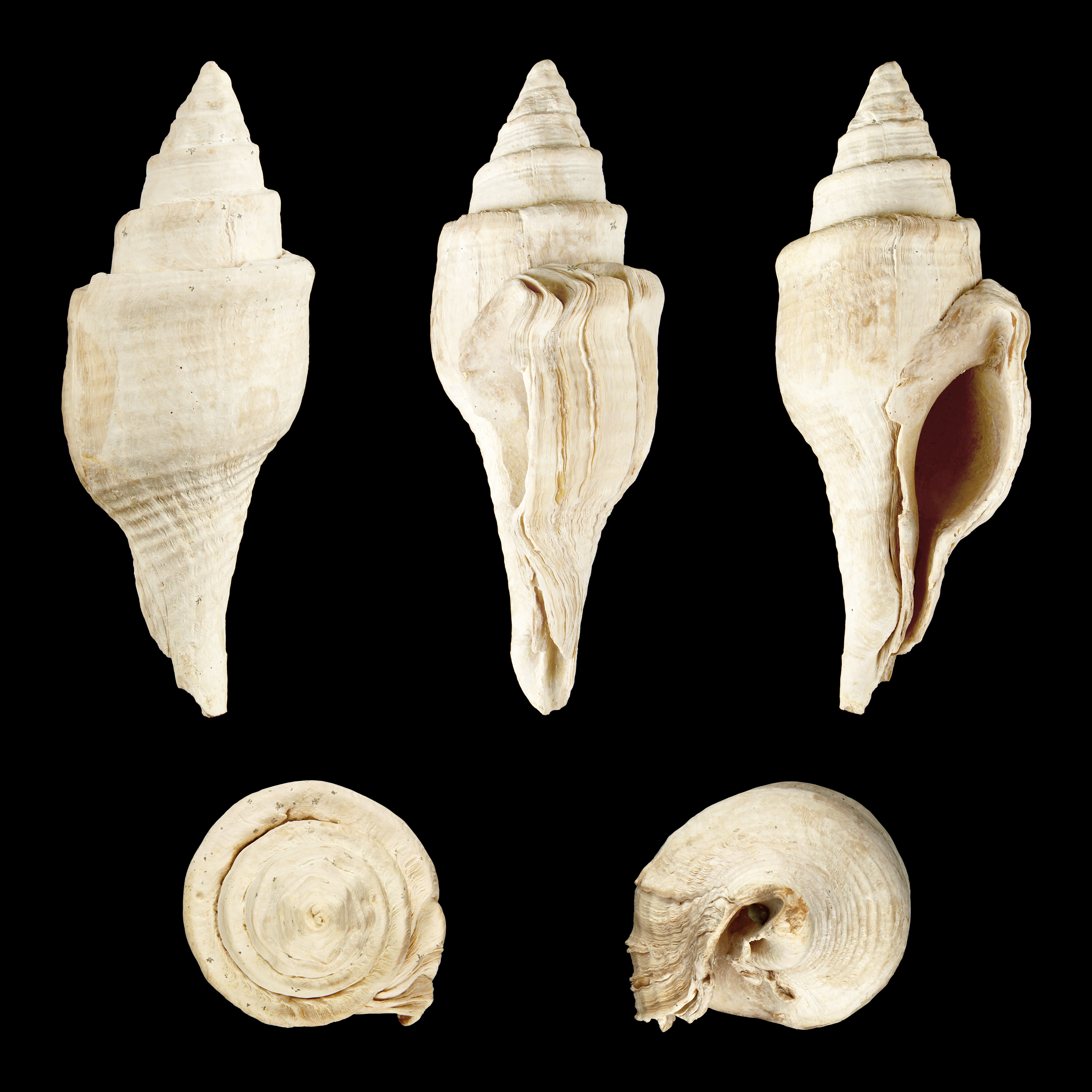
- Multiple views of a fossilized shell of the Paleocene-Pliocene spindle sea snail Clavilithes
  Clavilithes
- Cliona
- Closia
- Clypeaster
- Cochlespira
- Codakia – tentative report
- Colinus
  - †Colinus virginianus
- Coluber
  - †Coluber constrictor
- Columbellopsis
- Conomitra
- †Conorbis
- Conus
- Corbicula – tentative report
- Corbula
- Cordieria
- †Cormohipparion
- †Corvina
- Corvus
  - †Corvus corax
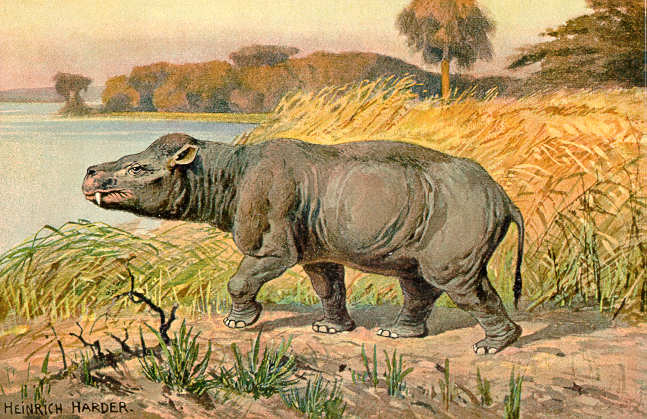
- Life restoration of the Paleocene-Eocene pantodont mammal Coryphodon. Heinrich Harder (1920).
  †Coryphodon
- Crassostrea
  - †Crassostrea alabamiensis
- Crenella
- Crepidula
- Crisia
- †Crommium
- Crotalus
  - †Crotalus horridus
- Cryptobranchus
  - †Cryptobranchus alleganiensis
- Cucullaea
- Cultellus
- Cuna
- Cuspidaria
- Cyanocitta
  - †Cyanocitta cristata
- Cygnus
- Cylichna
- †Cylindracanthus
- Cyllene – or unidentified comparable form
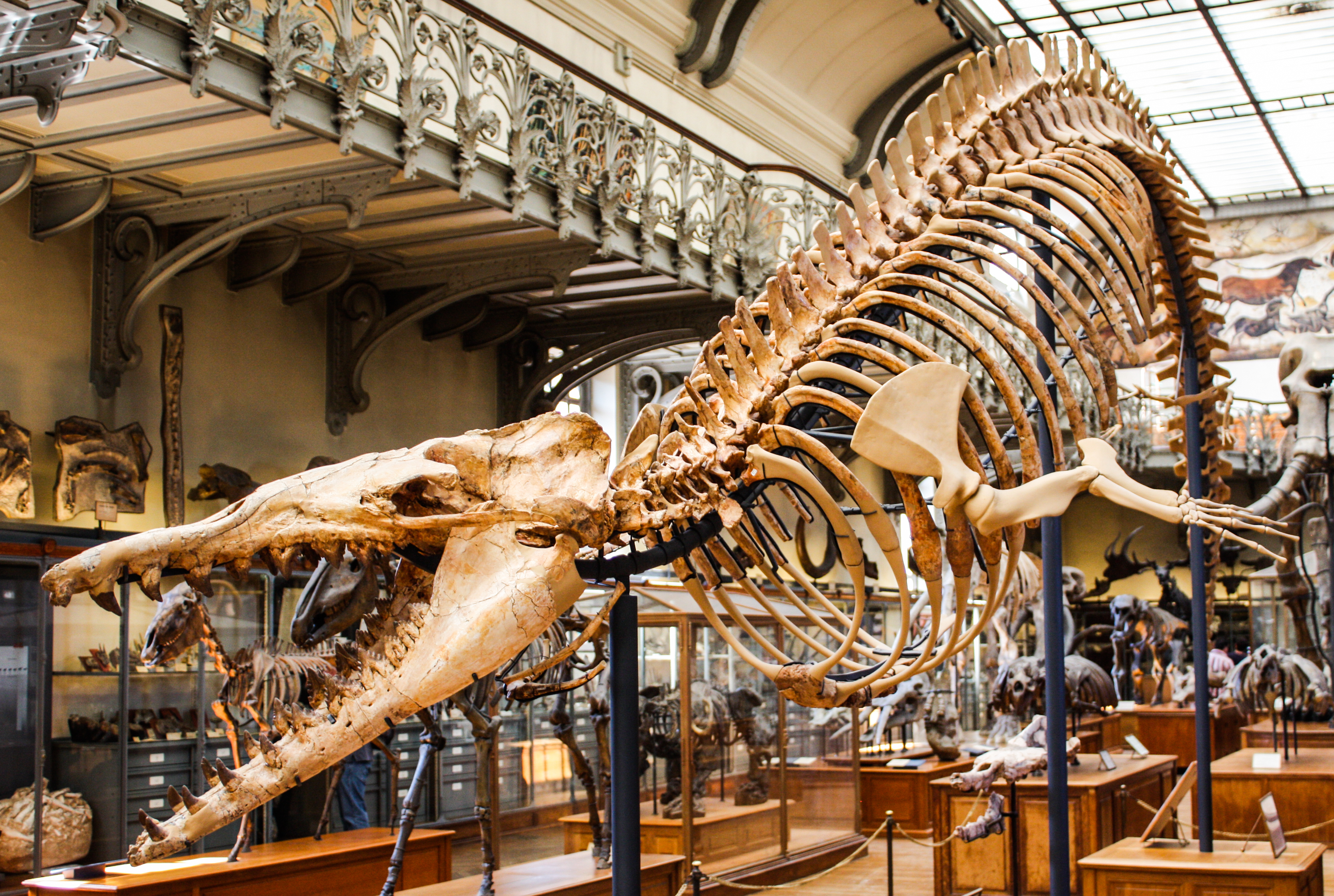
- Mounted fossilized skeleton of the Eocene whale Cynthiacetus
  †Cynthiacetus
- Cypraea
- Cypraedia
- †Cytherideis
- Daphnella
- Dasyatis
- Dasypus
  - †Dasypus bellus
- Dendrophyllia
- Dentalium
- Desmognathus
  - †Desmognathus ochrophaeus
- Diadophis
  - †Diadophis punctatus
- Dichocoenia
- †Dinematichthys
- †Dinohyus
  - †Dinohyus hollandi – or unidentified related form
- Diodon – tentative report
- Diodora
- Discorbis
- Distorsio
- †Dolicholatirus – tentative report
- Donax
- Dorsanum
- Dosinia – tentative report
- Dumetella
  - †Dumetella carolinensis
- †Echinopsis – tentative report
- †Ectopistes
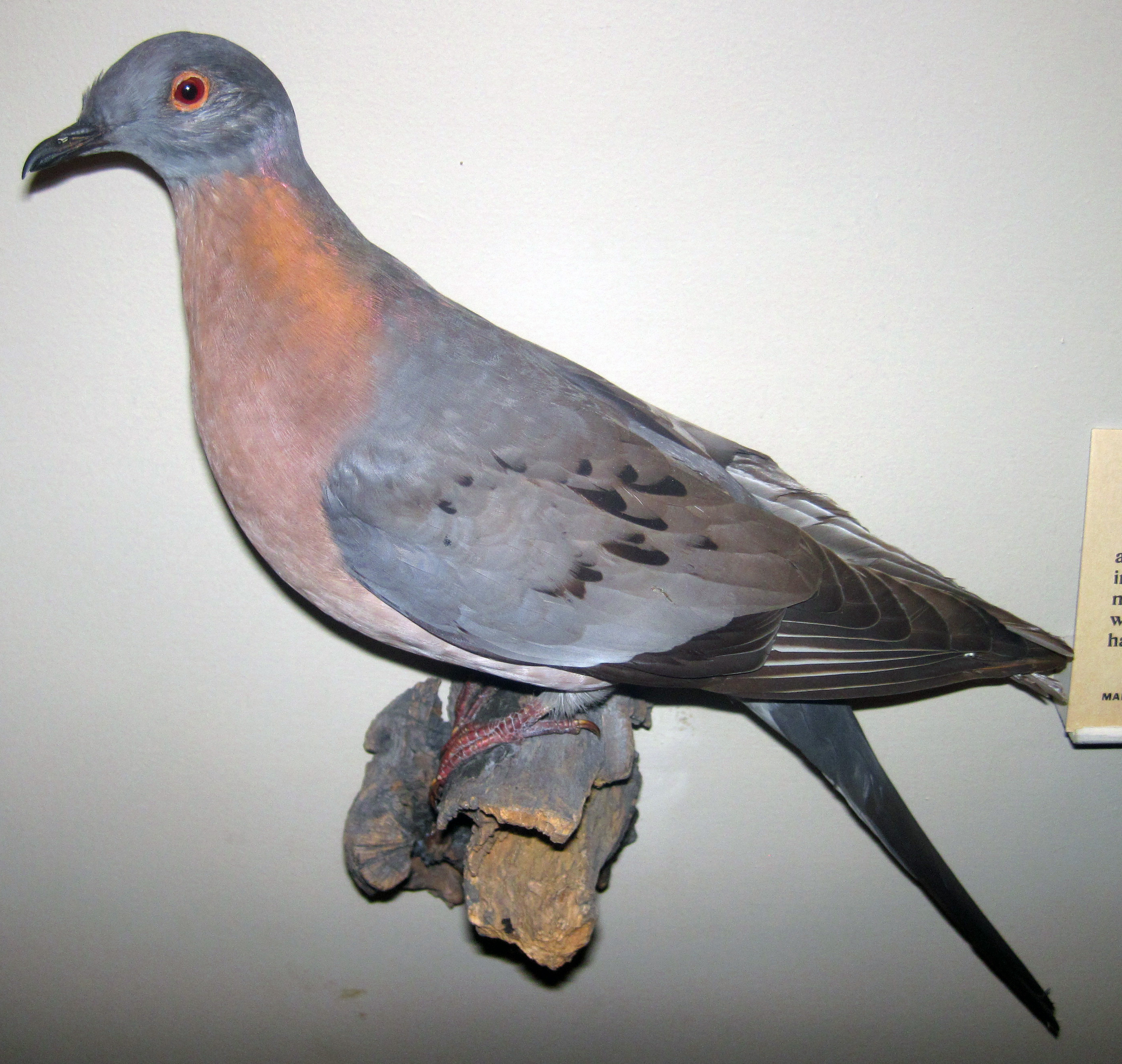
  - Taxidermied male Ectopistes migratorius, or passenger pigeon
    †Ectopistes migratorius
- †Egertonia
- Elaphe
  - †Elaphe guttata – or unidentified comparable form
  - †Elaphe vulpina
- †Elimia
- Emarginula
- †Eosurcula
- †Epicyon
  - †Epicyon haydeni – or unidentified comparable form
- Epitonium
- Eptesicus
  - †Eptesicus fuscus
- Equus
- Ervilia
- Erycina
- Eulima
- Eulimella – report made of unidentified related form or using admittedly obsolete nomenclature
- Eupleura
- †Eurycea
- Euspira
- Euthria
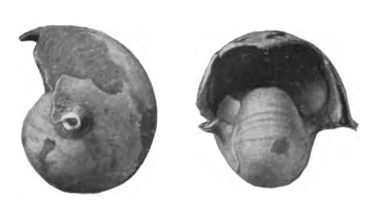
- Illustration in multiple views of a fossilized shell of the Late Jurassic-Miocene nautiloid cephalopod Eutrephoceras
  †Eutrephoceras
- Evalea
- †Exilia
- †Exogyra
  - †Exogyra costata
- Falco
  - †Falco sparverius
- †Ficopsis
- Fimbria
- Fissurella
- Flabellum
- Fulgurofusus
- Fustiaria
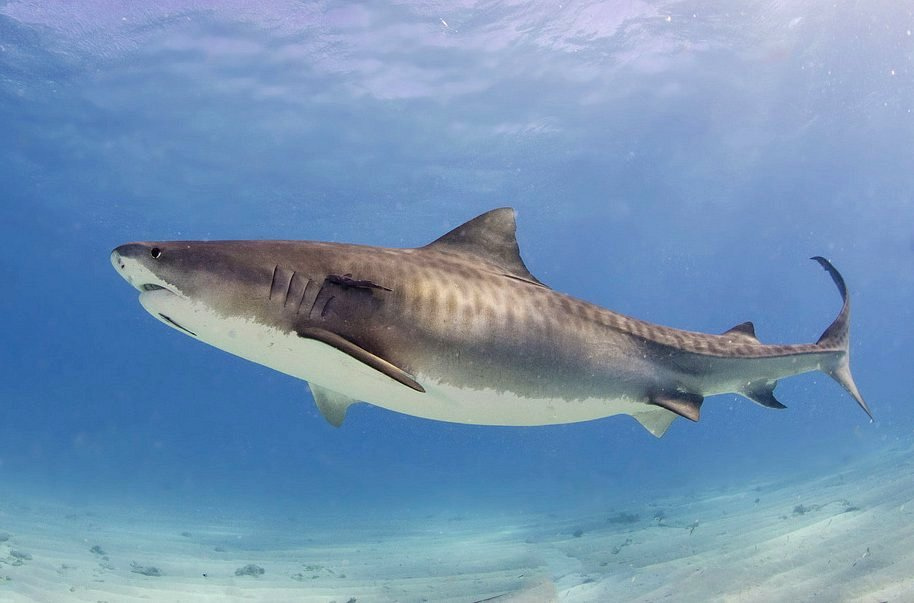
- A living Galeocerdo requiem shark
  Galeocerdo
- Galeodea
- Galeorhinus
- Gari
- Gastrochaena
- Gavia
  - †Gavia immer
- Gegania
- Gemma
- Genota
- Geodia
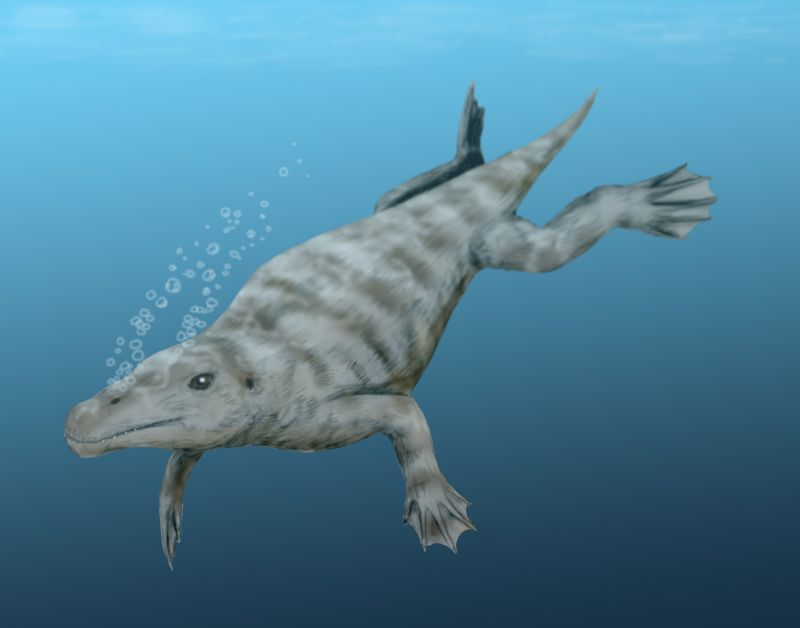
- Life restoration of the Eocene whale Georgiacetus
  †Georgiacetus
  - †Georgiacetus vogtlensis
- †Gigantostrea
- Ginglymostoma
- Glossus
- Glycymeris
- Glyptoactis
- Goniopora
- Graptemys
  - †Graptemys geographica
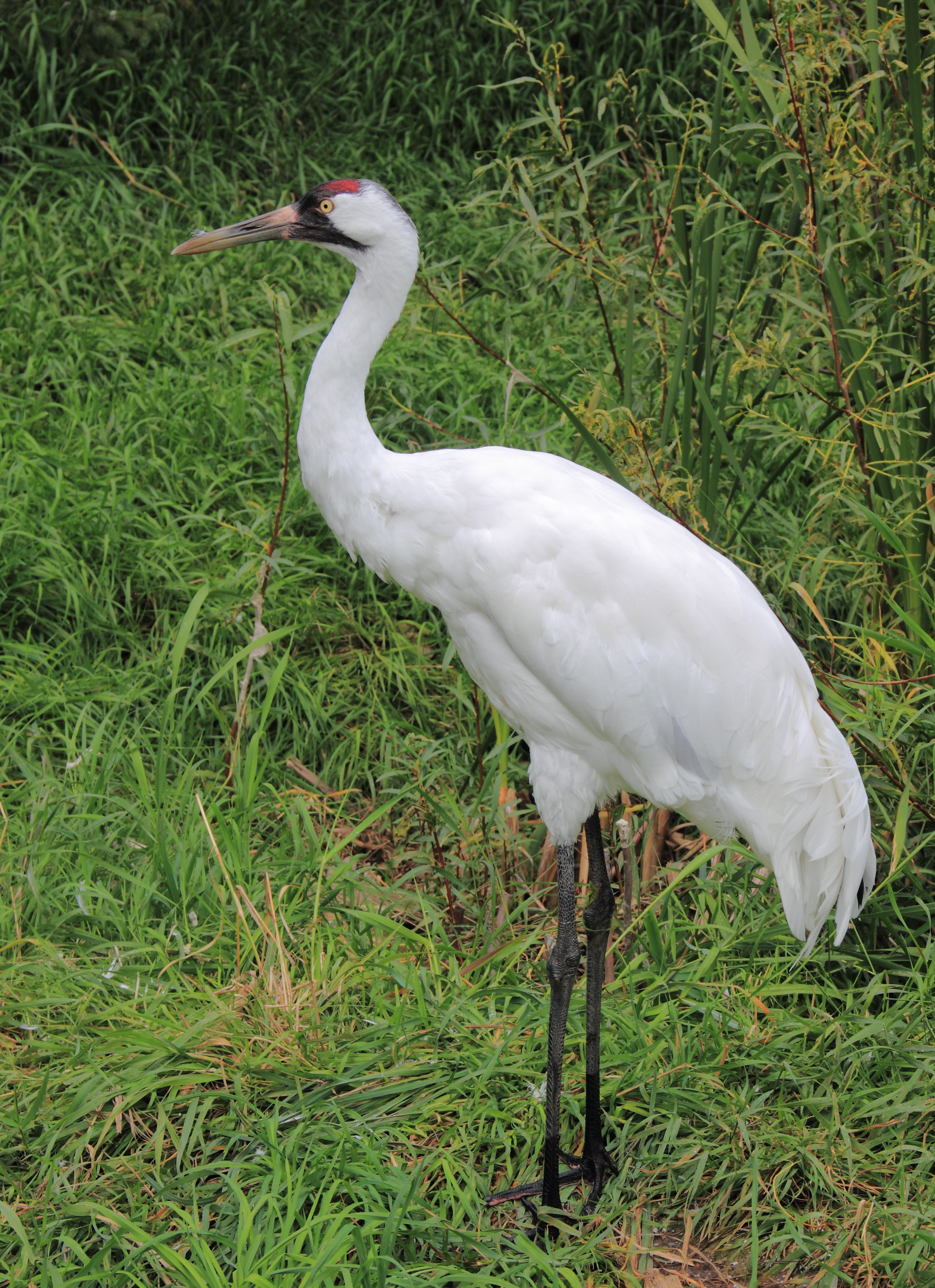
- A living Grus americana, or whooping crane
  Grus
- Gyroidina
- Haliaeetus
  - †Haliaeetus leucocephalus – or unidentified comparable form
- †Hamulus
- Hastula
- Haustator
- Hemipristis
  - †Hemipristis curvatus
- †Hemisurcula
- Heterodon
  - †Heterodon platirhinos – or unidentified comparable form
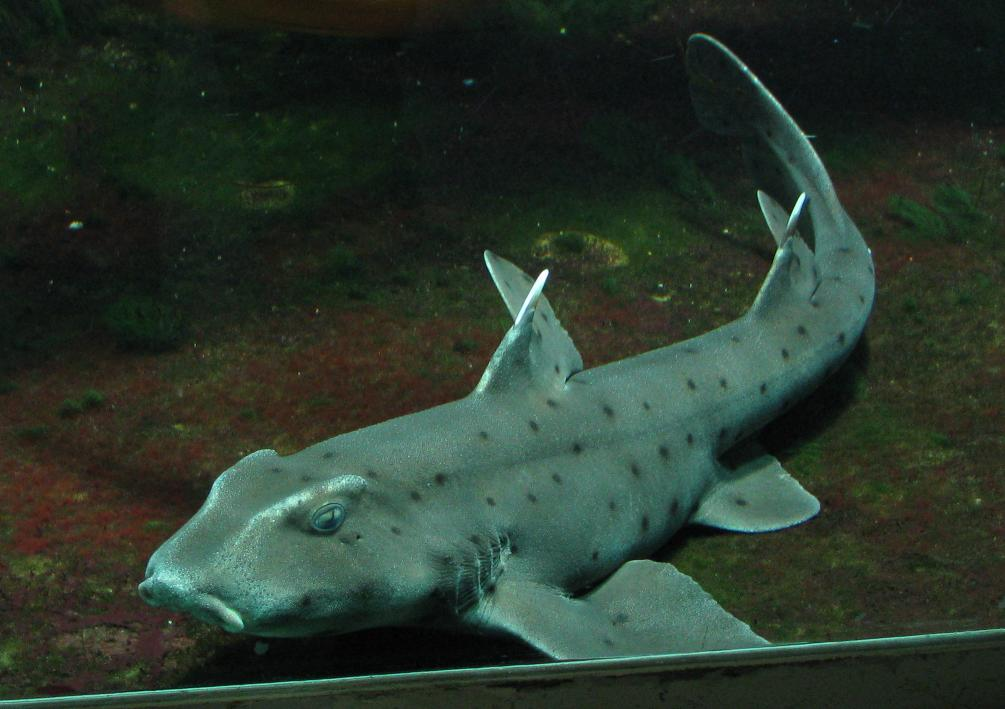
- A living Heterodontus, or bullhead shark
  Heterodontus
- Hexaplex
- Hipponix
- Hyla
  - †Hyla gratiosa
- †Hyposaurus
  - †Hyposaurus rogersii
- Isognomon
- †Jefitchia
- Kuphus
- †Lacunaria
- Laevicardium
- Lamna
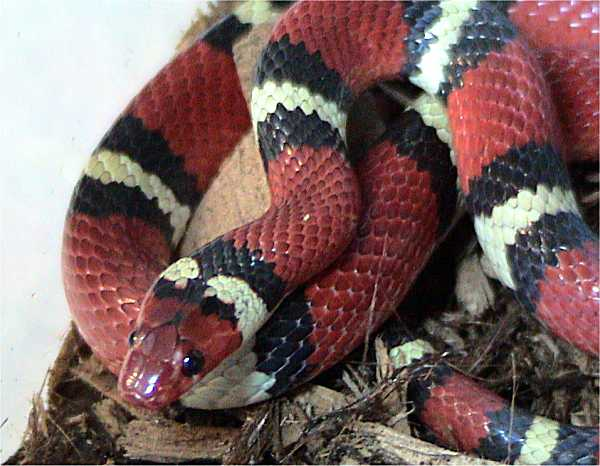
- Close-up of the head of a Lampropeltis , or kingsnake
  Lampropeltis
  - †Lampropeltis getulus
  - †Lampropeltis triangulum
- Latirus
- †Ledina
- Lepton
- Limacina
- Limaria
- Linga
- †Linthia
- †Linuparus
- Lithophaga
  - †Lithophaga nigra – or unidentified related form
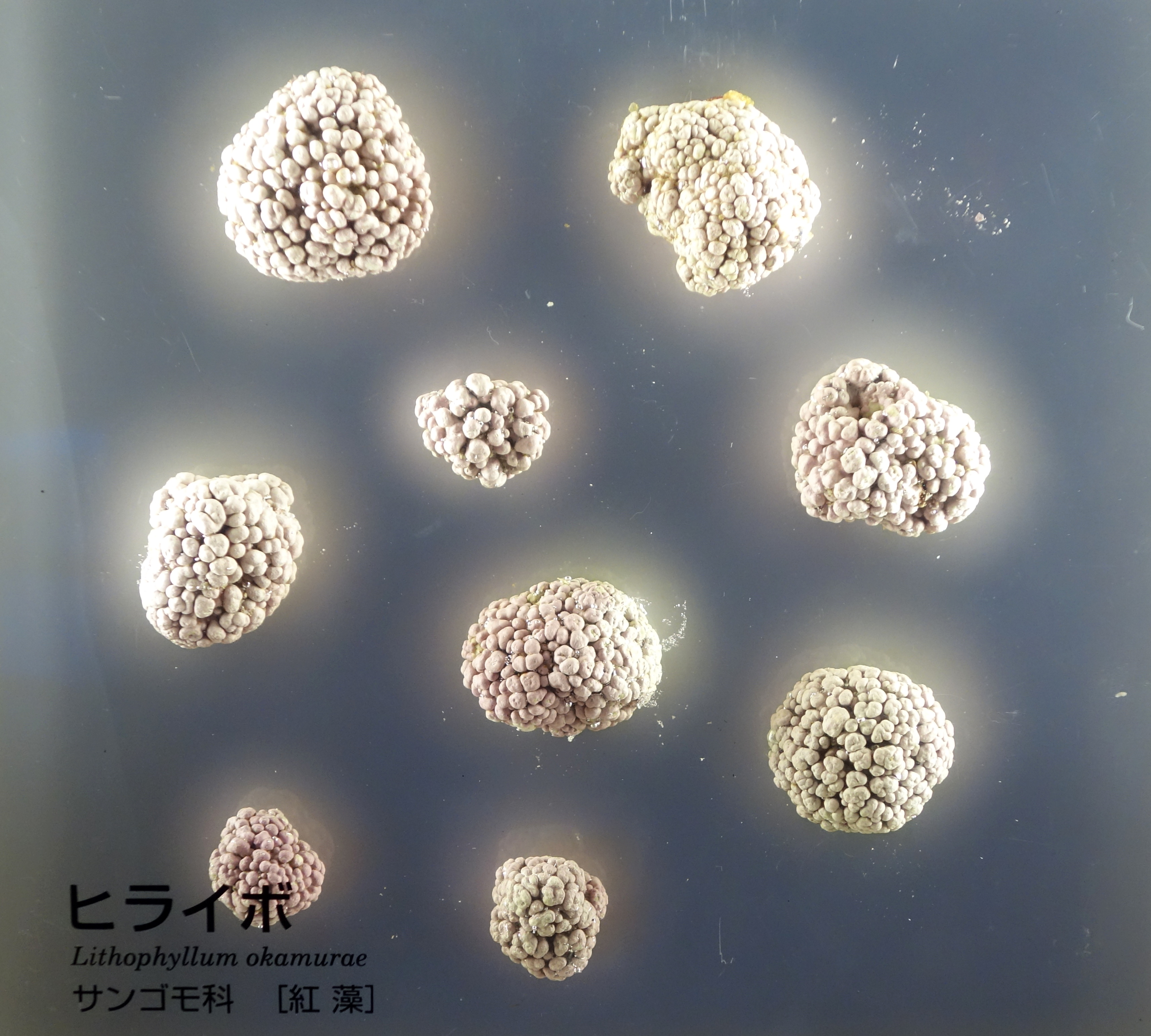
- Lithophyllum red algae
  Lithophyllum – tentative report
- Lithothamnion – tentative report
- Longchaeus
- Lopha
- Lucina
- Lunularia
- Lynx
  - †Lynx rufus
- Macoma
- Macrocallista
- †Mammut
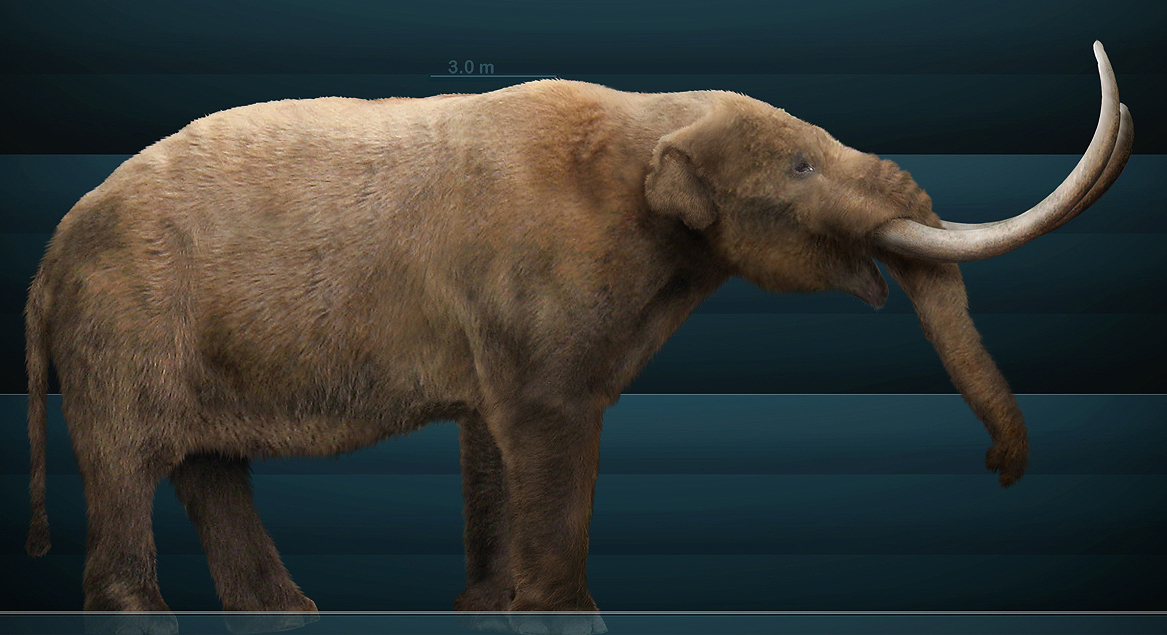
  - Restoration of a Mammut americanum, or American mastodon
    †Mammut americanum
- †Mammuthus
  - †Mammuthus columbi
- Margaretta
- Marginella
- Martesia
- †Mastigophora
- †Mathilda
- †Megalonyx
  - †Megalonyx jeffersonii
- Melanella
- Melanerpes
  - †Melanerpes carolinus – or unidentified comparable form
- Melanopsis
- Meleagris
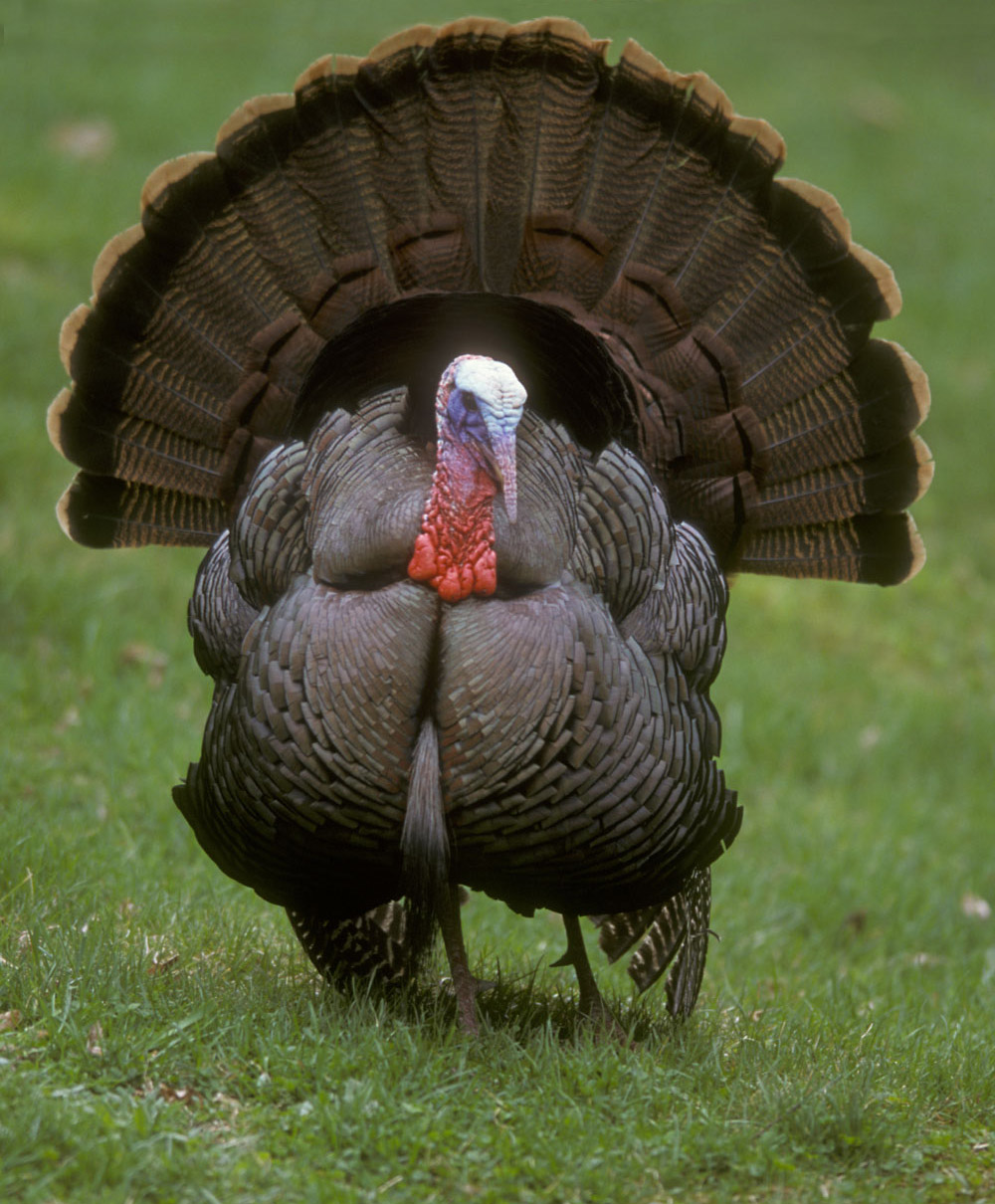
  - A wild male Meleagris gallopavo, or turkey, displaying his facial coloration and tail feathers to attract a female
    †Meleagris gallopavo
- Membranipora
- Meretrix
- Mergus
- Mesalia
- Mesophyllum
- Metula
- †Michela
- Microdrillia
- Micropora
- Microtus
  - †Microtus pennsylvanicus
- Mitrella
- Mitrolumna
- Modiolus
- Murex
- Murexiella
- Myliobatis
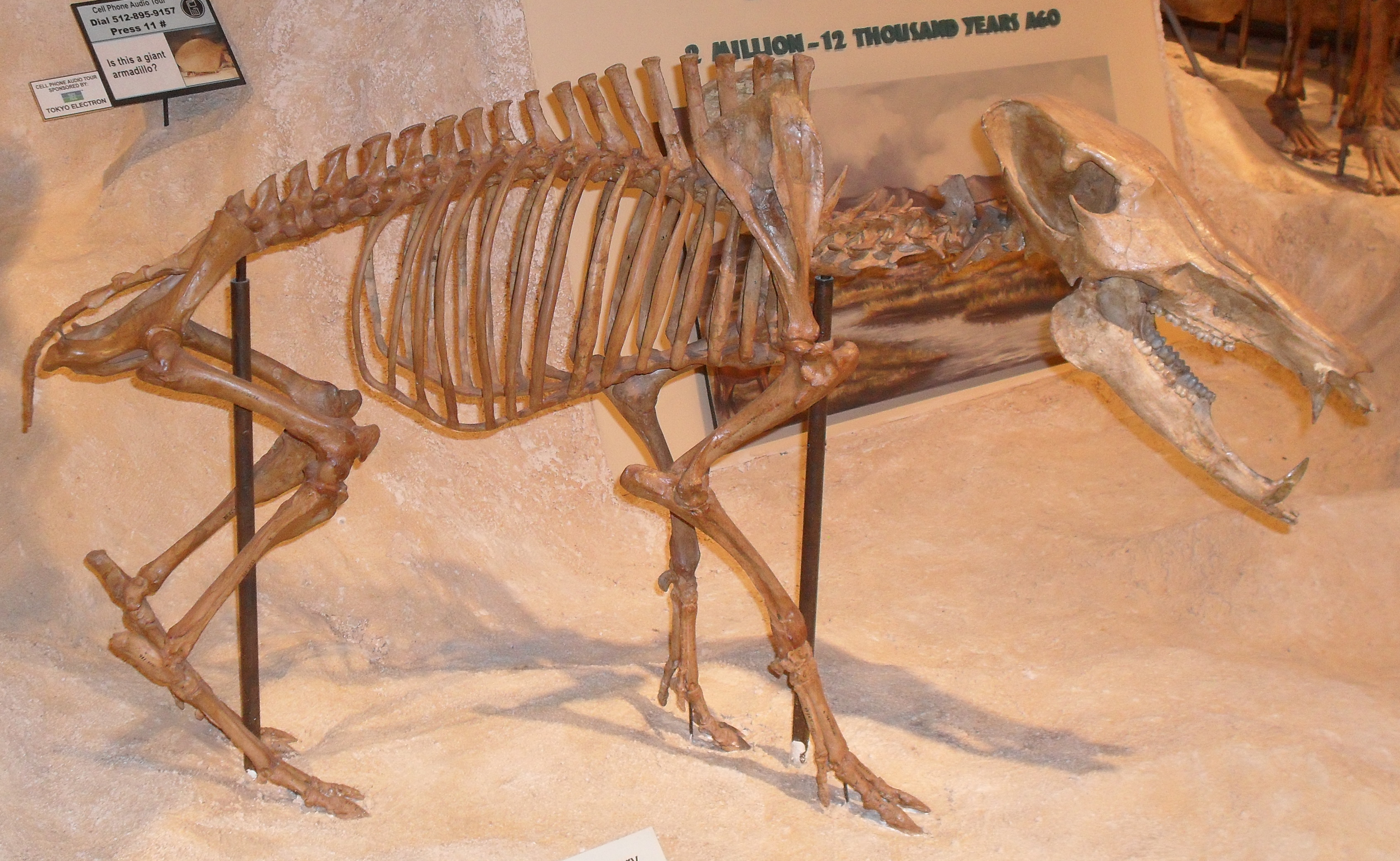
- Fossilized skeleton of the Pliocene-Holocene peccary Mylohyus
  †Mylohyus
  - †Mylohyus fossilis
- Myotis
  - †Myotis lucifugus
- †Nannippus
- Narona
- Nassarius
- Natica
- Naticarius
- Nebrius
- Negaprion
- †Nemipterus
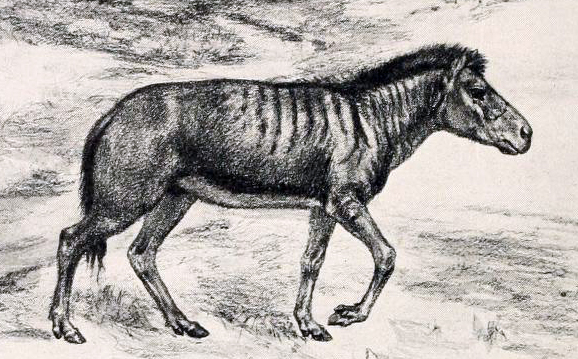
- Life restoration of a herd of Neohipparion. Robert Bruce Horsfall (1913).
  †Neohipparion
- Neotoma
  - †Neotoma floridana
- Neritina
- Nerodia
- Neverita
- Niso
- Norrisia
- Nucula
- Nycticeius
  - †Nycticeius humeralis
- Oculina – type locality for genus
- Odocoileus
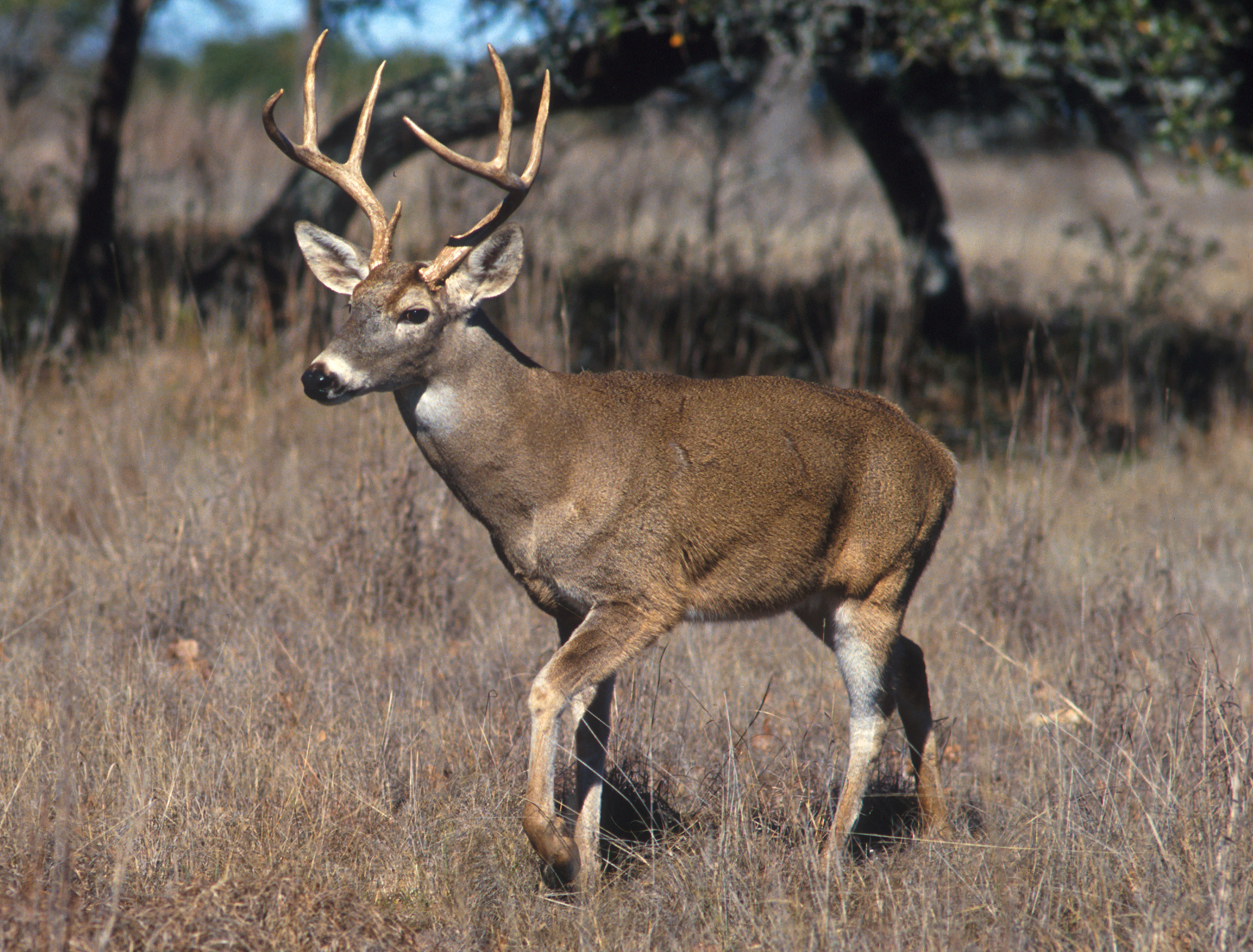
  - A living Odocoileus virginianus, or white-tailed deer
    †Odocoileus virginianus
- Odontaspis
- Odostomia
- Oliva
- Olivella
- Opheodrys
  - †Opheodrys aestivus
- Ostrea
- †Otodus
- Otus
  - †Otus asio
- †Oxyrhina
- †Pachecoa
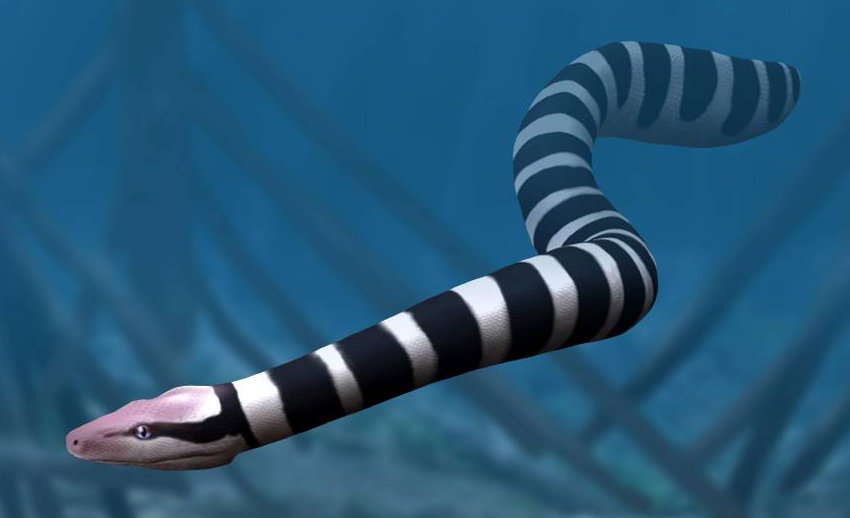
- Restoration of the Cretaceous-Eocene sea snake Palaeophis
  †Palaeophis
- Panopea
- Panthera
  - †Panthera onca
- Pasithea
- Pecten
- †Pediomeryx
- Pekania
  - †Pekania pennanti
- Pelecyora
- Penion
- Peromyscus
- Petricola
- Phalium
- Philine
- Pholadomya
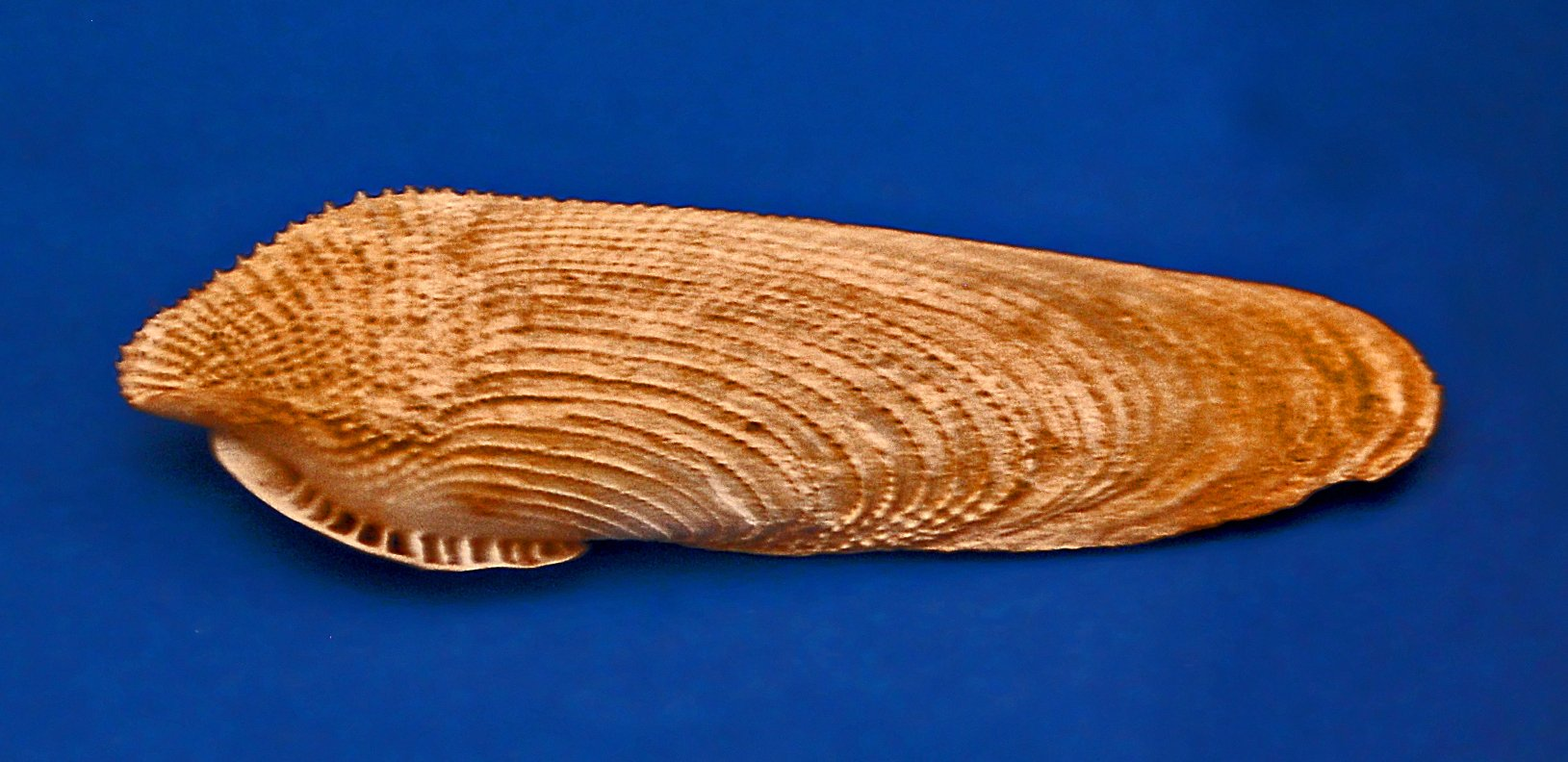
- Shell of a Pholas, or angelwing
  Pholas
- Phos
- Phyllodus
- Pica
  - †Pica pica
- Picoides
  - †Picoides villosus – or unidentified comparable form
- Pinna
- Pipistrellus
- Piranga
  - †Piranga olivacea – or unidentified comparable form
- Pitar
- †Planaria – report made of unidentified related form or using admittedly obsolete nomenclature
- Planorbis – or unidentified comparable form
- †Pleiolama
- Plethodon
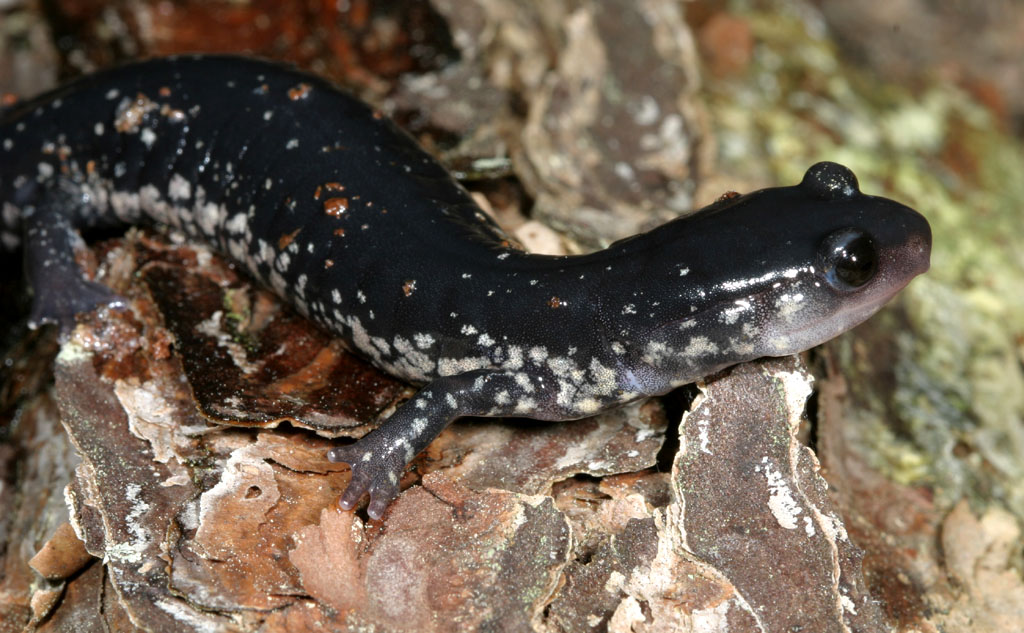
  - A living Plethodon glutinosus, or northern slimy salamander
    †Plethodon glutinosus
- Pleurofusia
- Pleuromeris
- †Pleurostoma
- Pleurotomaria – report made of unidentified related form or using admittedly obsolete nomenclature
- Pleurotomella
- Plicatula
- Podilymbus
  - †Podilymbus podiceps
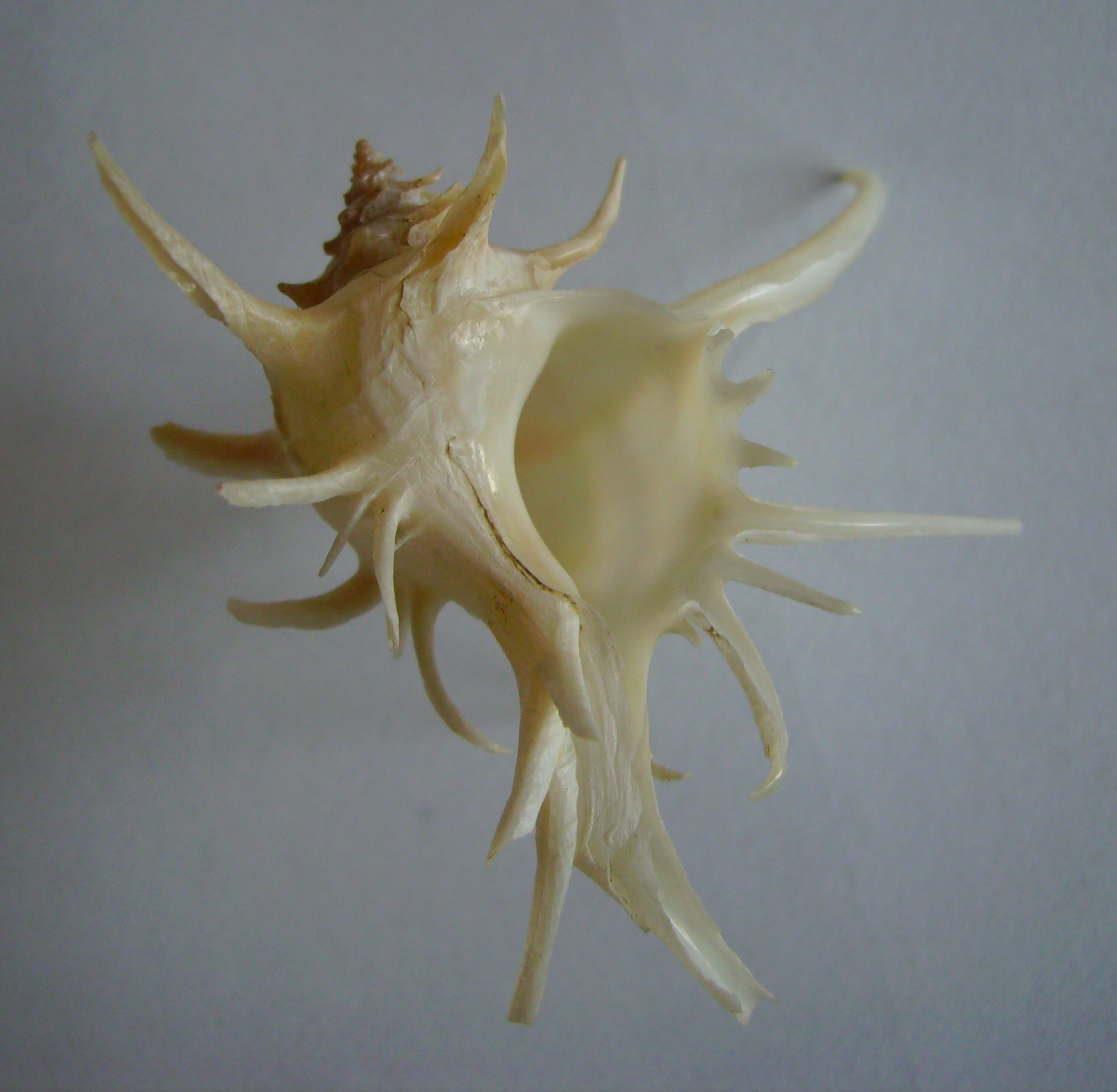
- Shell of a Poirieria murex snail
  Poirieria
- Polinices
- Polyschides
- Pomatodelphis
- †Pontogeneus
- Porella
- Porina
- †Potamides – report made of unidentified related form or using admittedly obsolete nomenclature
- Pristis
- Propeamussium
- †Protocardia
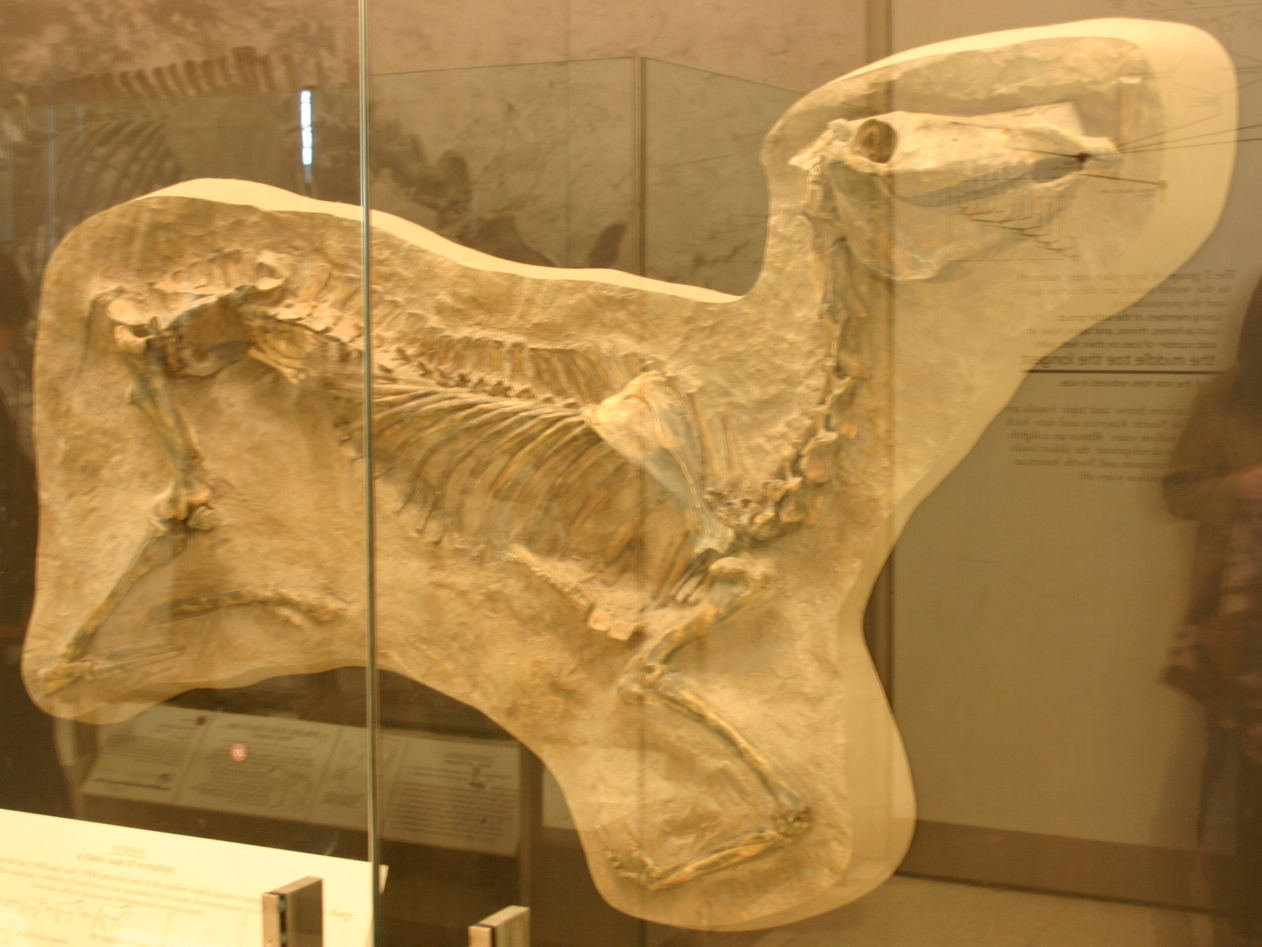
- Fossilized skeleton of the Miocene horse Protohippus
  †Protohippus
- Prunum
- Pseudemys
- †Pseudolatirus
- Pseudoliva
- Pteria
- Pterothrissus
- Pterynotus
- Pycnodonte
- Pyramidella
- †Pyrgulina
- Quinqueloculina
- Quiscalus
  - †Quiscalus quiscula
- Raja
- †Rana
  - †Rana catesbeiana
  - †Rana pipiens
- Rangifer
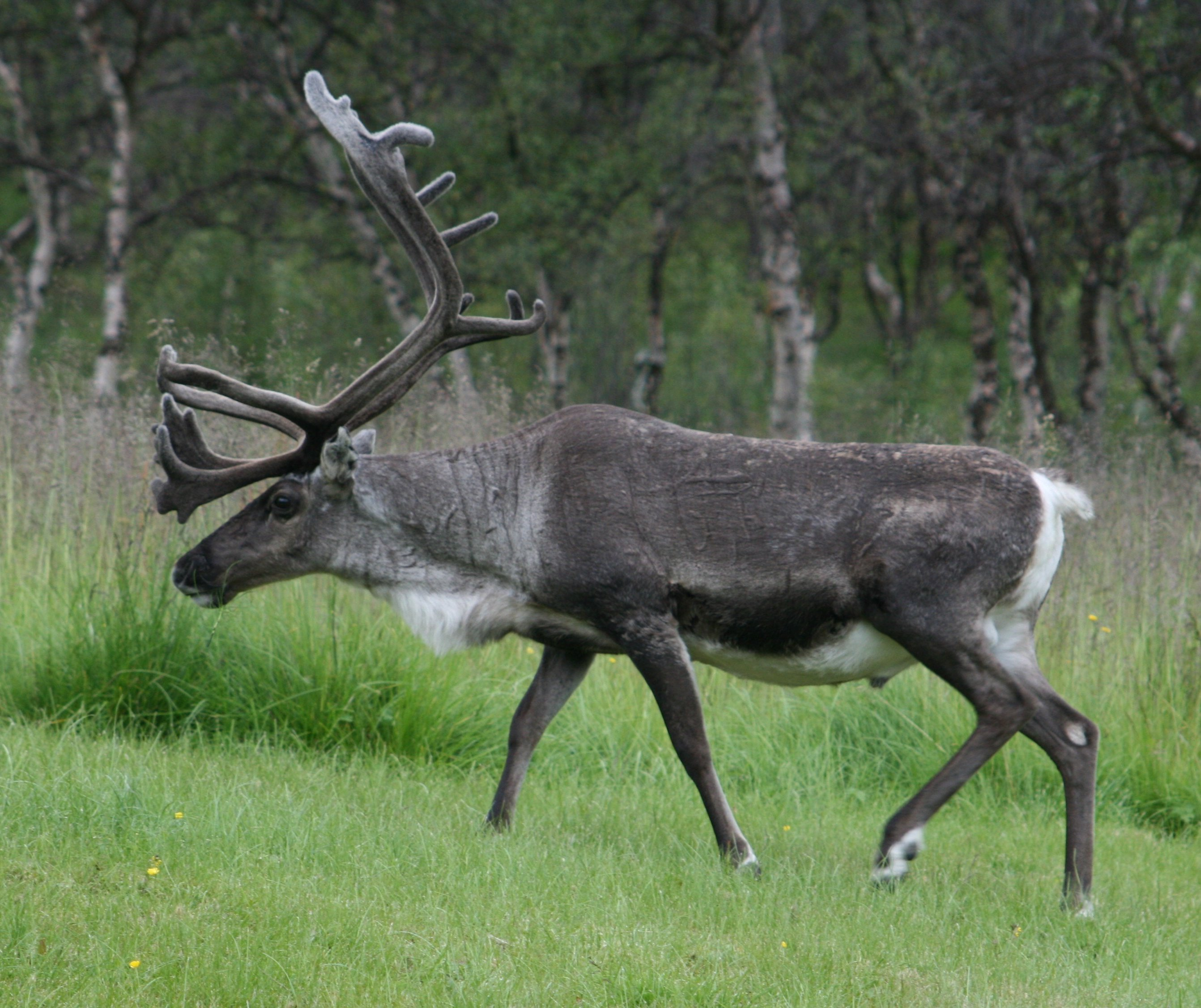
  - A living Rangifer tarandus, or reindeer
    †Rangifer tarandus
- Raphitoma
- Reithrodontomys
- Reteporella
- Retusa
- Rhinobatos
- Rhinoclavis
- Rhinoptera
- Rhizoprionodon
- Rhynchoconger
- Rimella
- Ringicula
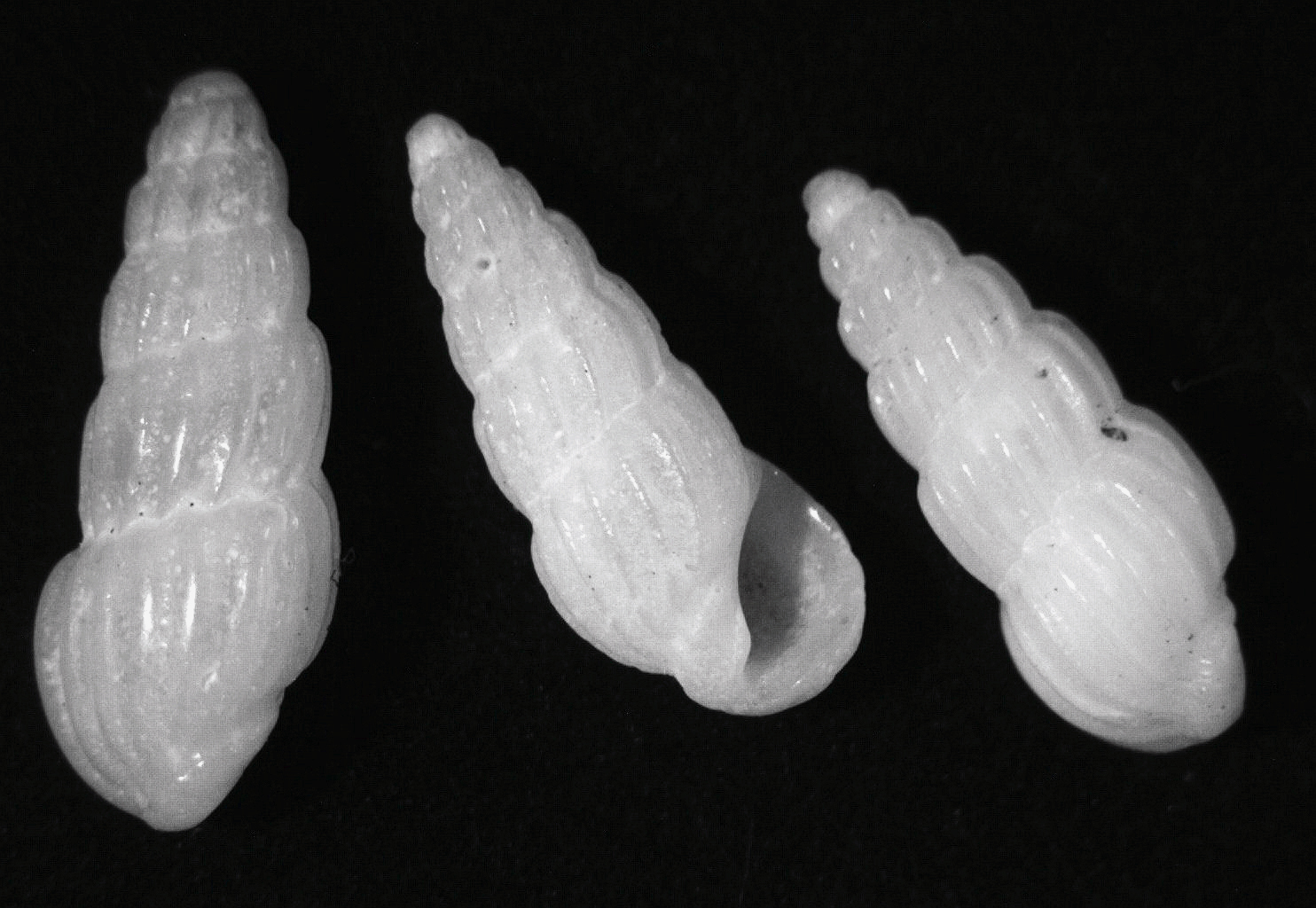
- Fossilized shells of the sea snail Rissoina
  Rissoina
- Rostellaria
- †Rotularia
- Sassia
- Sayornis
  - †Sayornis phoebe – or unidentified comparable form
- Scaphander
- Scaphella
- †Sceptrum
- Schizaster
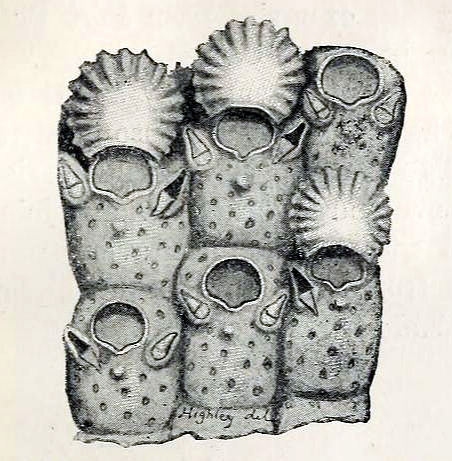
- Illustration of a close-up view of a Schizoporella bryozoan ("moss animal")
  Schizoporella
- Scolopax
  - †Scolopax minor
- Scyliorhinus
- Seila
- Semele
- Serpula
- Serpulorbis
- Siderastrea
- Sigatica
- Sinum
- Siphonalia
- Siphonochelus
- Skena
- Skenea
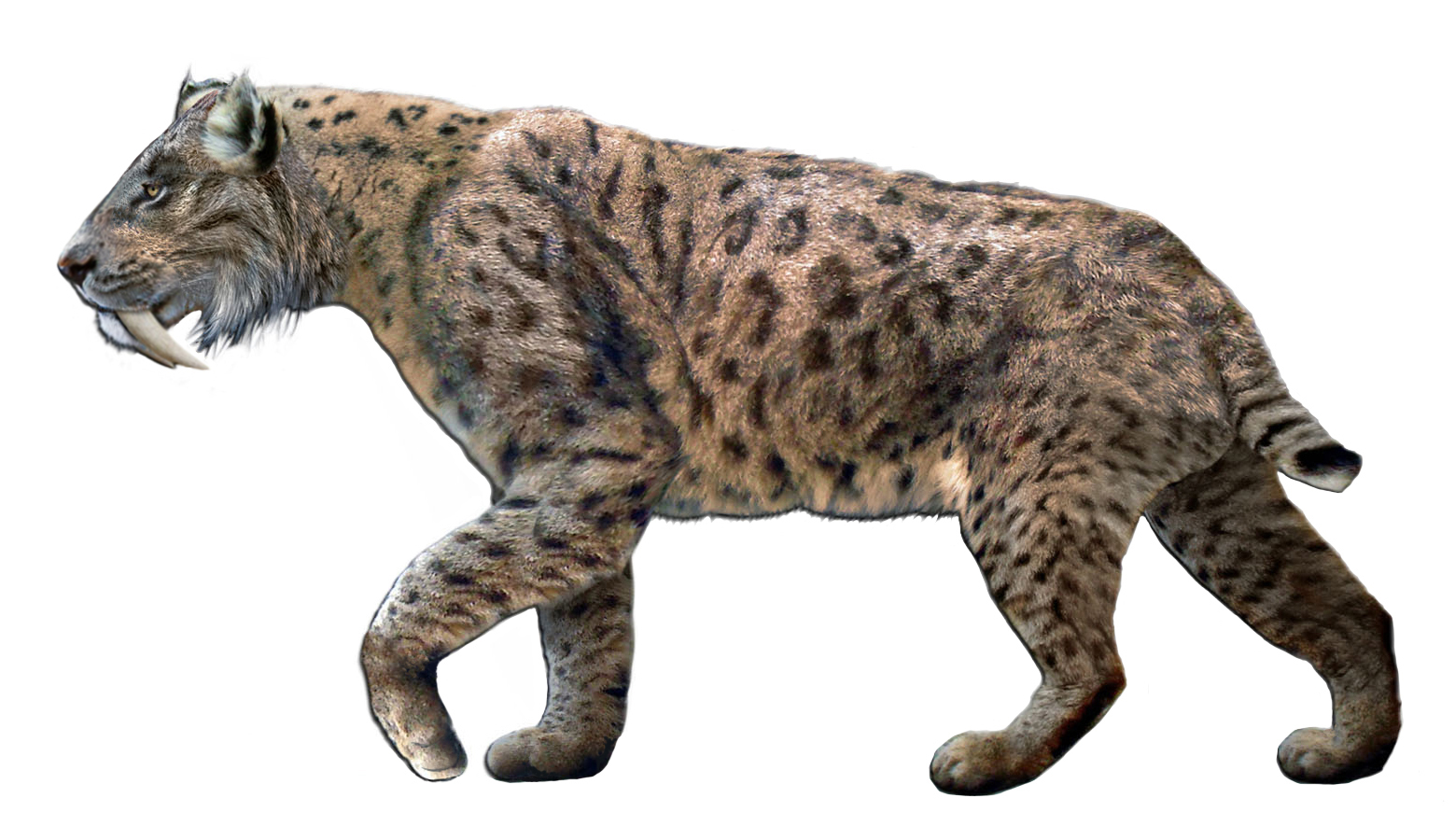
- Life restoration of the Pleistocene-Holocene saber-tooth cat Smilodon
  †Smilodon
  - †Smilodon fatalis
- Solariella
- Solemya
- Sorex
- Sphyraena – tentative report
- Sphyrna
- Spilogale – tentative report
  - †Spilogale putorius
- Spirorbis
- †Spirorbula – tentative report
- Spisula
- Spondylus
- Sterna
- Stomachetosella
- Storeria
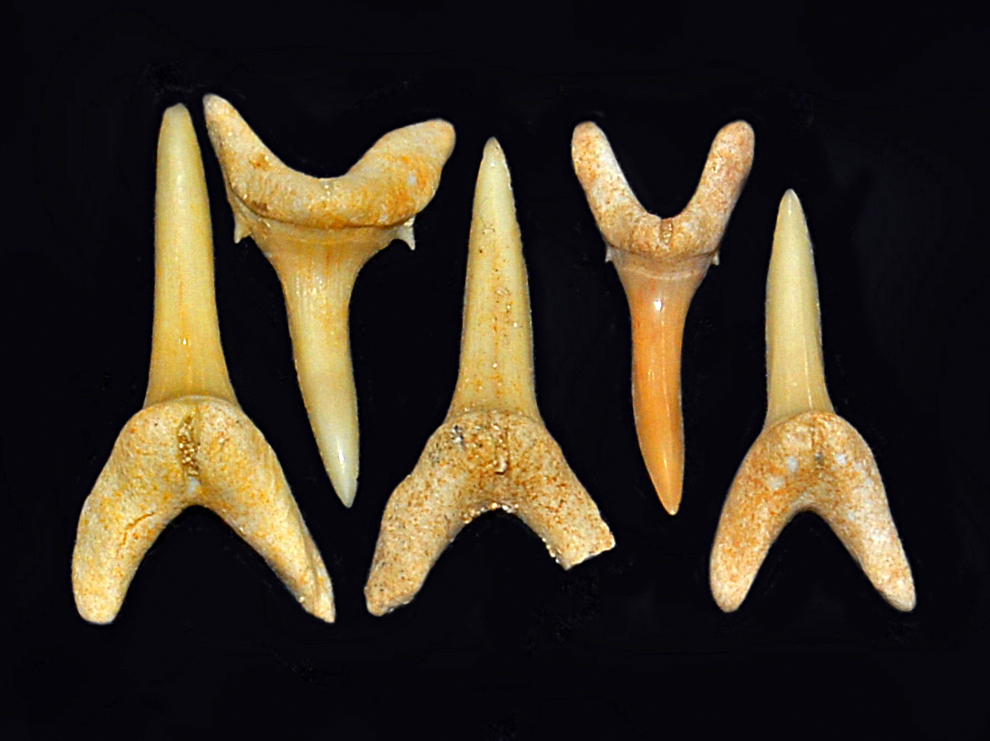
- Fossilized teeth of the Paleocene-Miocene sandshark Striatolamia
  †Striatolamia
- Strioturbonilla
- Strix
  - †Strix varia – or unidentified comparable form
- Strombus
- Stylophora
- Sveltella
- Sveltia
- Sylvilagus
- †Synthetoceras
  - †Synthetoceras tricornatus – or unidentified comparable form
- Tapirus
- Teinostoma
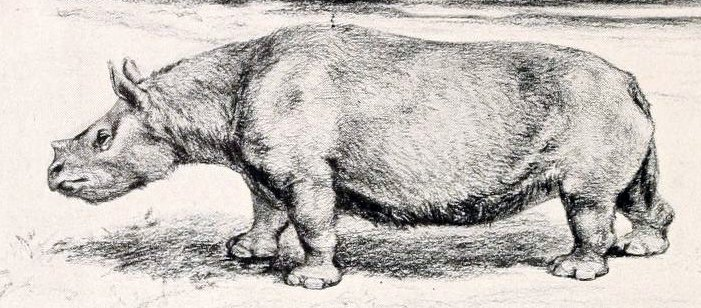
- Restoration of the Miocene-Pliocene rhinoceros Teleoceras
  †Teleoceras
- Tellina
- Temnocidaris – tentative report
- Tenagodus
- Terebra
- Teredo
- Textularia
- Thamnophis
  - †Thamnophis sirtalis
- Thiara
- Tornus
- Trachyphyllia
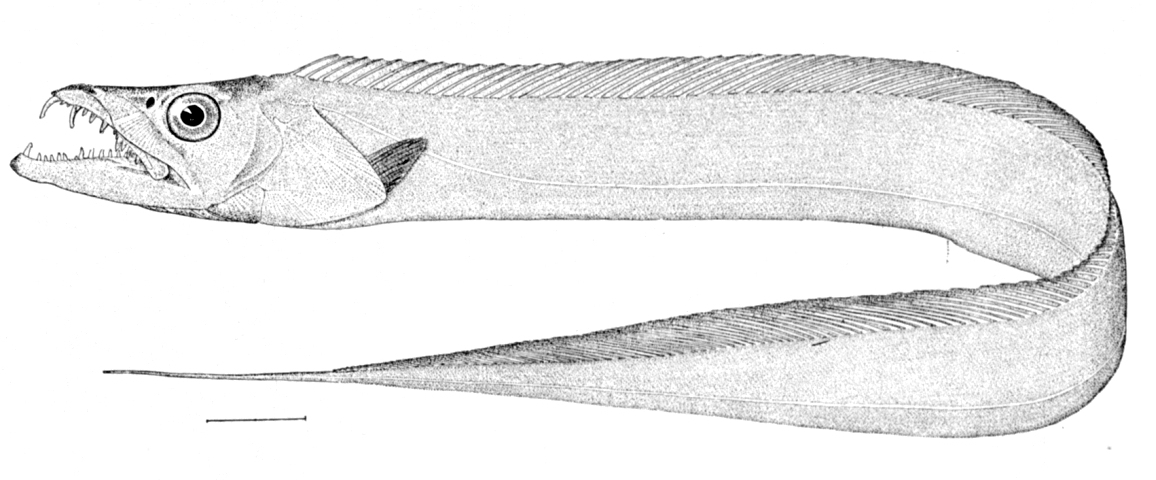
- Illustration of a living Trichiurus cutlassfish
  Trichiurus
- Trigonostoma
- †Trinacria
- Trionyx
- Triphora
- †Tripia
- Trochita
- Trochus – report made of unidentified related form or using admittedly obsolete nomenclature
- Trophon
- Turbinella – or unidentified related form
- Turbo – report made of unidentified related form or using admittedly obsolete nomenclature
- Turbonilla
- Turdus
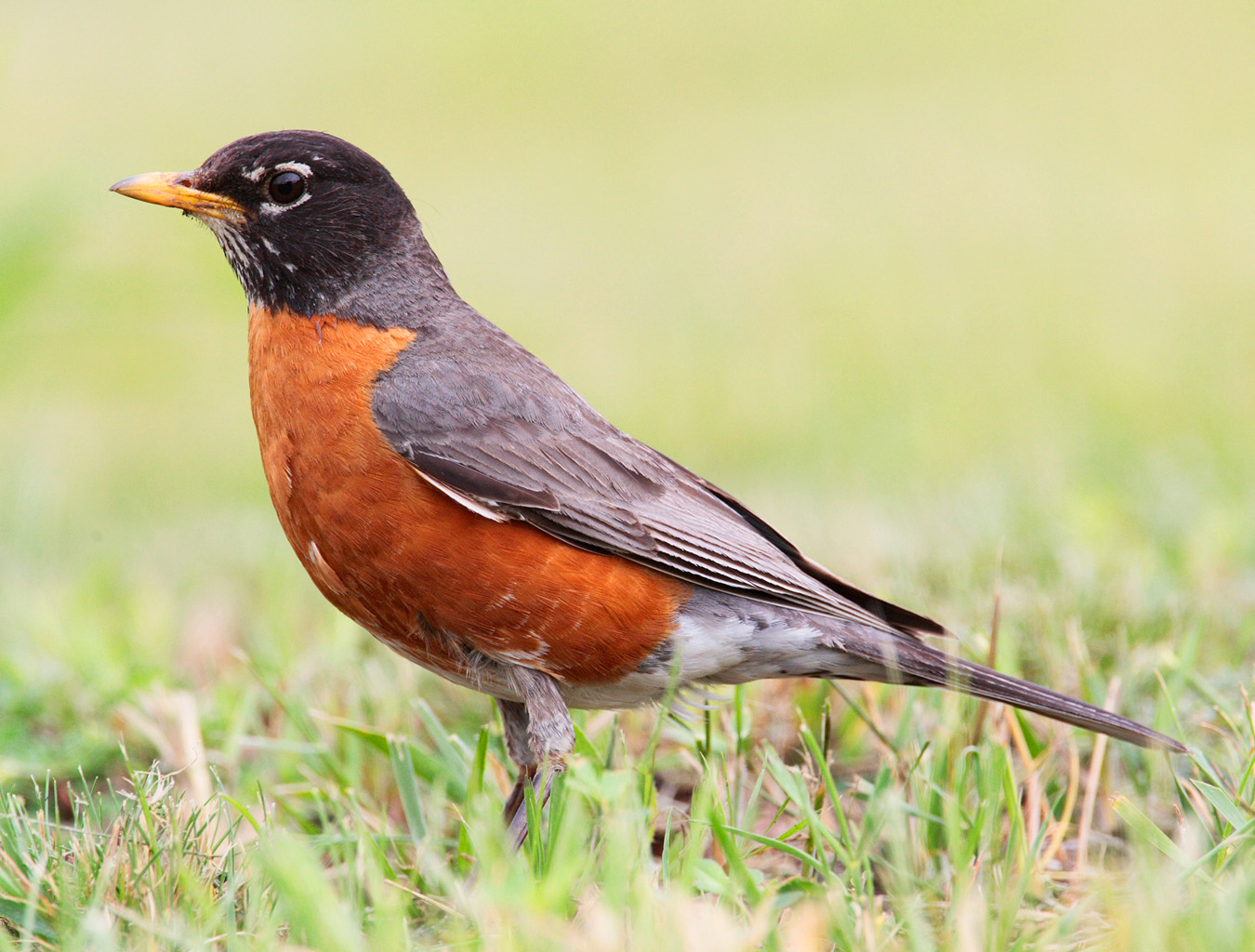
  - A living Turdus migratorius, or American robin
    †Turdus migratorius
- Turricula
- Turris
- Turritella
- Tylocidaris
- Tympanuchus
  - †Tympanuchus cupido
- Umbraculum
- Ursus
  - †Ursus americanus
- Venericardia
- Verticordia
- Vitrinella
- †Volvariella
- Xenophora
- Xylophaga
- Yoldia
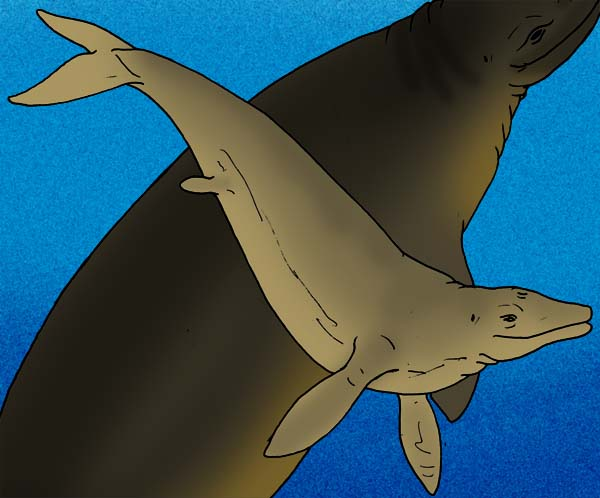
- Life restoration of the Eocene whale Zygorhiza
  †Zygorhiza
  - †Zygorhiza kochii – type locality for species
