= List of the prehistoric life of Georgia (U.S. state) =

This list of the prehistoric life of Georgia (U.S. state) contains the various prehistoric life-forms whose fossilized remains have been reported from within the US state of Georgia (U.S. state).

== Precambrian ==
The Paleobiology Database records no known occurrences of Precambrian fossils in Alabama.

== Paleozoic ==
=== Selected Paleozoic taxa of Georgia ===
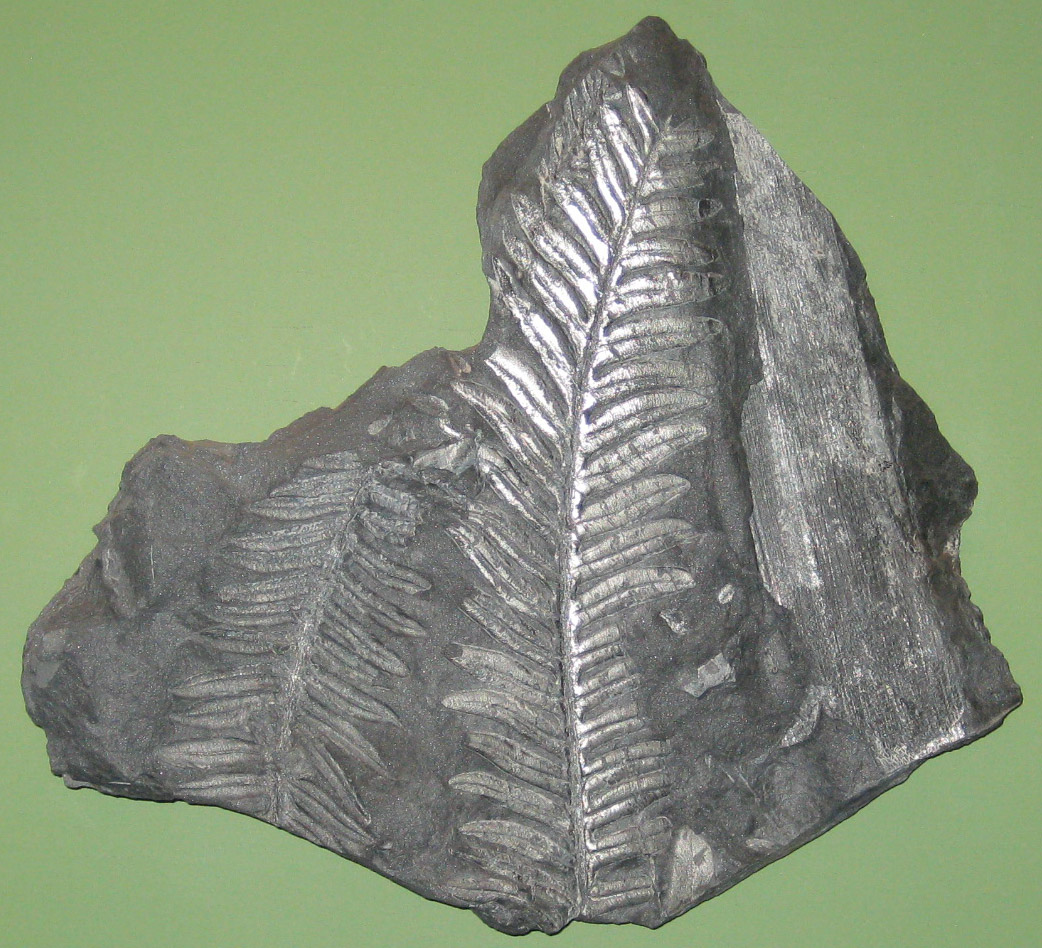
- Fossilized fronds of the Carboniferous-Early Cretaceous seed fern Alethopteris
  †Alethopteris
  - †Alethopteris decurrens
  - †Alethopteris lonchitica
  - †Alethopteris valida
- †Amplexus
- †Annularia
  - †Annularia asteris
  - †Annularia radiata
- †Archimedes
  - †Archimedes invaginatus
  - †Archimedes swallovanus
- †Asaphiscus
- †Atrypa
  - †Atrypa reticularis
- †Augustoceras
- †Bonneterrina – tentative report
  - †Brooksella alternata
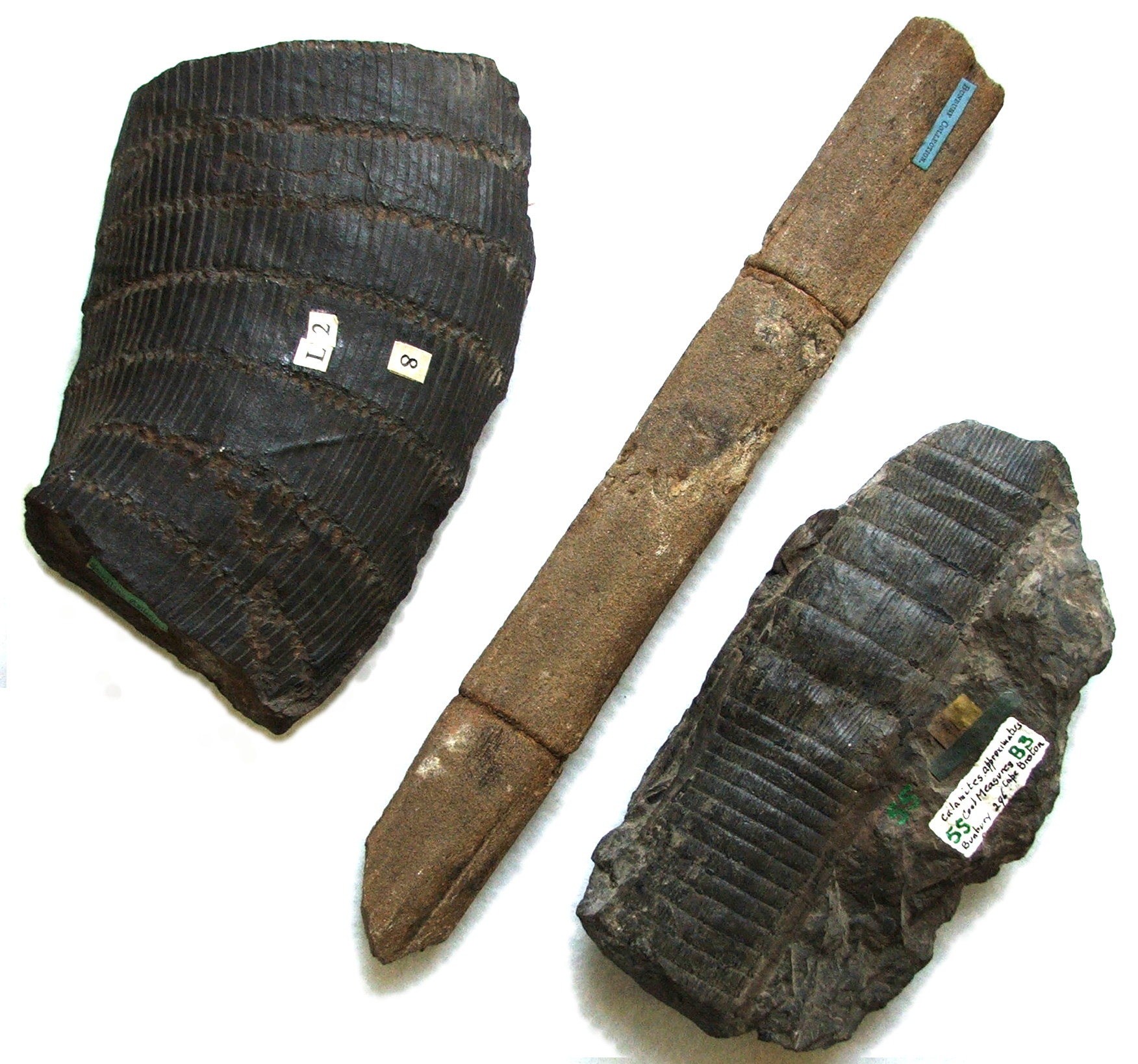
- Fossilized stems from the Carboniferous-Permian horsetail relative Calamites
  †Calamites
  - †Calamites suckowi
- †Callipteridium
- †Calymene
  - †Calymene celebra
- †Calyptaulax
- †Camarotoechia
- †Cincinnetina
  - †Cincinnetina meeki
  - †Cincinnetina multisecta
- †Columnaria
- †Constellaria
- †Coosella
- †Coosia
- †Cordaites
- †Cryptophragmus
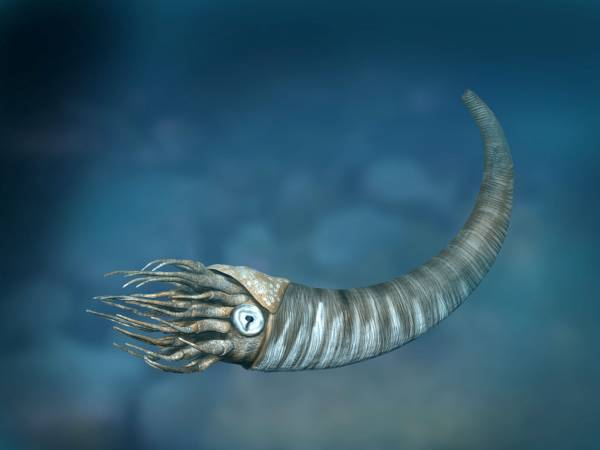
- Restoration of the Cambrian-Middle Devonian nautiloid cephalopod Cyrtoceras
  †Cyrtoceras
- †Dalmanitina
- †Dipleura
- †Elrathia
- †Elrathina – tentative report
- †Eospirifer
  - †Eospirifer radiatus
- †Favosites
  - †Favosites turbinatus
- †Flexicalymene
- †Gonioceras
- †Hallopora
- †Isotelus
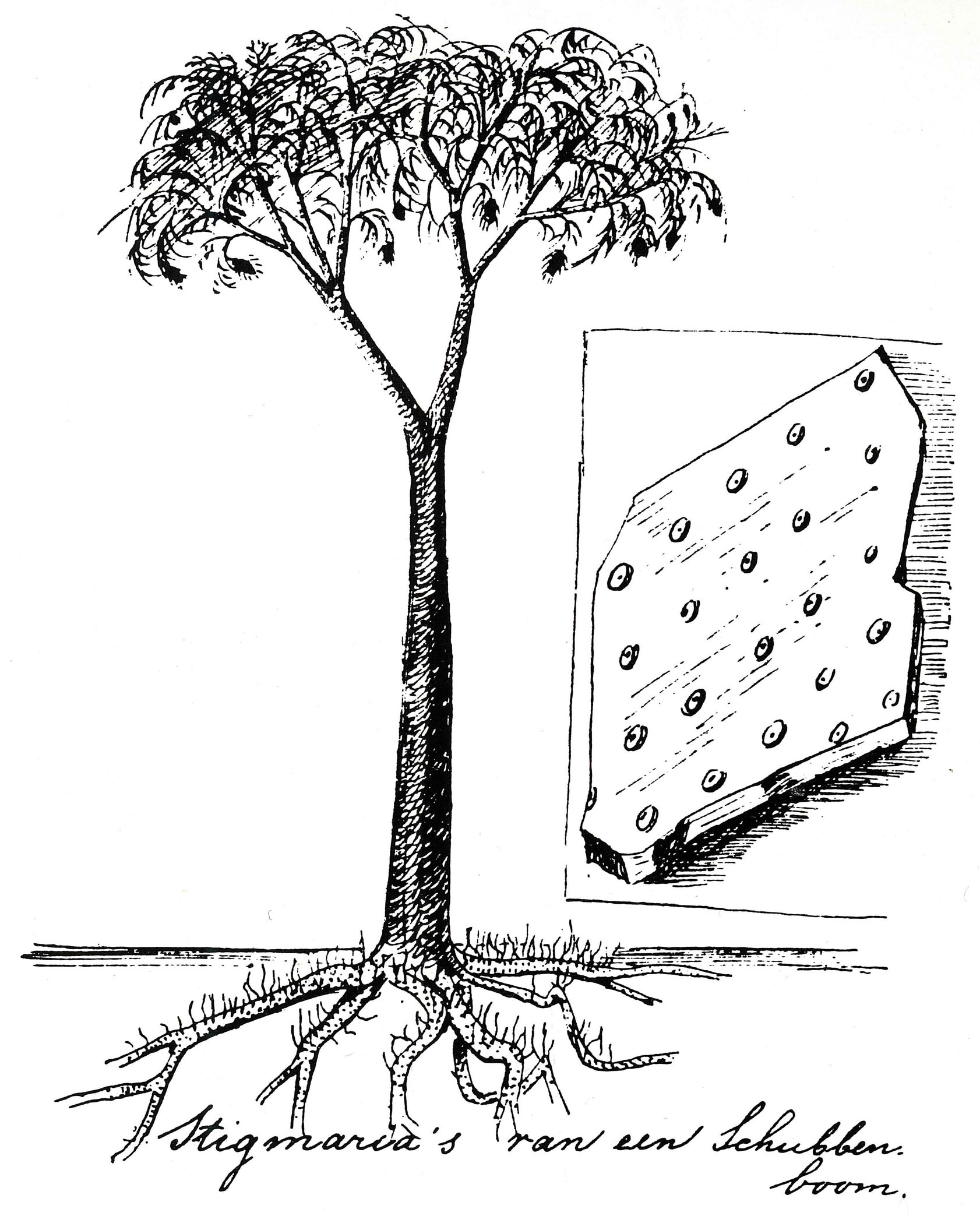
- Restoration of the Carboniferous-Late Triassic club moss relative Lepidodendron. Eli Heimans (1911).
  †Lepidodendron
  - †Lepidodendron aculeatum
  - †Lepidodendron obovatum
- †Lingula
- †Lithostrotion
- †Lyginopteris
- †Michelinoceras
- †Murchisonia
- †Neuropteris
  - †Neuropteris flexuosa
  - †Neuropteris heterophylla – or unidentified comparable form
- †Orthoceras
- †Pecopteris
  - †Pecopteris elliptica – tentative report
- †Pelagiella
- †Pentamerus
- †Pentremites
- †Peronopsis
- †Phacops
- †Phragmolites
- †Platycrinites
- †Platystrophia
  - †Platystrophia acutilirata
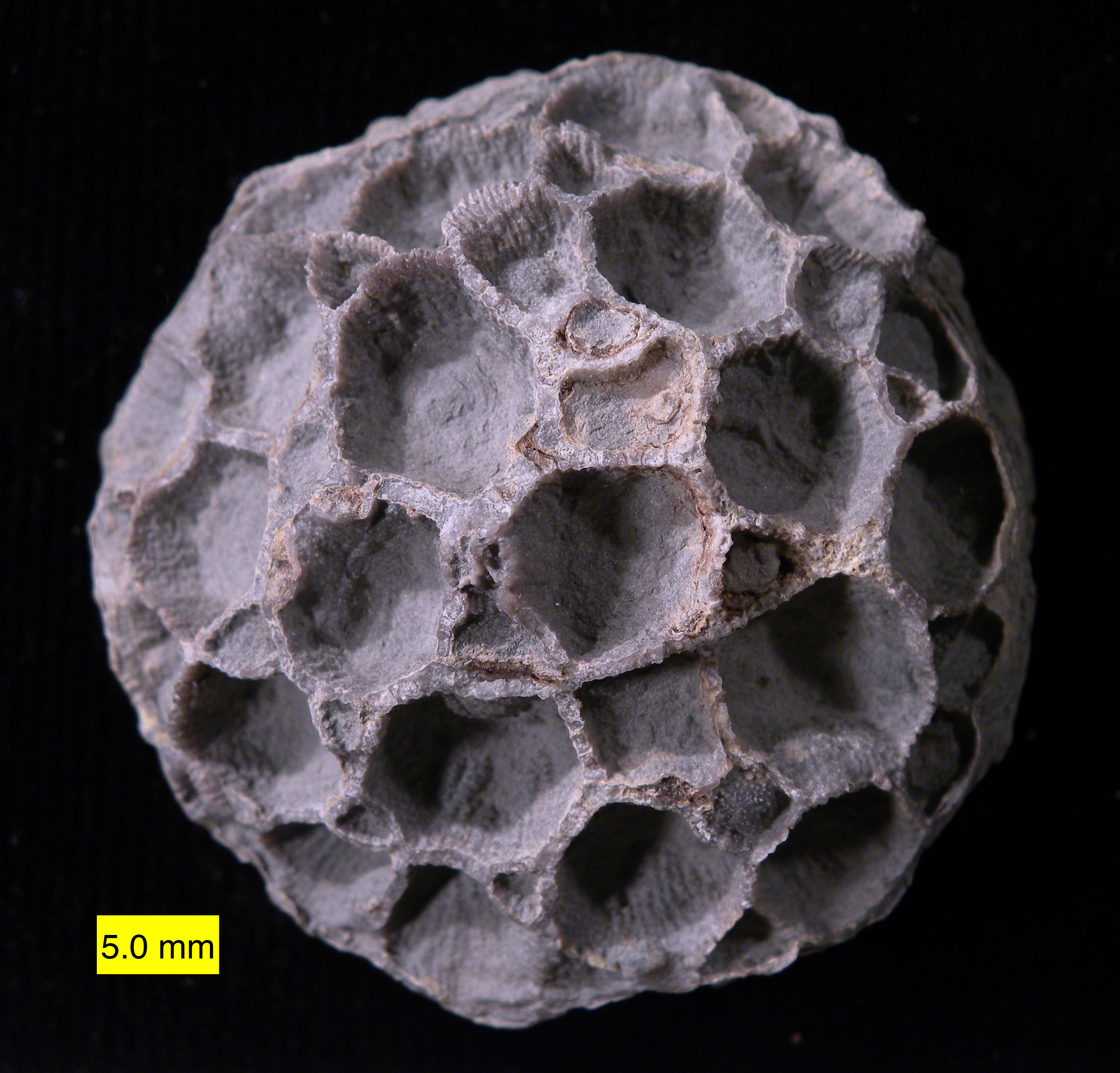
- Fossil of the Silurian-Carboniferous tabulate coral Pleurodictyum
  †Pleurodictyum
- †Sigillaria
  - †Sigillaria elegans
- †Solenopora
  - †Solenopora compacta
- †Sowerbyella
- †Sphenophyllum
  - †Sphenophyllum cuneifolium
- †Sphenopteris
  - †Sphenopteris elegans – or unidentified comparable form
  - †Sphenopteris pottsvillea
- †Spirifer
  - †Spirifer grimesi
- †Stigmaria
- †Strophomena
  - †Strophomena incurvata
  - †Strophomena planumbona
- †Subulites
- †Tetradium
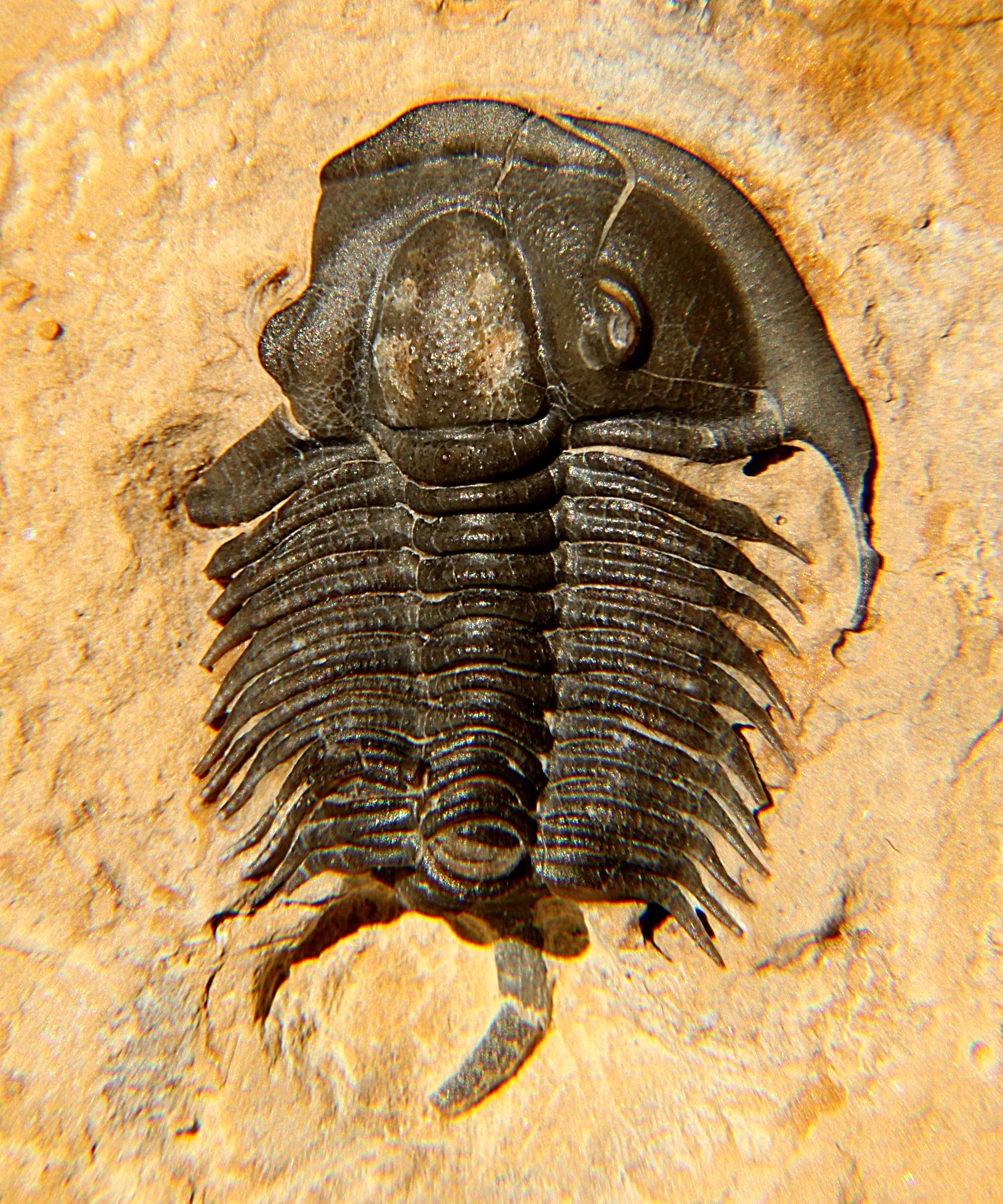
- Fossil of the Cambrian trilobite Tricrepicephalus
  †Tricrepicephalus
- †Valcouroceras

== Mesozoic ==
=== Selected Mesozoic taxa of Georgia ===
- Acirsa
- Acteon
- †Acteonella
- †Aenona
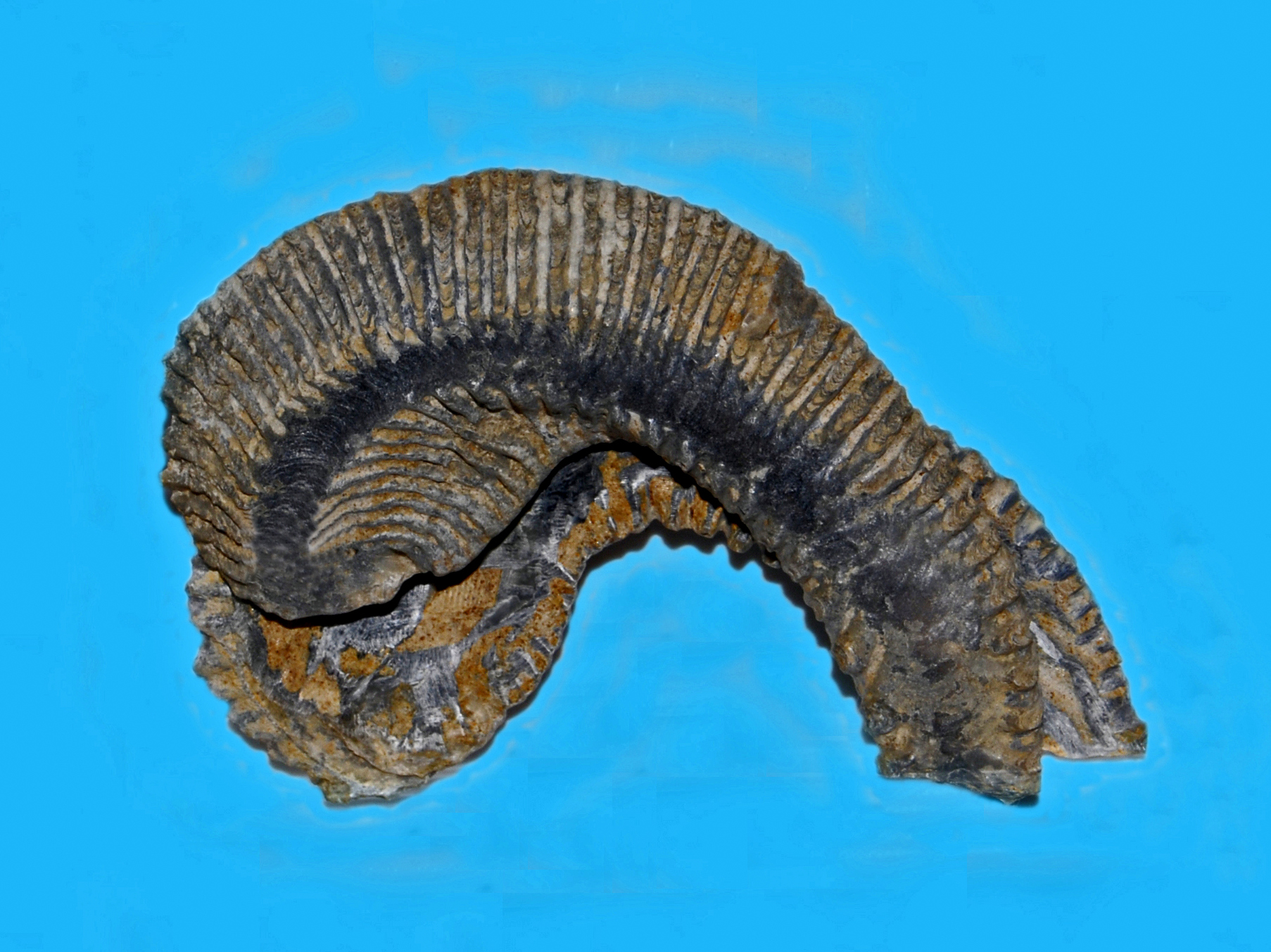
- Fossilized shell of the Late Cretaceous oyster Agerostrea
  †Agerostrea
- †Albertosaurus
- †Allonia – type locality for genus
- Amauropsis
- †Ancilla
- †Anomia
- †Anomoeodus
- †Arca
- Arrhoges
- Astarte
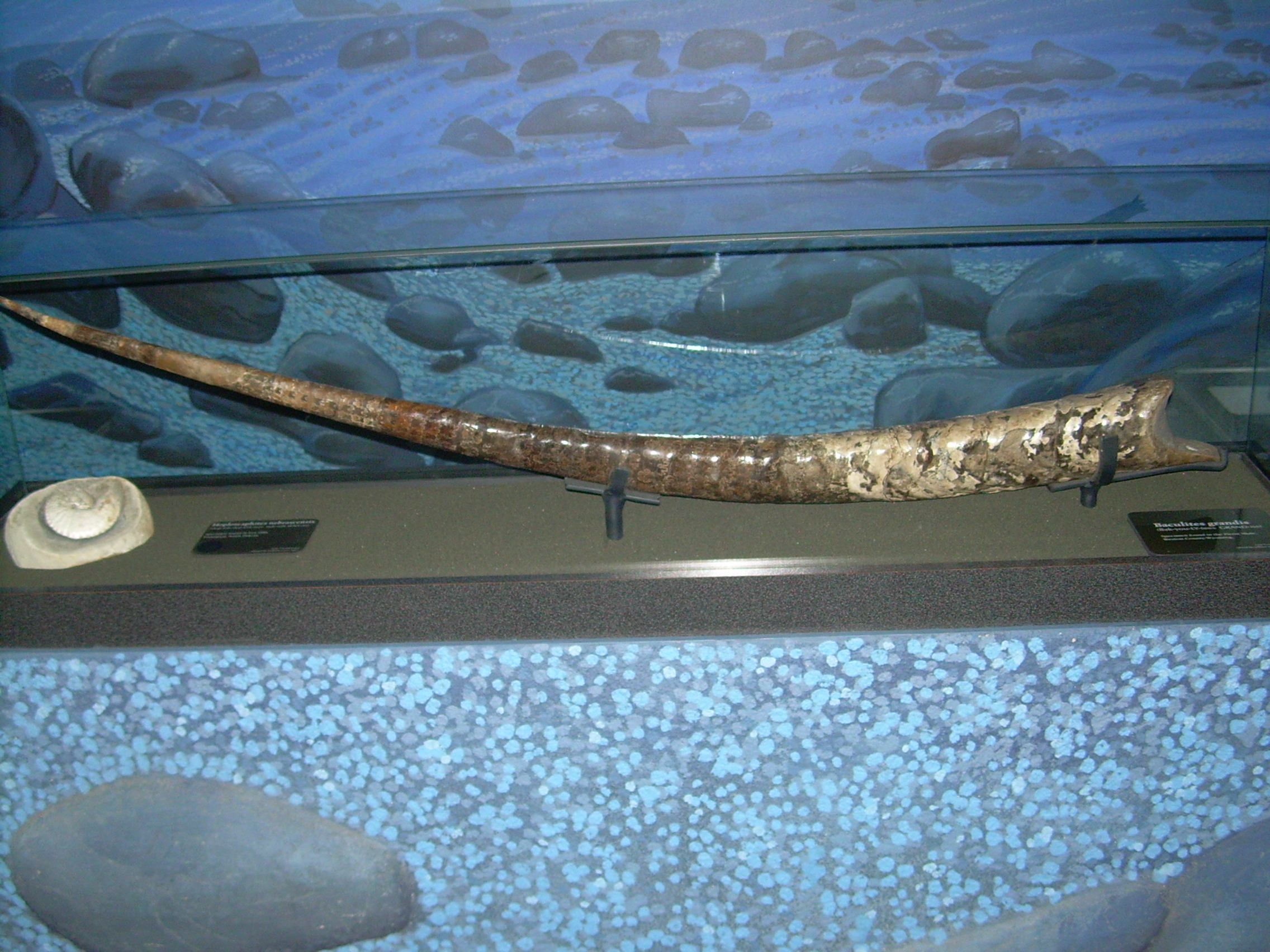
- Fossilized shell of the Late Cretaceous ammonoid cephalopod Baculites
  †Baculites
- †Bedellia – type locality for genus
- Botula
  - †Botula conchafodentis
  - †Botula ripleyana
- Brachidontes
- Cadulus
- Caestocorbula
  - †Caestocorbula crassaplica
  - †Caestocorbula crassiplica
  - †Caestocorbula percompressa
  - †Caestocorbula suffalciata
  - †Caestocorbula terramaria
- †Calliomphalus
  - †Calliomphalus americanus
  - †Calliomphalus nudus
- †Caveola
- Cerithiella
  - †Cerithiella nodoliratum – or unidentified related form
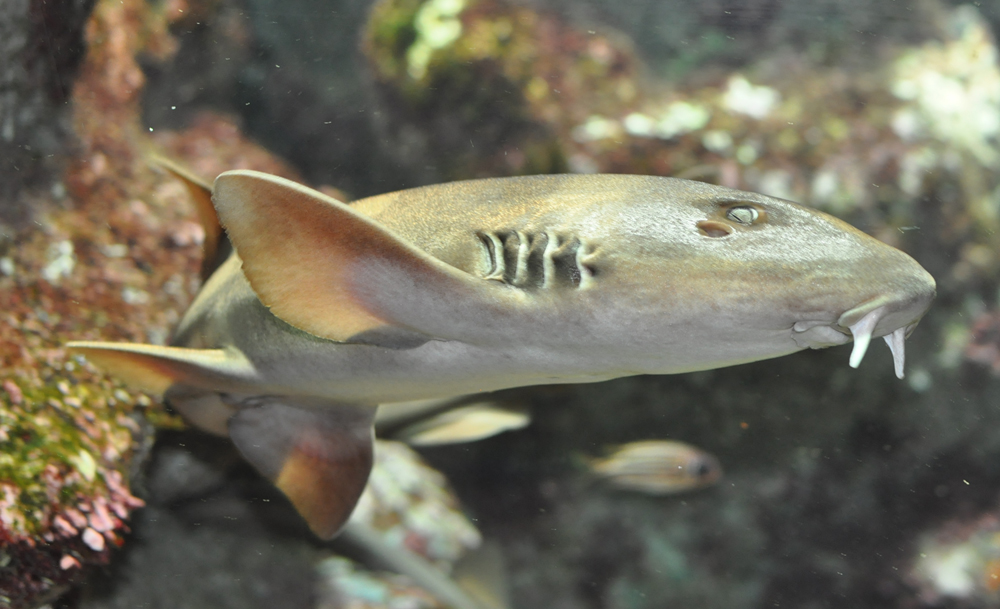
- A living Chiloscyllium longtail carpet shark
  Chiloscyllium
- Chiton
- Chlamys
- Cliona
- Corbula
- Crassostrea
- †Crenella
  - †Crenella elegantula
  - †Crenella serica
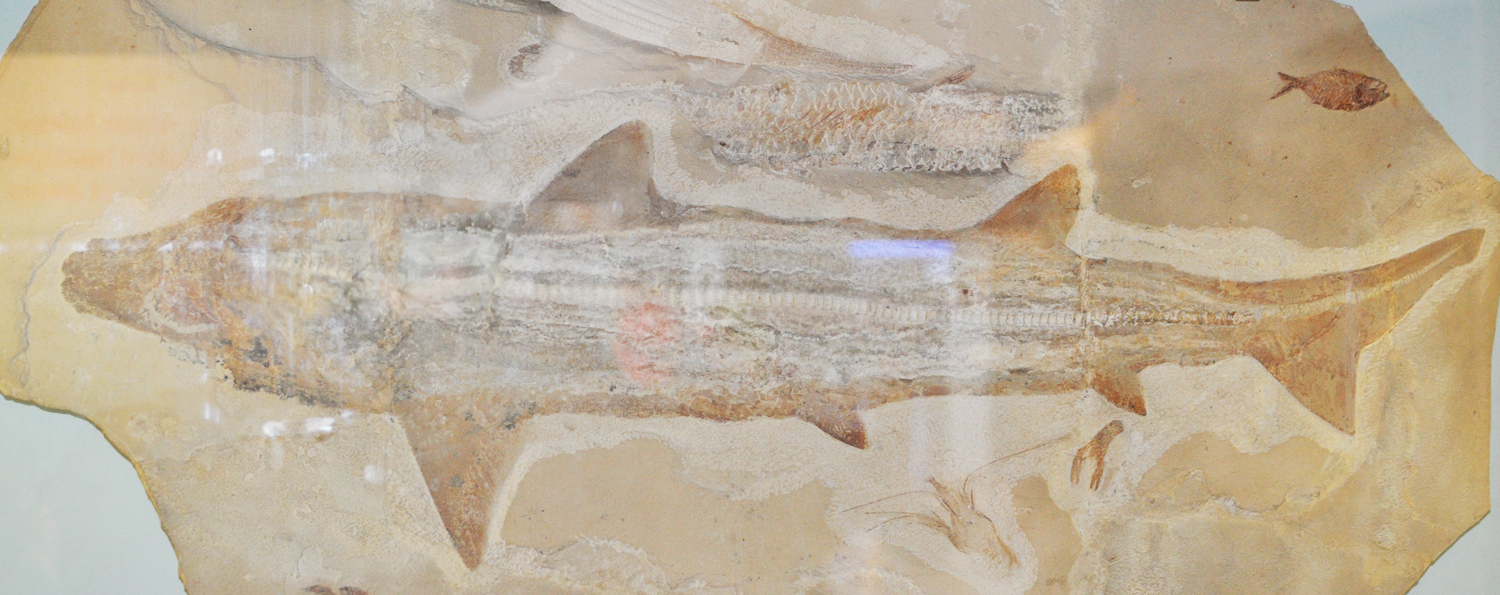
- Fossil of the Early Cretaceous-Eocene shark Cretolamna
  †Cretolamna
  - †Cretolamna appendiculata
- Cucullaea
  - †Cucullaea capax
  - †Cucullaea littlei
- Cuspidaria
  - †Cuspidaria grandis
- Cylichna
  - †Cylichna diversilirata
  - †Cylichna incisa
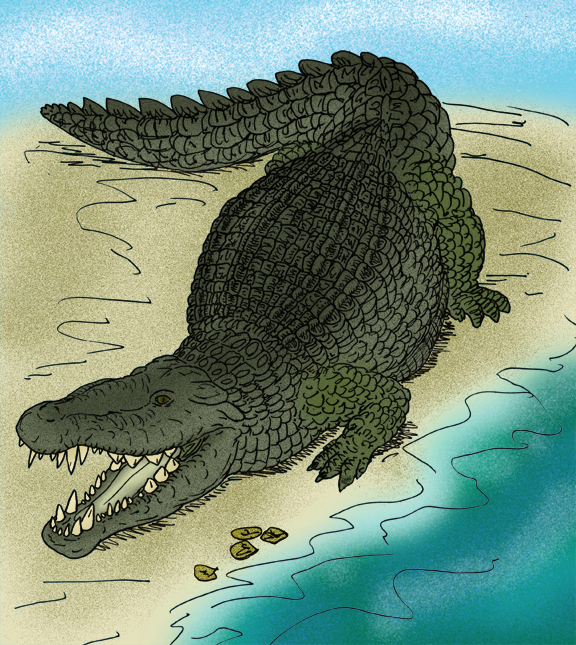
- Restoration of the Late Cretaceous Alligator relative Deinosuchus
  †Deinosuchus
  - †Deinosuchus rugosus
- Dentalium
  - †Dentalium leve
- †Dolicholatirus
- †Enchodus
  - †Enchodus petrosus
- †Eulima
  - †Eulima gracilistylis
  - †Eulima monmouthensis
- †Euspira
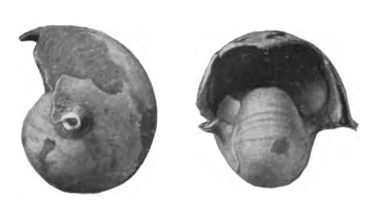
- Illustration in multiple views of a fossilized shell of the Late Jurassic-Miocene nautiloid cephalopod Eutrephoceras
  †Eutrephoceras
- †Exogyra
  - †Exogyra costata
  - †Exogyra ponderosa
  - †Exogyra upatoiensis
- Gemmula
- Ginglymostoma
- Glossus
- Glycymeris
  - †Glycymeris hamula
  - †Glycymeris rotundata
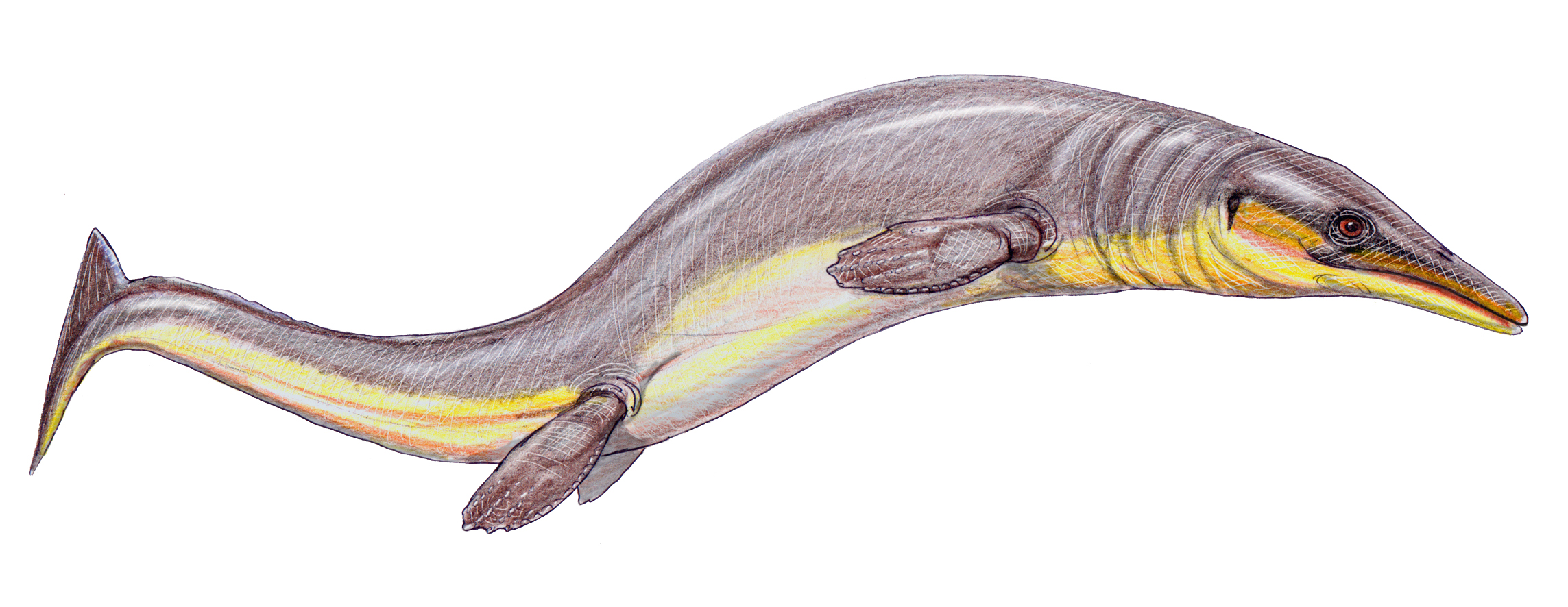
- Life restoration of the Late Cretaceous mosasaur Halisaurus
  †Halisaurus
- †Hamulus
- Heterodontus
- †Hybodus
- †Ischyrhiza
  - †Ischyrhiza mira
- Isognomon
- Lepisosteus
- Lima
- Limatula
- †Linearis
- †Linter
- †Lissodus
- Lithophaga
- Lopha
  - †Lopha falcata
  - †Lopha mesenterica
- †Mathilda
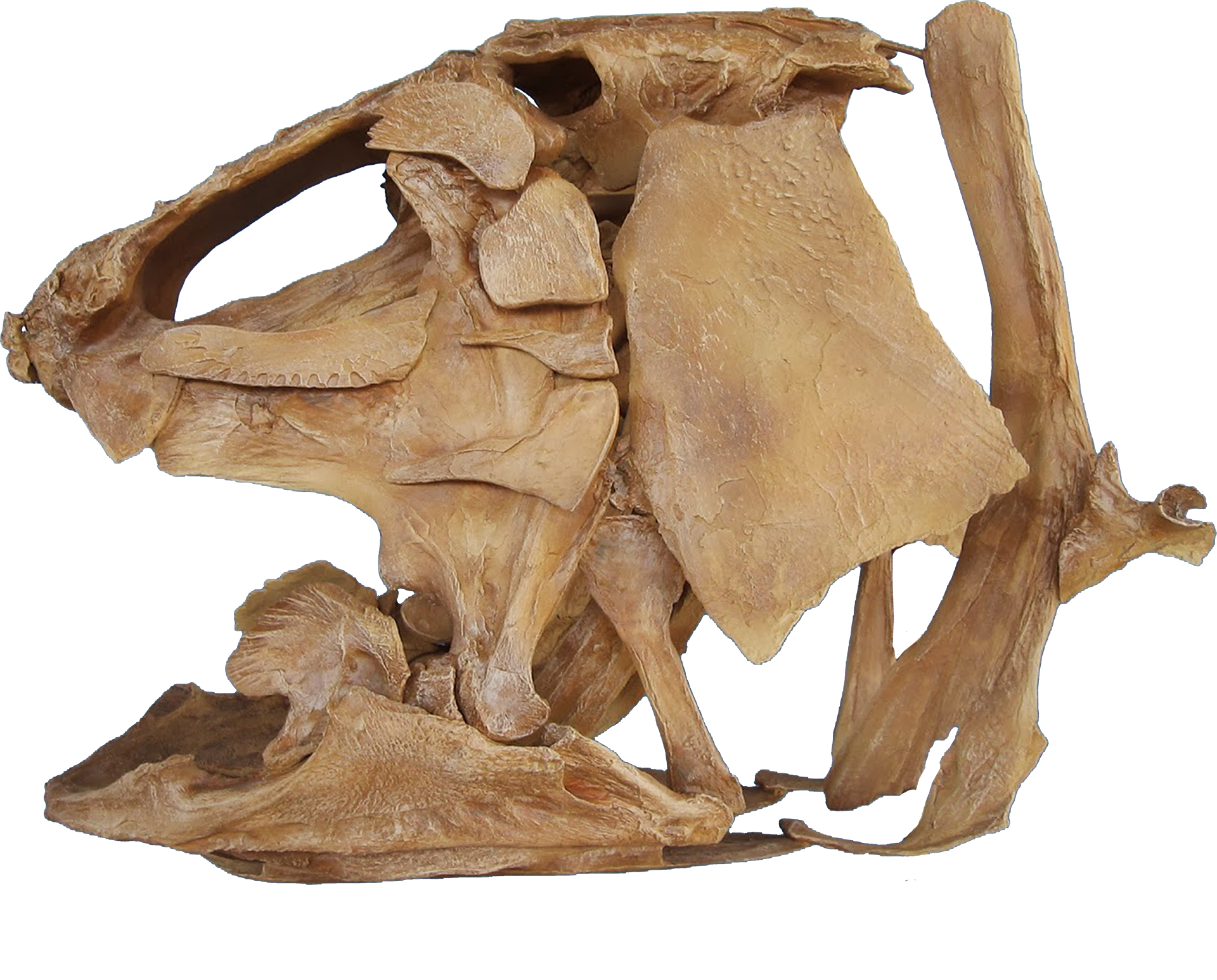
- Fossilized skull of the Late Cretceous coelacanth fish Megalocoelacanthus
  †Megalocoelacanthus
  - †Megalocoelacanthus dobiei
- †Modiolus
  - †Modiolus sedesclaris
  - †Modiolus sedesclarus
- †Morea
- Nerita
- Nozeba
- Nucula
  - †Nucula camia
  - †Nucula cuneifrons
  - †Nucula percrassa
  - †Nucula severnensis
- Ostrea
- Panopea
- †Paralbula
- † Paranomia
- Pholadomya
- †Pinna
- †Placenticeras
  - †Placenticeras benningi
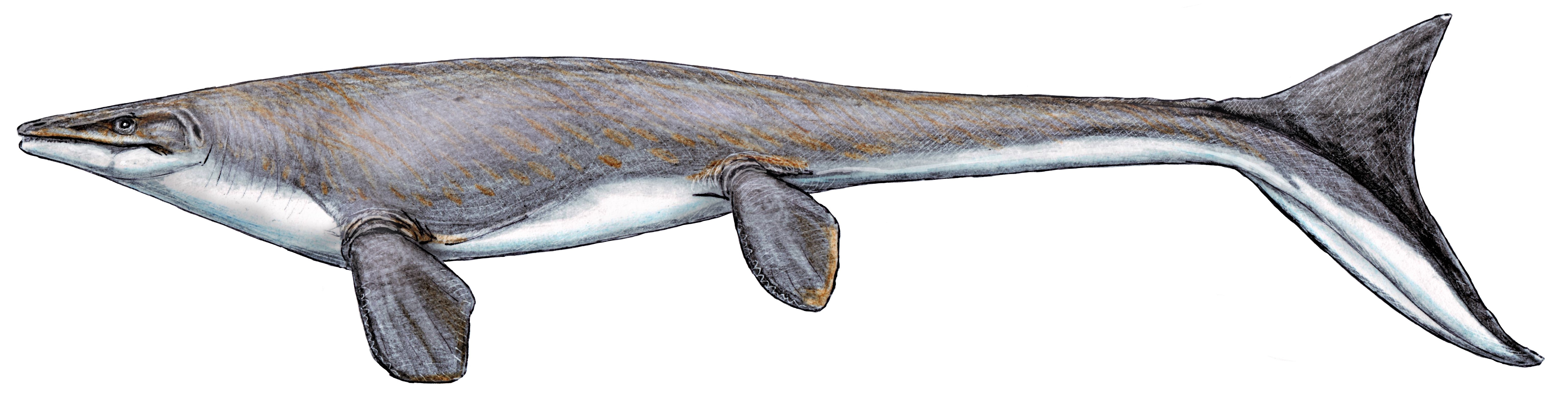
- Restoration of the Late Cretaceous mosasaur Platecarpus
  †Platecarpus
- Polinices
- †Prognathodon
- †Protocardia
- †Pseudocorax
  - †Pseudocorax affinis
- †Pteria
- †Pteridophyte
- †Pterotrigonia
  - †Pterotrigonia angulicostata
  - †Pterotrigonia cerulea
  - †Pterotrigonia eufalensis
  - †Pterotrigonia eufaulensis
- †Ptychodus
  - †Ptychodus mortoni
- †Ptychotrygon
  - †Ptychotrygon triangularis – or unidentified comparable form
- Pycnodonte
  - †Pycnodonte vesicularis
- †Regnellidium
- †Rhombodus
- Ringicula
  - †Ringicula clarki
- Rissoa
- †Scapanorhynchus
  - †Scapanorhynchus rhaphiodon
  - †Scapanorhynchus texanus
- Seila
- Serpula
- †Sphenodiscus
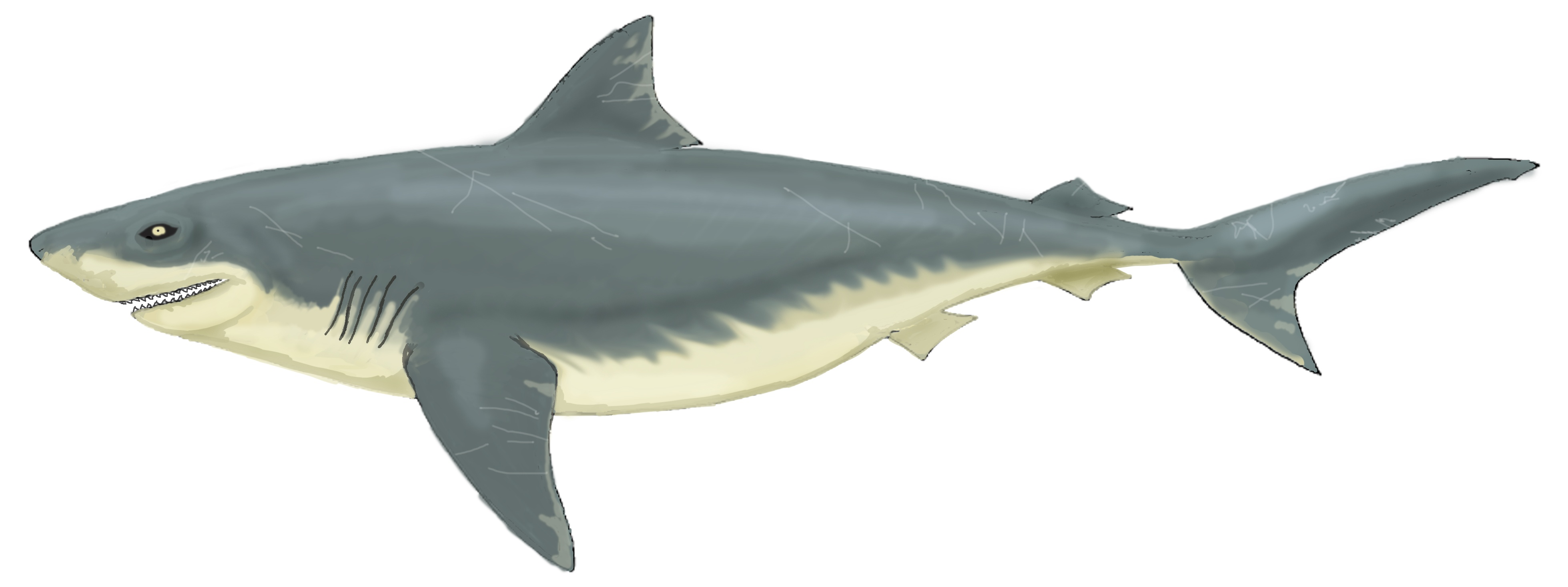
- Life restoration of the Late Cretaceous shark Squalicorax
  Squalicorax
  - †Squalicorax falcatus
  - †Squalicorax kaupi
- Squatina
- †Stephanodus
- Teinostoma
- Tellina
- †Tenea
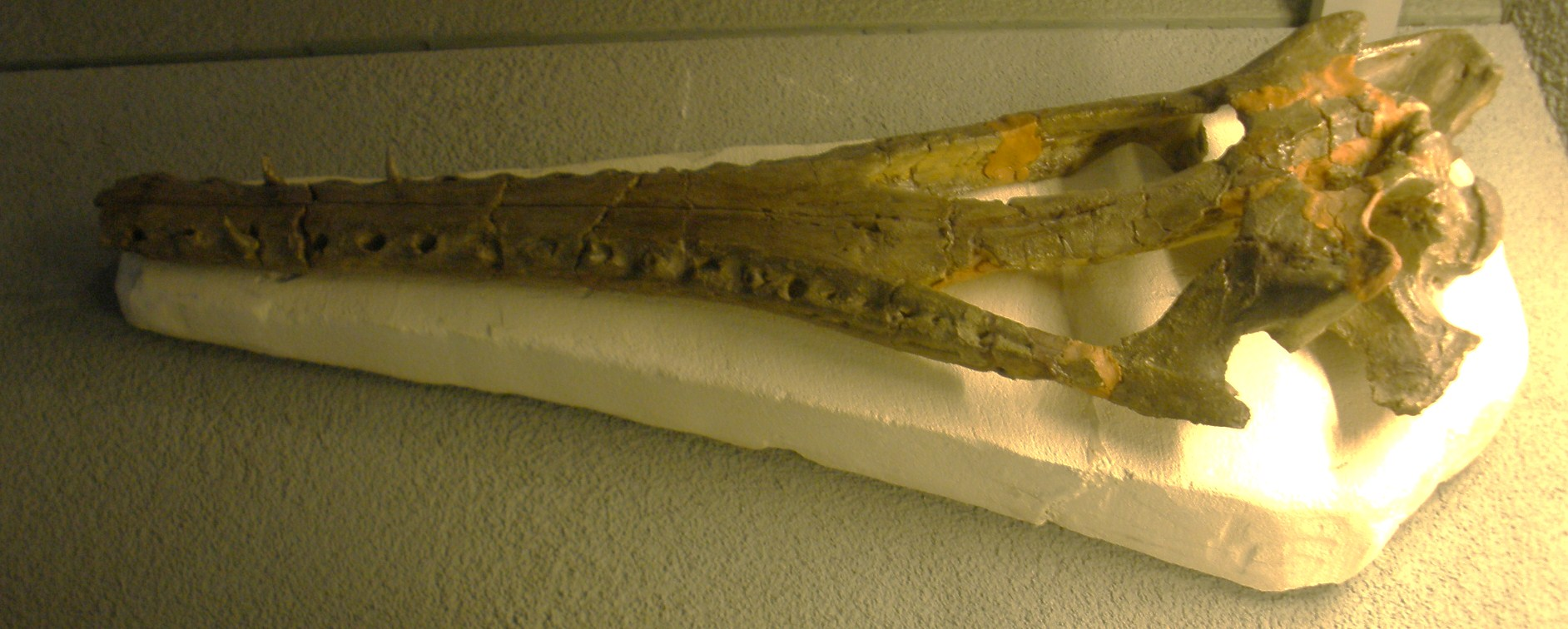
- Fossilized skull of the Late Cretaceous-Paleocene gavial relative Thoracosaurus
  †Thoracosaurus
- Trachycardium
  - †Trachycardium eufaulensis
- Turritella
  - †Turritella bilira
  - †Turritella hilgardi
  - †Turritella trilira
  - †Turritella vertebroides
- Xenophora
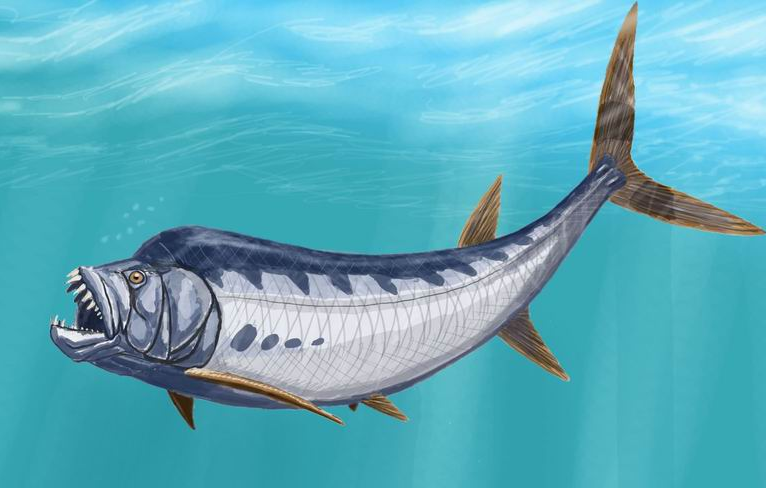
- Life restoration of the Cretaceous bony fish Xiphactinus
  †Xiphactinus
  - †Xiphactinus audax

== Cenozoic ==
=== Selected Cenozoic taxa of Georgia ===
- Abra
- Acanthocardia
- Acar
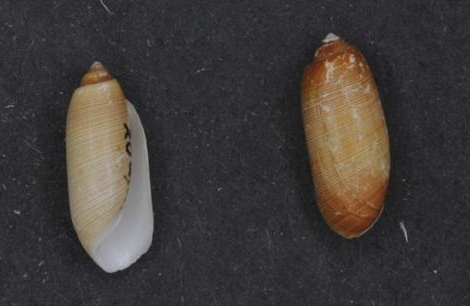
- Shells of Acteocina barrel-bubble sea snails
  Acteocina
- Aequipecten
- Aetobatus
  - †Aetobatus narinari
- Agassizia
- Agkistrodon
  - †Agkistrodon piscivorus
- Aix
  - †Aix sponsa
- Alligator
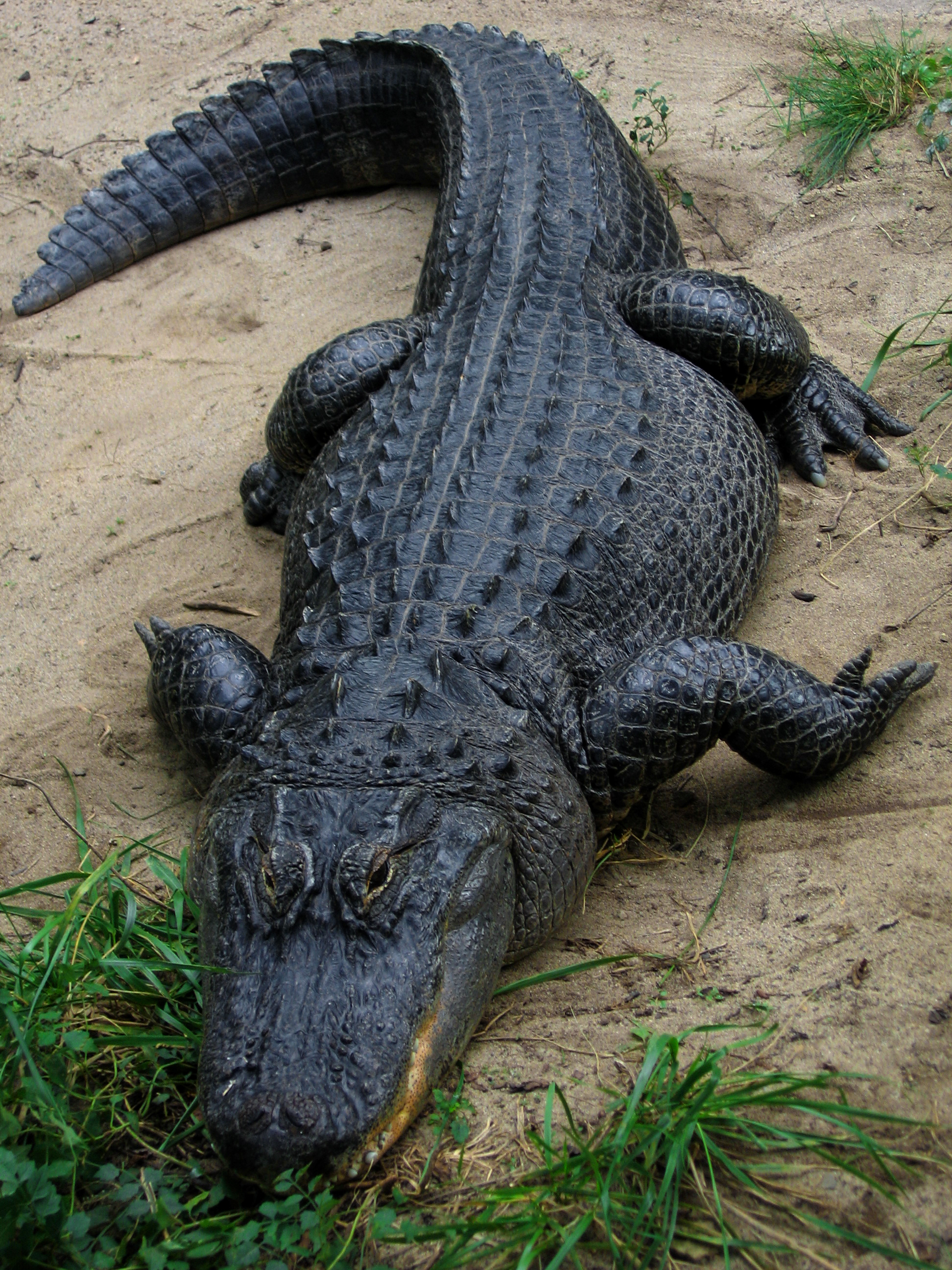
  - A living Alligator mississippiensis, or American alligator
    †Alligator mississippiensis
- Alosa – or unidentified comparable form
- Alveopora
- Amauropsis
- †Ambystoma
  - †Ambystoma maculatum – or unidentified comparable form
  - †Ambystoma tigrinum
- Amnicola
- Amphiuma
- †Ampullina
- †Ampullinopsis
- Amusium
- Anadara
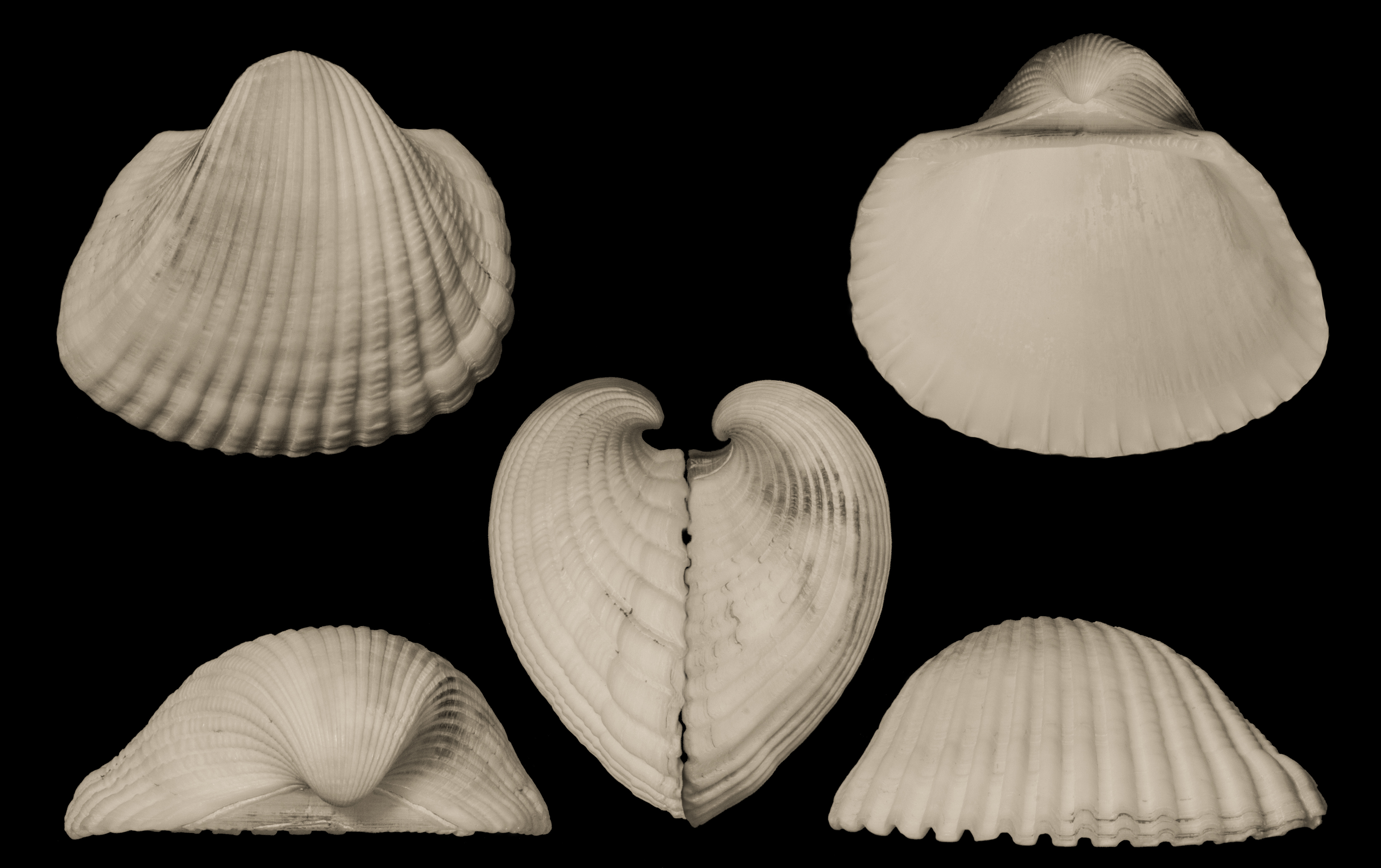
  - Shell in multiple views of an Anadara brasiliana, or incongruous ark clam
    †Anadara brasiliana
  - †Anadara ovalis
  - †Anadara transversa
- Anas
  - †Anas acuta
  - †Anas americana
  - †Anas crecca
  - †Anas discors
  - †Anas platyrhynchos – or unidentified comparable form
  - †Anas rubripes
  - †Anas strepera
- Anolis
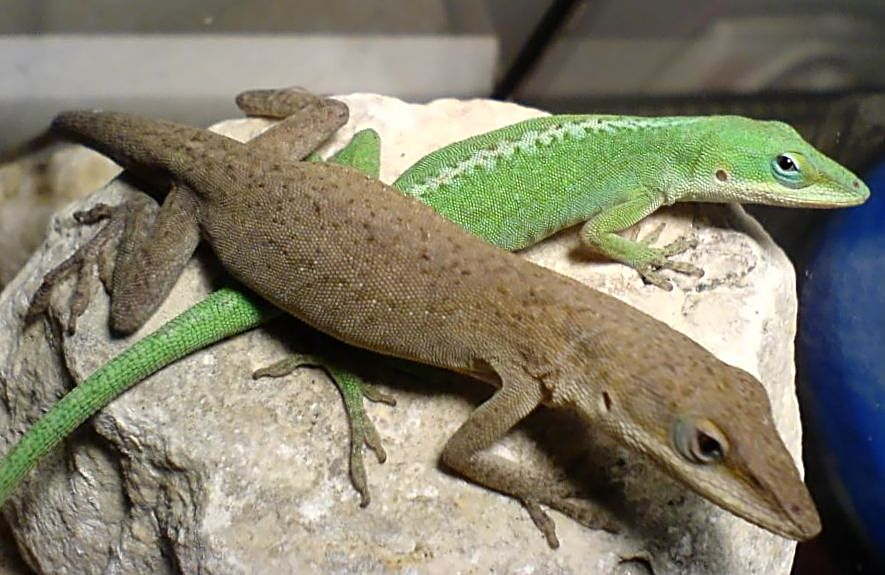
  - Living male (on top) and female (bottom, with white stripe down her back) Anolis carolinensis, or Carolina anoles
    †Anolis carolinensis
- Anomia
  - †Anomia simplex
- Apalone
  - †Apalone ferox
- Arca
- Architectonica
- †Archosargus
  - †Archosargus probatocephalus
- Arius
- Asio
- Astarte – report made of unidentified related form or using admittedly obsolete nomenclature
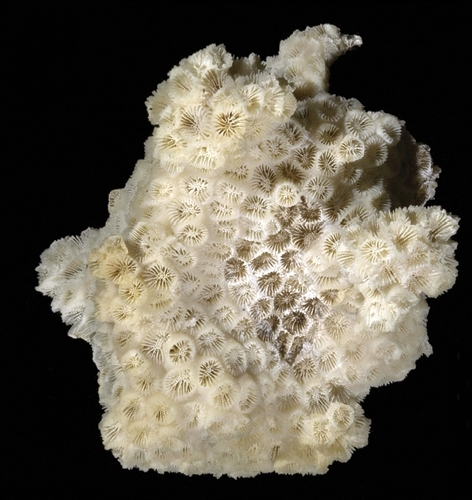
- An Astrangia stony coral
  Astrangia
  - †Astrangia danae
- Astreopora
- Athleta – or unidentified comparable form
- Atrina
- Aythya
  - †Aythya collaris
- Bairdiella
  - †Bairdiella chrysoura – or unidentified comparable form
- Balistes
- Barbatia
- Bartramia
  - †Bartramia longicauda
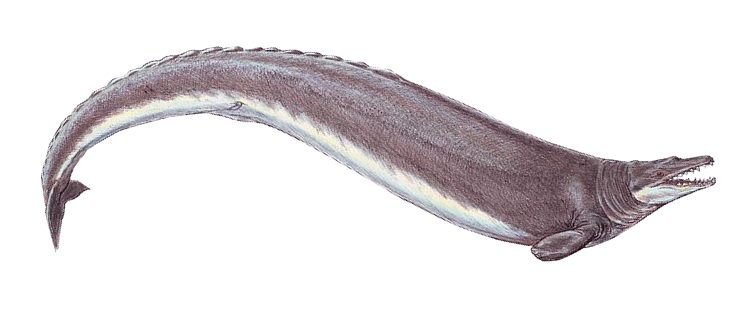
- Life restoration of the Eocene whale Basilosaurus
  †Basilosaurus
  - †Basilosaurus cetoides
- Bison
  - †Bison bison – tentative report
- Bittium
- Blarina
  - †Blarina brevicauda
  - †Blarina carolinensis
- Bonasa
  - †Bonasa umbellus
  - †Braarudosphaera bigelowii
- Bucephala
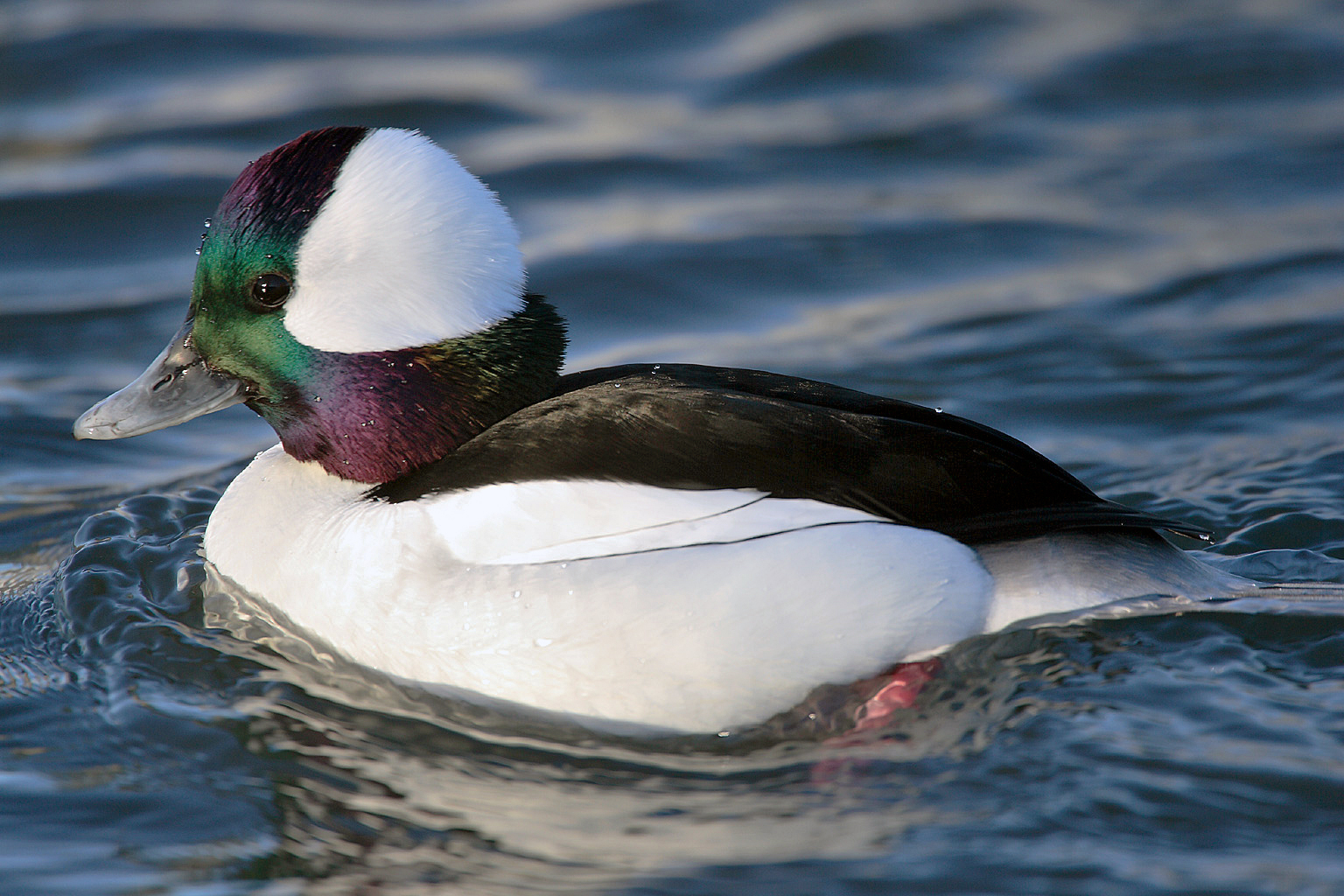
  - A living Bucephala albeola, or bufflehead
    †Bucephala albeola
- Bufo
  - †Bufo americanus
- †Burnhamia
- Bursa
- Busycon
  - †Busycon carica
- †Calippus
- Callista
- Calyptraea
  - †Calyptraea centralis
- Campanile
- Canis
  - †Canis lupus – or unidentified comparable form
- Carcharhinus
  - †Carcharhinus leucas
  - †Carcharhinus macloti – or unidentified comparable form
  - †Carcharhinus obscurus
- Carcharias
  - †Carcharias taurus
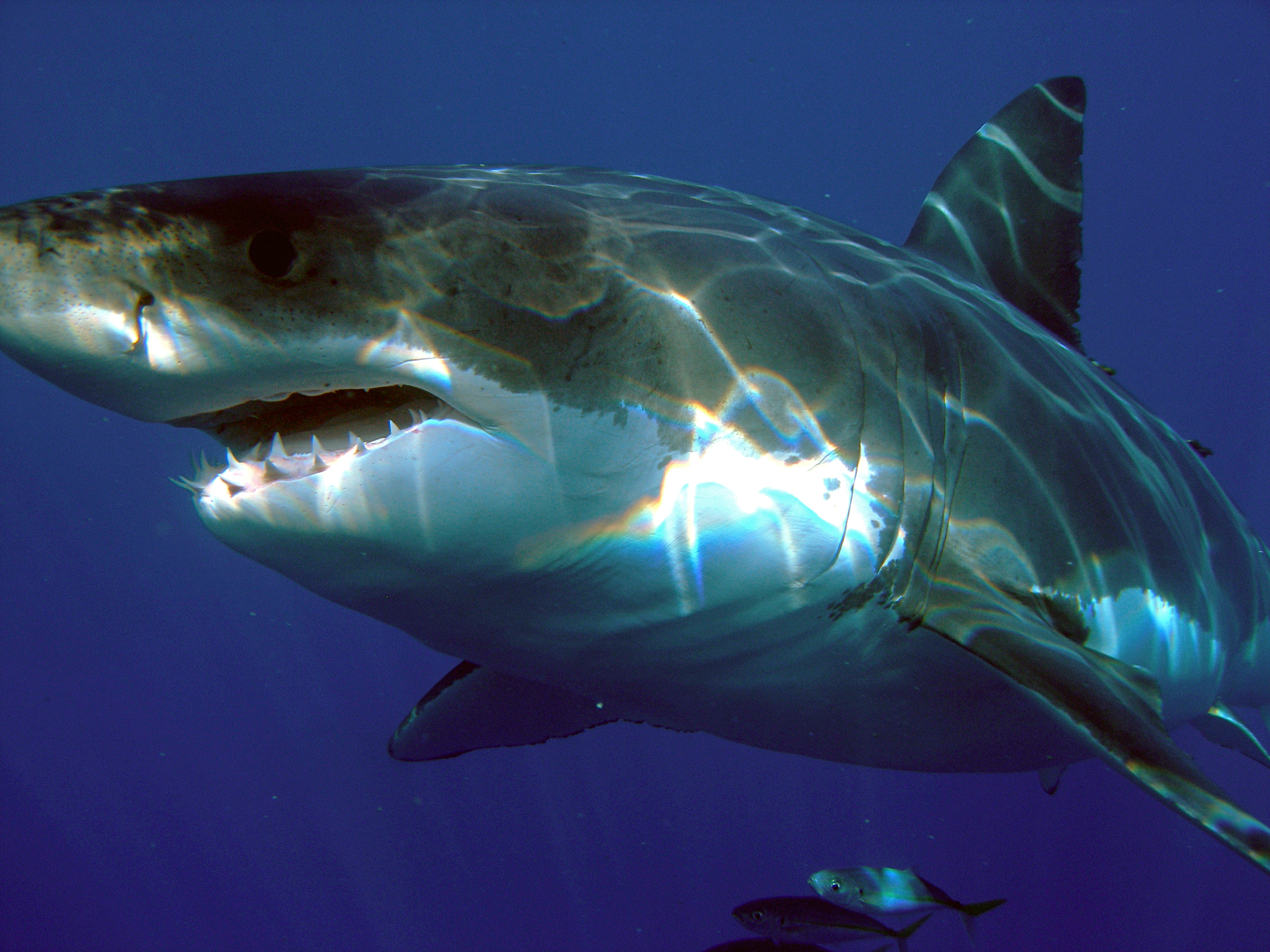
- A living Carcharodon shark
  Carcharodon
- Cardita
- Carditamera
- Carphophis
  - †Carphophis amoenus
- Carya
- Cassis
- Castor
  - †Castor canadensis
- †Castoroides
  - †Castoroides ohioensis
- Catoptrophorus – or unidentified comparable form
  - †Catoptrophorus semipalmatus
- Cerithiopsis
- Cerithium
  - †Cerithium georgianum
- Cervus
  - †Cervus elaphus
- Chama
- Chelydra
  - †Chelydra serpentina
- Chlamys
- Chlorostoma
- Clypeaster
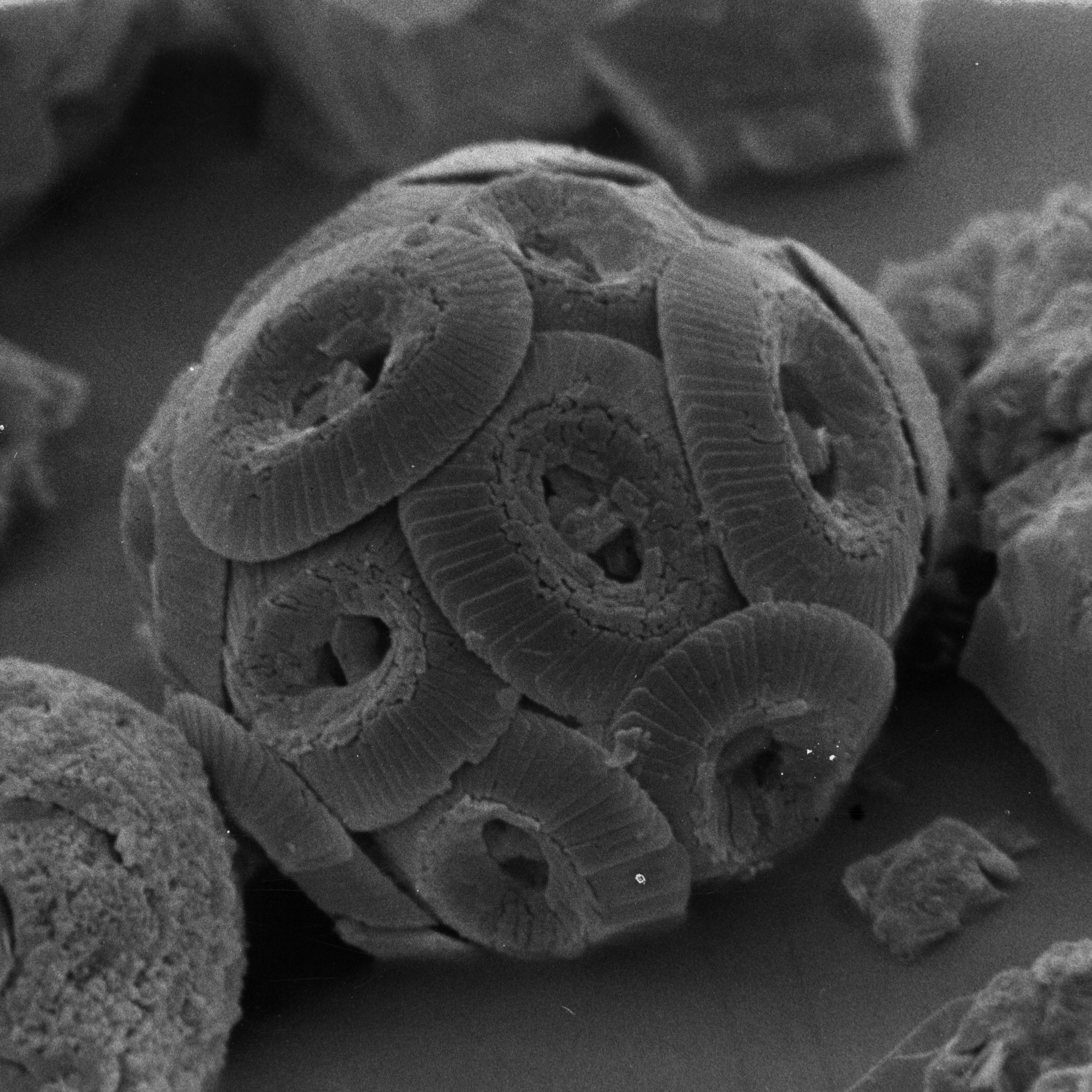
- Electron micrograph of a Coccolithus alga
  Coccolithus
- Colaptes
  - †Colaptes auratus
- Colinus
  - †Colinus virginianus
- Coluber
  - †Coluber constrictor
- Conepatus
  - †Conepatus leuconotus
- Conomitra
- Conus
- Coragyps
  - †Coragyps atratus
- Corbula
- Corvus
  - †Corvus brachyrhynchos
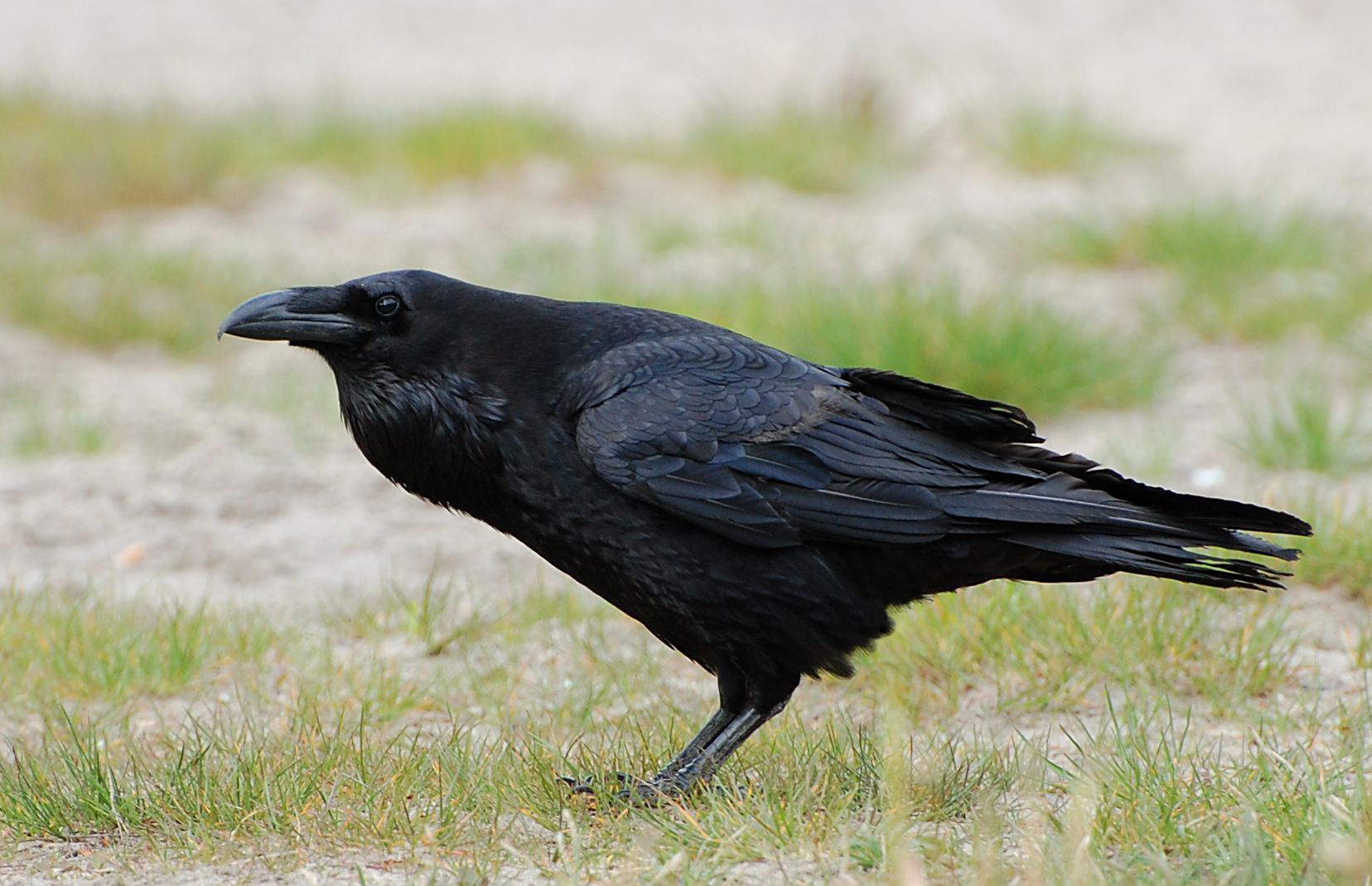
  - A living Corvus corax, or common raven
    †Corvus corax
- Crassostrea
  - †Crassostrea virginica
- Crepidula
  - †Crepidula fornicata
- Crocodylus
- Crotalus
  - †Crotalus horridus
- Crucibulum
- Cucullaea
- Cyanocitta
  - †Cyanocitta cristata
- Cygnus
  - †Cygnus columbianus
- †Cylindracanthus
- Cymatium
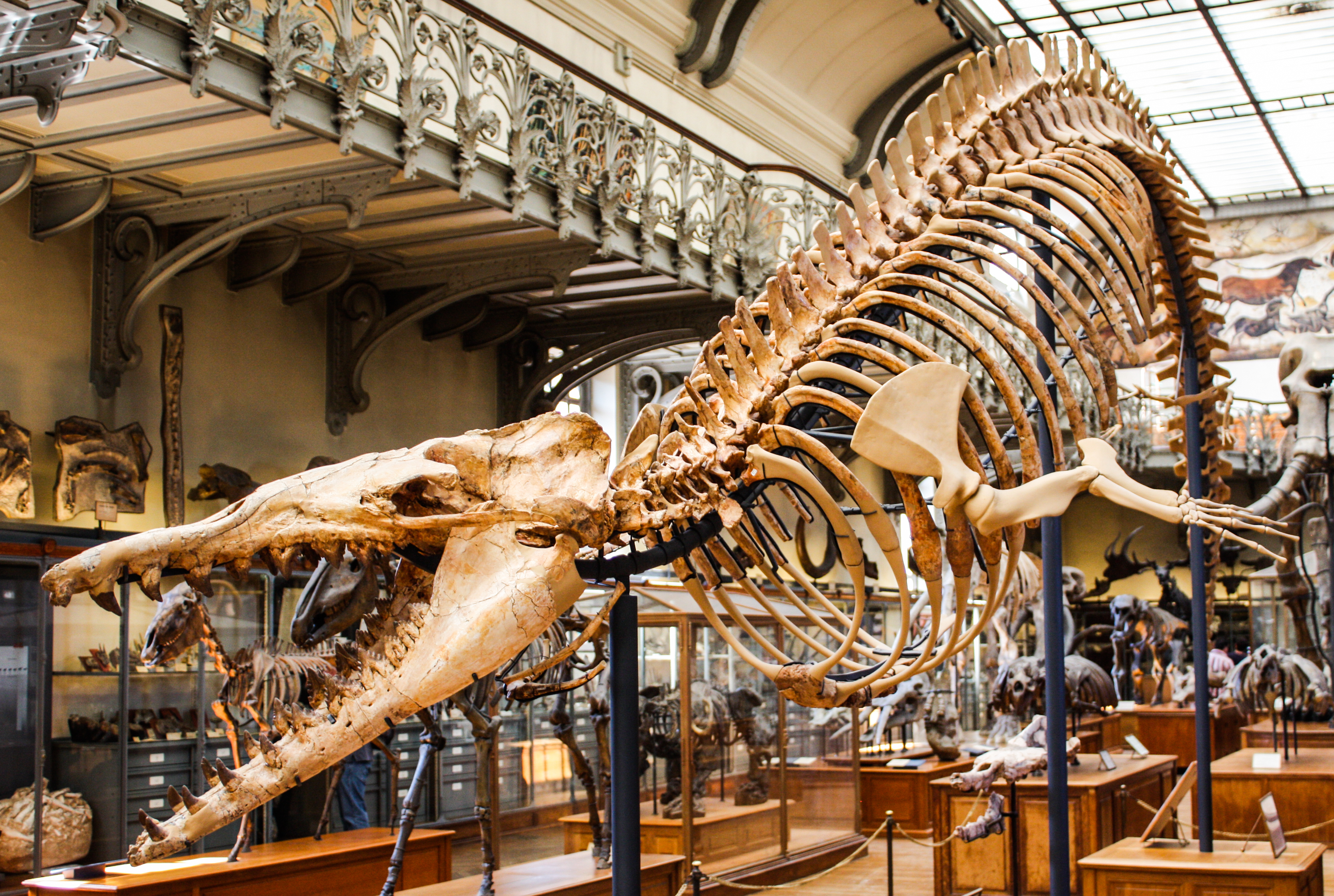
- Mounted fossilized skeleton of the Eocene whale Cynthiacetus
  †Cynthiacetus
- Cypraea
- Dasyatis
- Dasypus
  - †Dasypus bellus
- Deirochelys
  - †Deirochelys reticularia
- Dentalium
- Diadophis
  - †Diadophis punctatus
- Diastoma
- Didelphis
  - †Didelphis marsupialis
  - †Didelphis virginiana
- Diodora
- Diploastrea
- †Discoaster
- Donax
  - †Donax variabilis
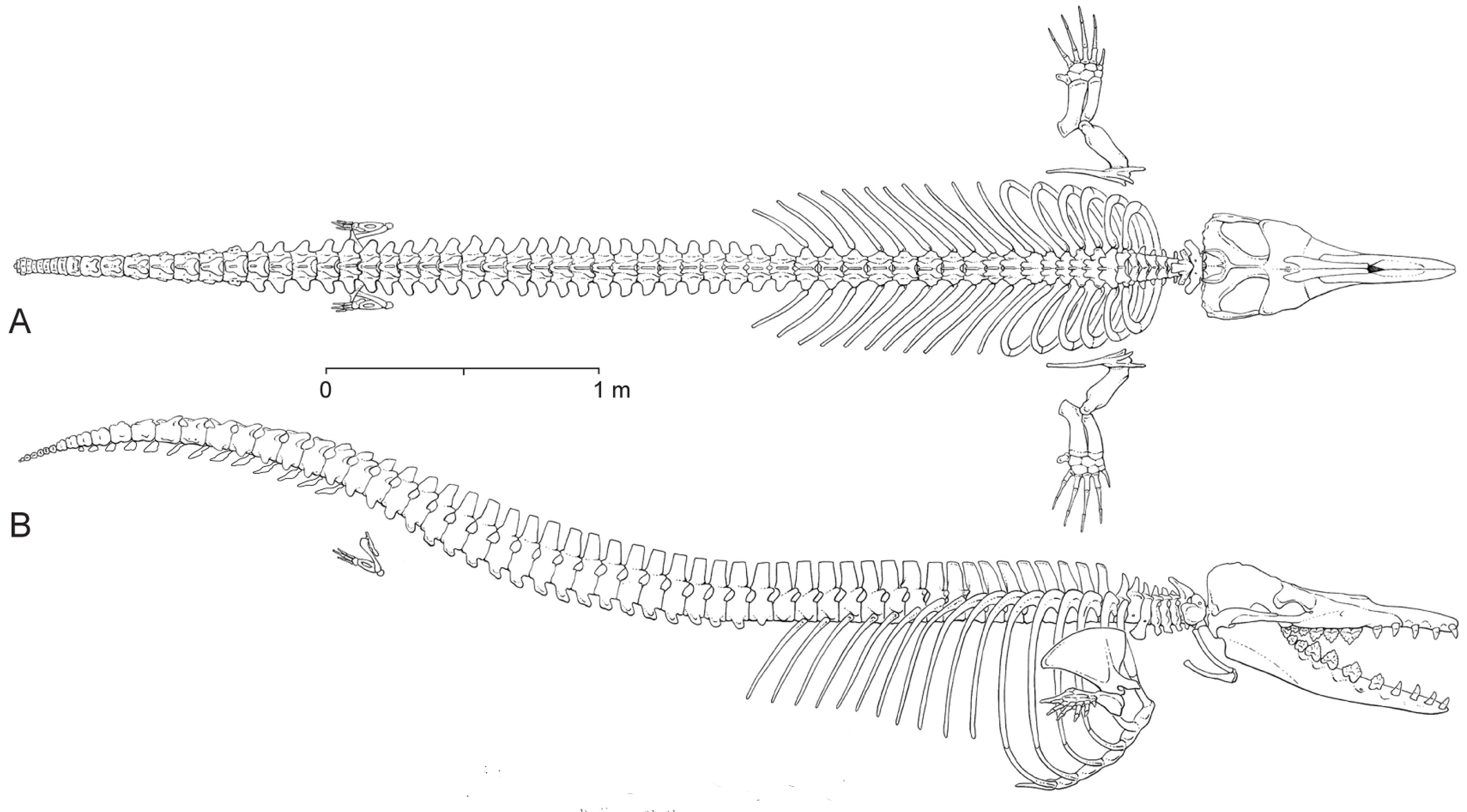
- Dorsal and right lateral views of reconstructed skeleton of Dorudon atrox
  †Dorudon
  - †Dorudon serratus
- Dosinia
- Dryocopus
  - †Dryocopus pileatus
- †Ectopistes
  - †Ectopistes migratorius
- Edaphodon
- Elops
  - †Elops saurus
- Epitonium
- Eptesicus
  - †Eptesicus fuscus – or unidentified comparable form
- Equus
  - †Equus simplicidens
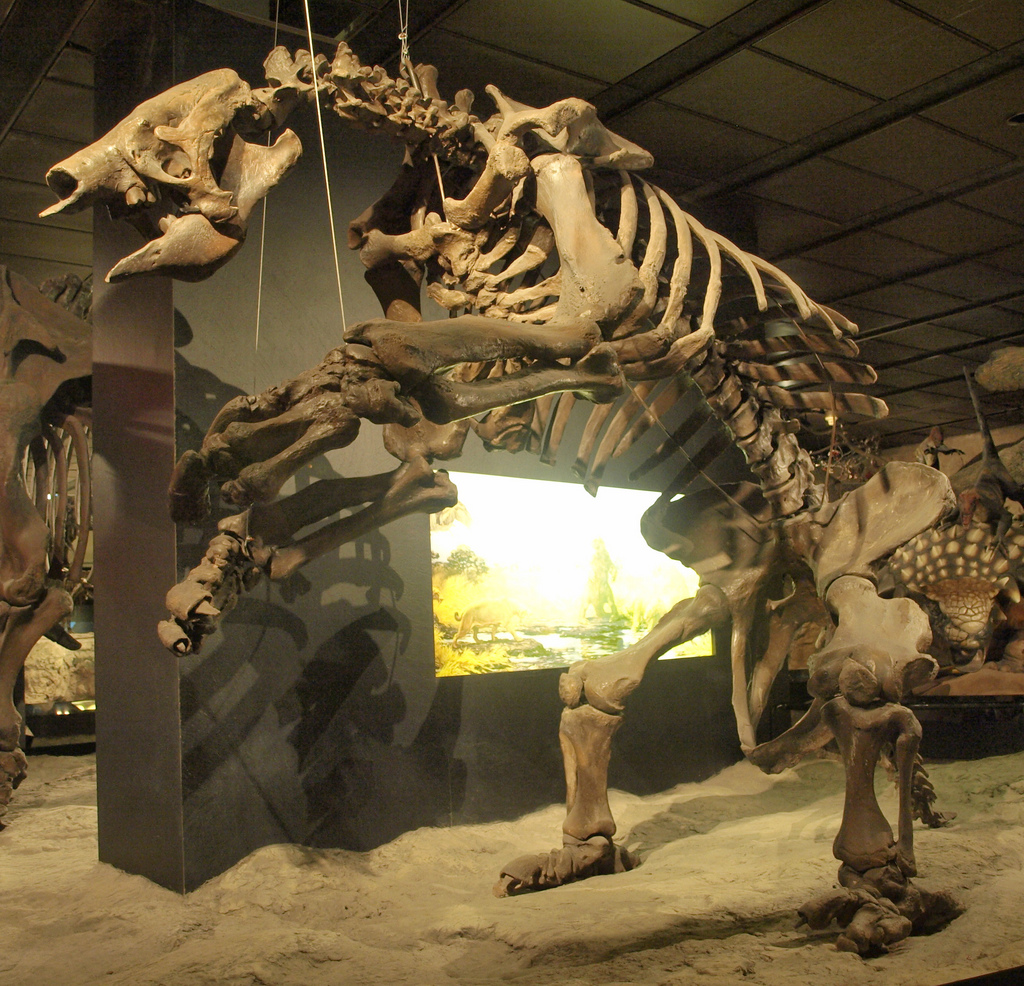
- Mounted fossilized skeleton of the Pliocene-Pleistocene ground sloth Eremotherium
  †Eremotherium
  - †Eremotherium laurillardi
- Eschrichtius
  - †Eschrichtius robustus
- †Eucastor
- Eupleura
  - †Eupleura caudata
- Falco
  - †Falco sparverius
- Favites
- Felis
- †Fundulus
- Fusinus
- Galeocerdo
  - †Galeocerdo cuvier
- Galeorhinus
  - †Galeorhinus galeus
- Gari
- Gastrochaena
- Gemma
  - †Gemma purpurea
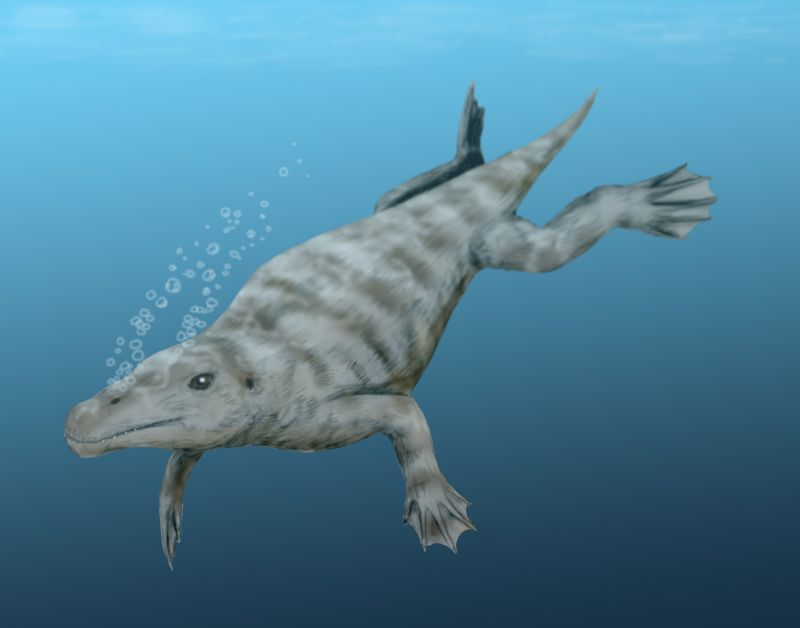
- Life restoration of the Eocene whale Georgiacetus
  †Georgiacetus – type locality for genus
  - †Georgiacetus vogtlensis – type locality for species
- Ginglymostoma
  - †Ginglymostoma cirratum
- Glycymeris
- Glyptemys
  - †Glyptemys insculpta
- Goniopora
- Gopherus
  - †Gopherus polyphemus
- Haustator
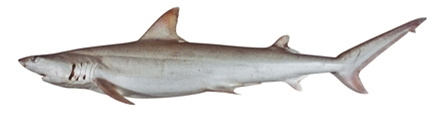
- A living Hemipristis weasel shark
  Hemipristis
  - †Hemipristis curvatus
- Hesperisternia
- †Hesperotestudo
- Heterodon
  - †Heterodon platyrhinos
- Heterodontus
- Hexaplex
  - †Hexaplex fulvescens
- †Hippotherium
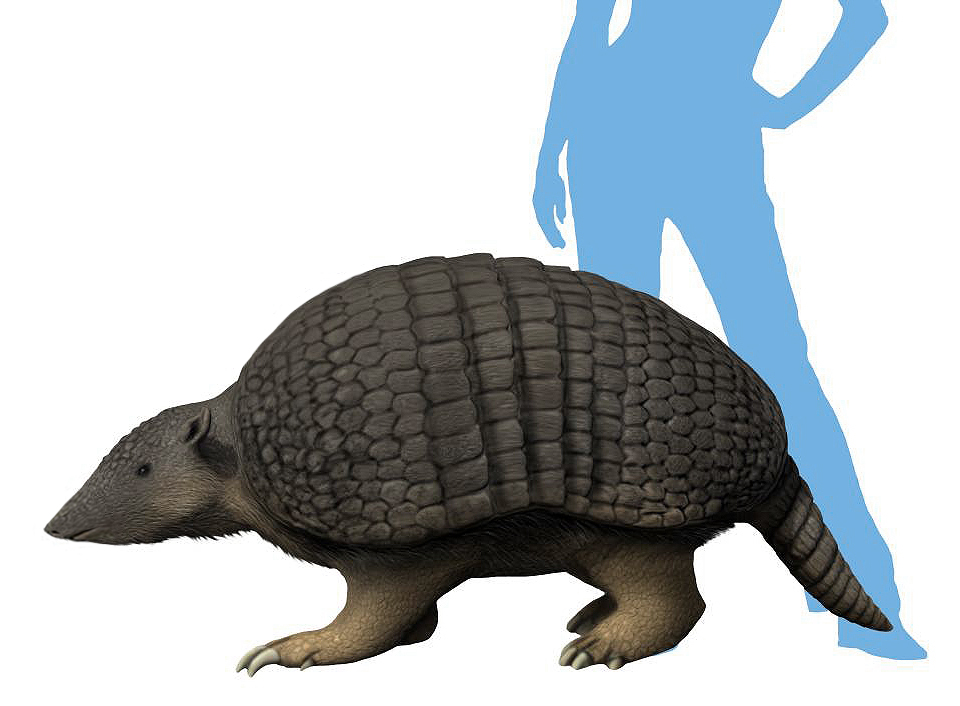
- Life restoration of the Pleistocene armadillo relative Holmesina with a human to scale
  †Holmesina
- Hyla
  - †Hyla crucifer
- Isurus
  - †Isurus oxyrinchus
- Kinosternon
- †Lactophrys
- Laevicardium
- †Lagodon
  - †Lagodon rhomboides
- Lamna
- Lampropeltis
  - †Lampropeltis getulus
  - †Lampropeltis triangulum
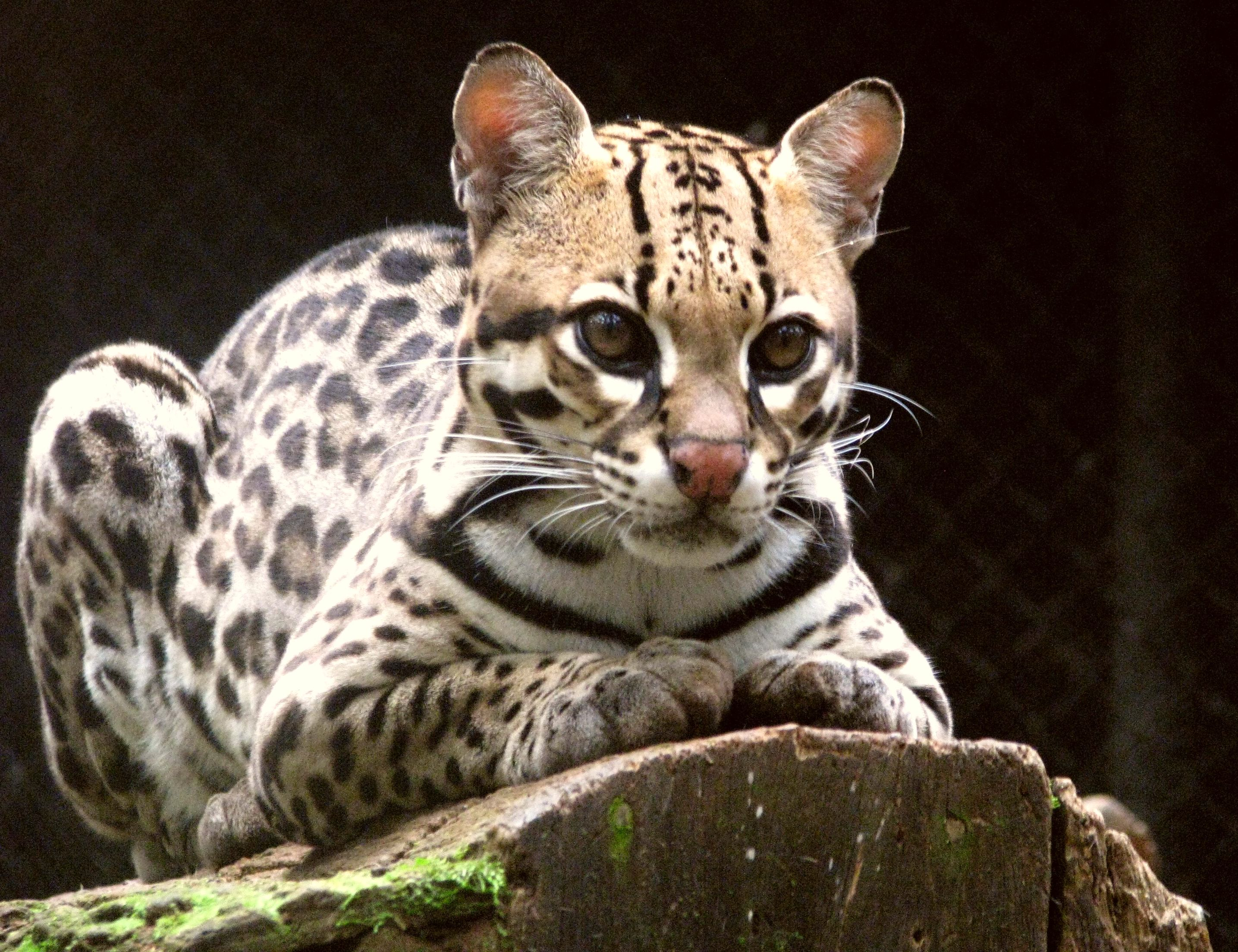
- A living Leopardus
  Leopardus
- Lepisosteus
- †Leptotragulus
- Lima
- †Linthia
- Liotia
- Liquidambar
- Lithophaga
- Littoraria
  - †Littoraria irrorata
- Lontra
  - †Lontra canadensis
- Lopha
- Lophelia
- Lophodytes
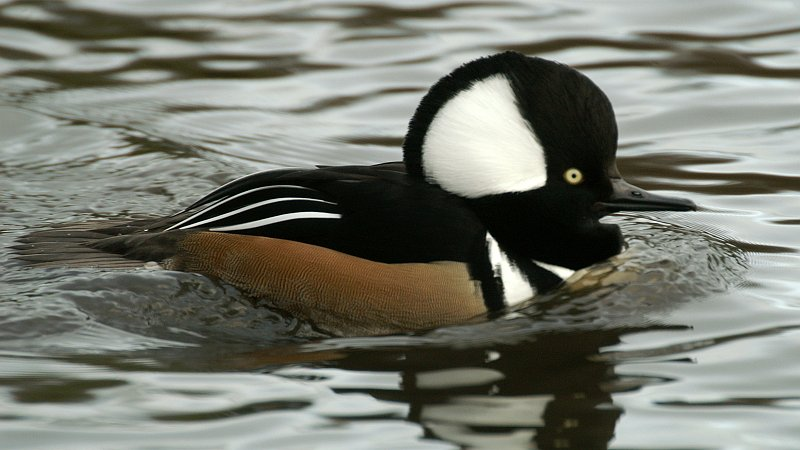
  - A living Lophodytes cucullatus, or hooded merganser
    †Lophodytes cucullatus
- Lucina
- Lynx
  - †Lynx rufus
- Lyria
- Macrocallista
- Mactra
- Malaclemys
  - †Malaclemys terrapin
- †Mammut
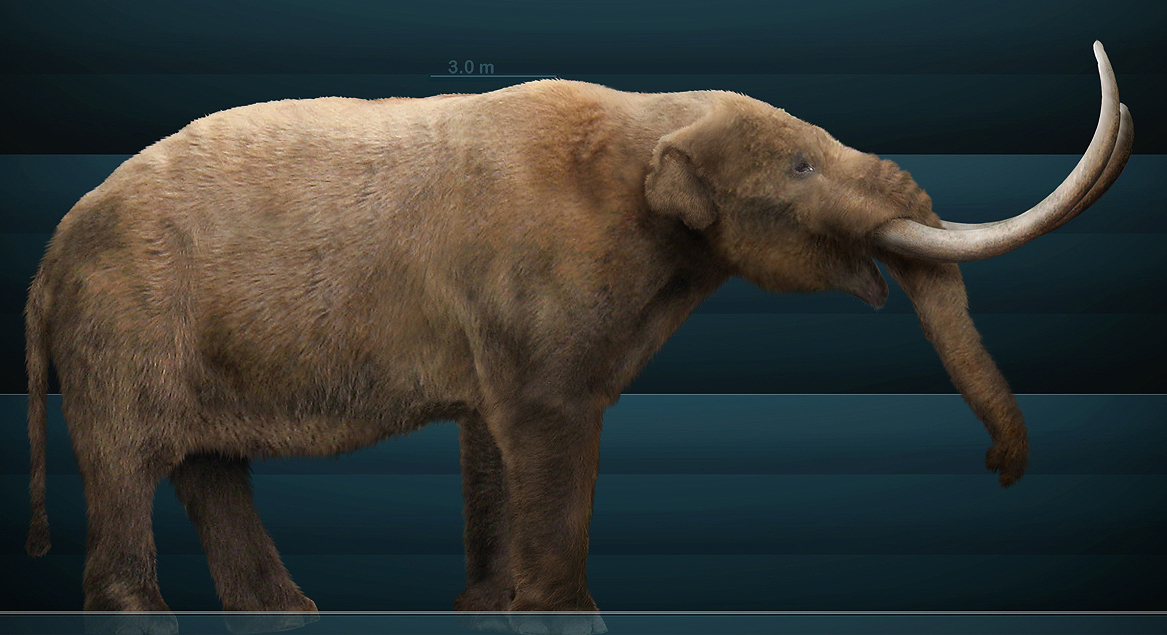
  - Restoration of a Mammut americanum, or American mastodon
    †Mammut americanum
- †Mammuthus
  - †Mammuthus columbi
- Margarites
- Marginella
- Marmota
  - †Marmota monax
- †Megalonyx
- †Megatherium
  - †Megatherium americanum
- Melanerpes
- Meleagris
  - †Meleagris gallopavo
- Melongena
  - †Melongena corona
- Mephitis
  - †Mephitis mephitis
- Mercenaria
  - †Mercenaria mercenaria
- Meretrix
- Mesalia
- Microtus
  - †Microtus pennsylvanicus
  - †Microtus pinetorum
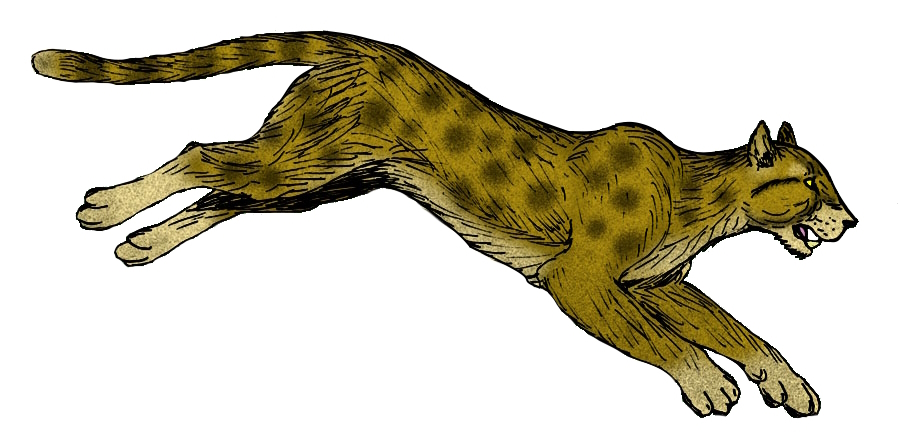
- Restoration of the Pliocene-Pleistocene Miracinonyx, or American cheetah
  †Miracinonyx
  - †Miracinonyx inexpectatus – or unidentified comparable form
- Mitra
- Modiolus
- †Monosaulax – or unidentified comparable form
- Mugil
- Mulinia
  - †Mulinia lateralis
- Mustela
  - †Mustela frenata – or unidentified comparable form
- Myliobatis
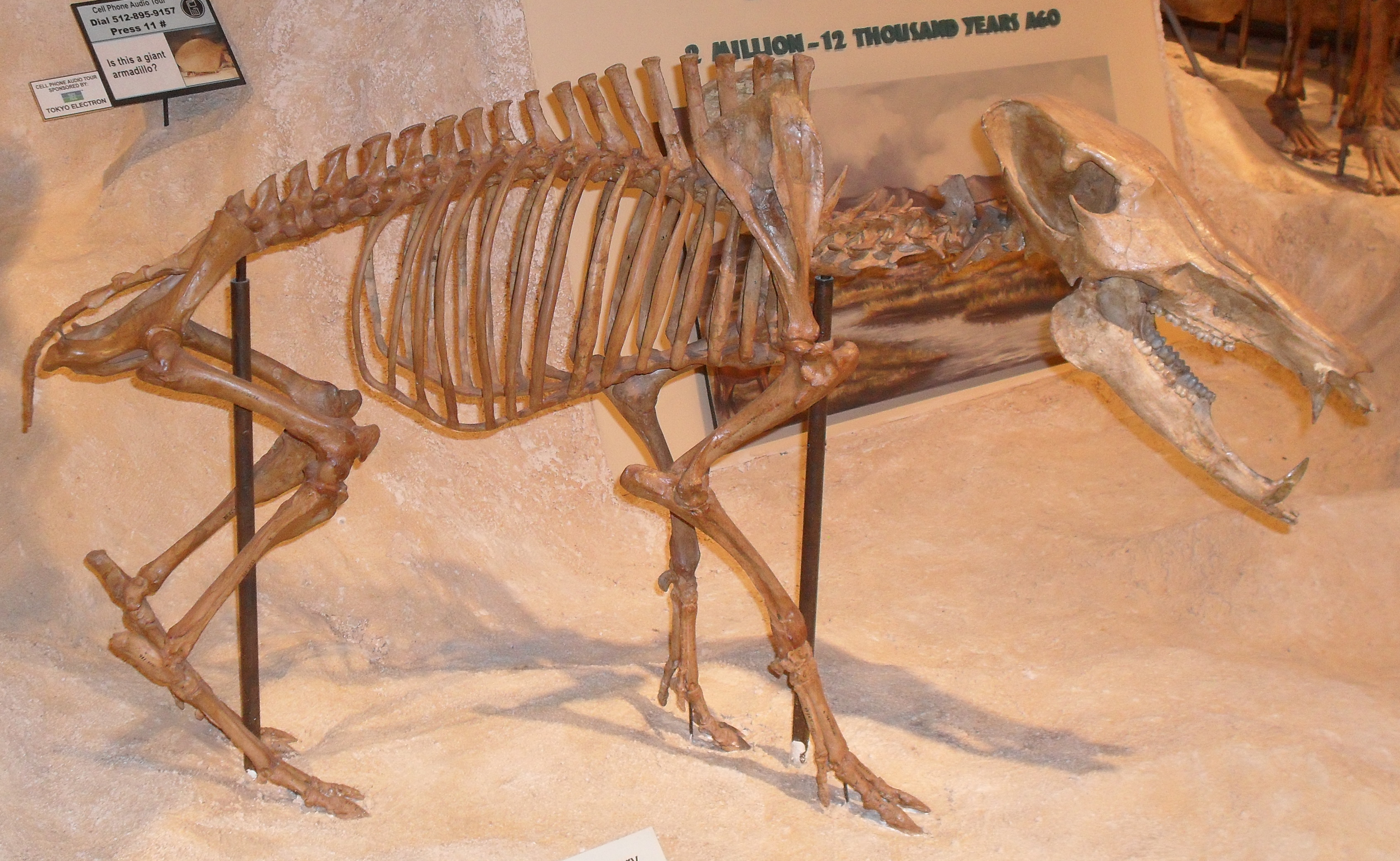
- Fossilized skeleton of the Pliocene-Holocene peccary Mylohyus
  †Mylohyus
  - †Mylohyus fossilis
- Myotis
  - †Myotis grisescens – or unidentified comparable form
  - †Myotis lucifugus – or unidentified comparable form
- Nassarius
  - †Nassarius acutus
- Natica
- Nebrius
- Negaprion
  - †Negaprion brevirostris
  - †Negaprion eurybathrodon
- †Neochoerus
  - †Neochoerus aesopi
  - †Neochoerus pinckneyi – or unidentified comparable form
- Neofiber
  - †Neofiber alleni
- Neomonachus
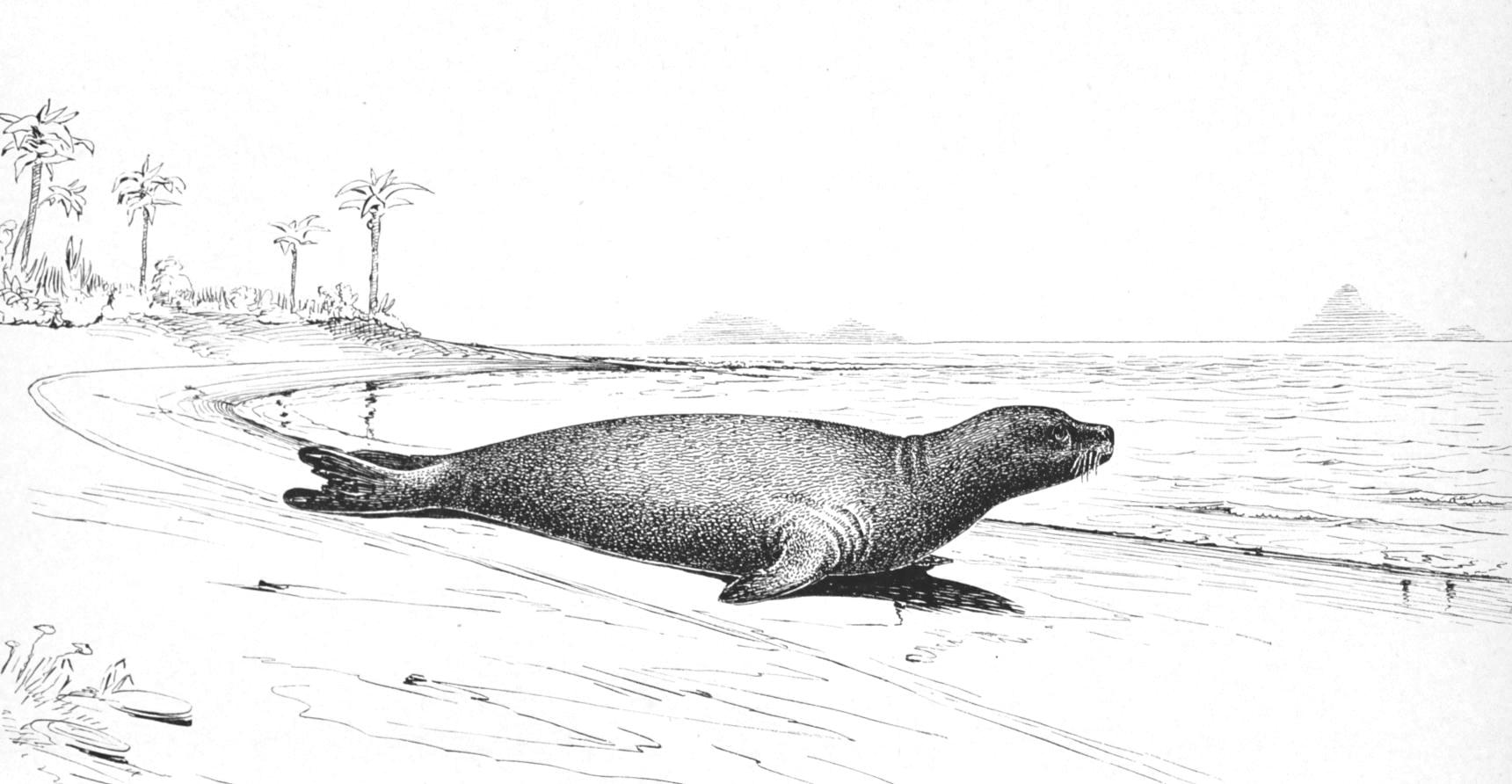
  - Illustration of the recently extinct Neomonachus tropicalis, or Caribbean monk seal
    †Neomonachus tropicalis
- Neotoma
  - †Neotoma floridana
- Nerita
- Neritina
- Nerodia
  - †Nerodia fasciata
  - †Nerodia sipedon
- Neverita
- Notophthalmus
  - †Notophthalmus viridescens
- Nucula
  - †Nucula proxima
- Nummulites
- Odocoileus
  - †Odocoileus virginianus
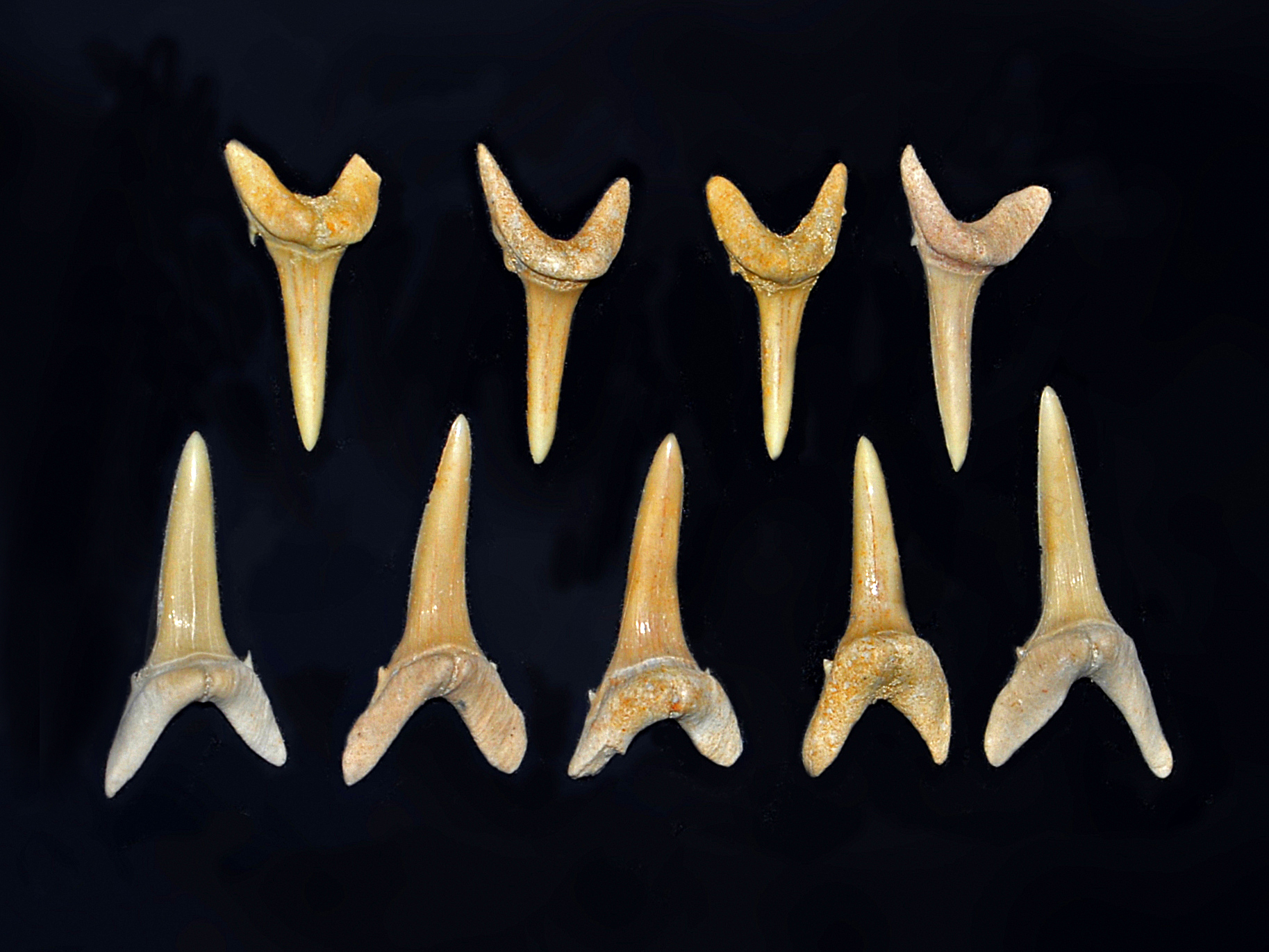
- Fossil teeth of Odontaspis winkleri from Khouribga (Morocco), 55-45 mya
  Odontaspis
- Oliva
  - †Oliva sayana
- Ondatra
  - †Ondatra zibethicus
- †Ontocetus
  - †Ontocetus emmonsi
- †Opsanus
- Oryzomys
  - †Oryzomys palustris
- Ostrea
- †Otodus
- Otus
  - †Otus asio
- †Palaeolama
- †Palaeophis
- Panopea
- Panthera
  - †Panthera onca
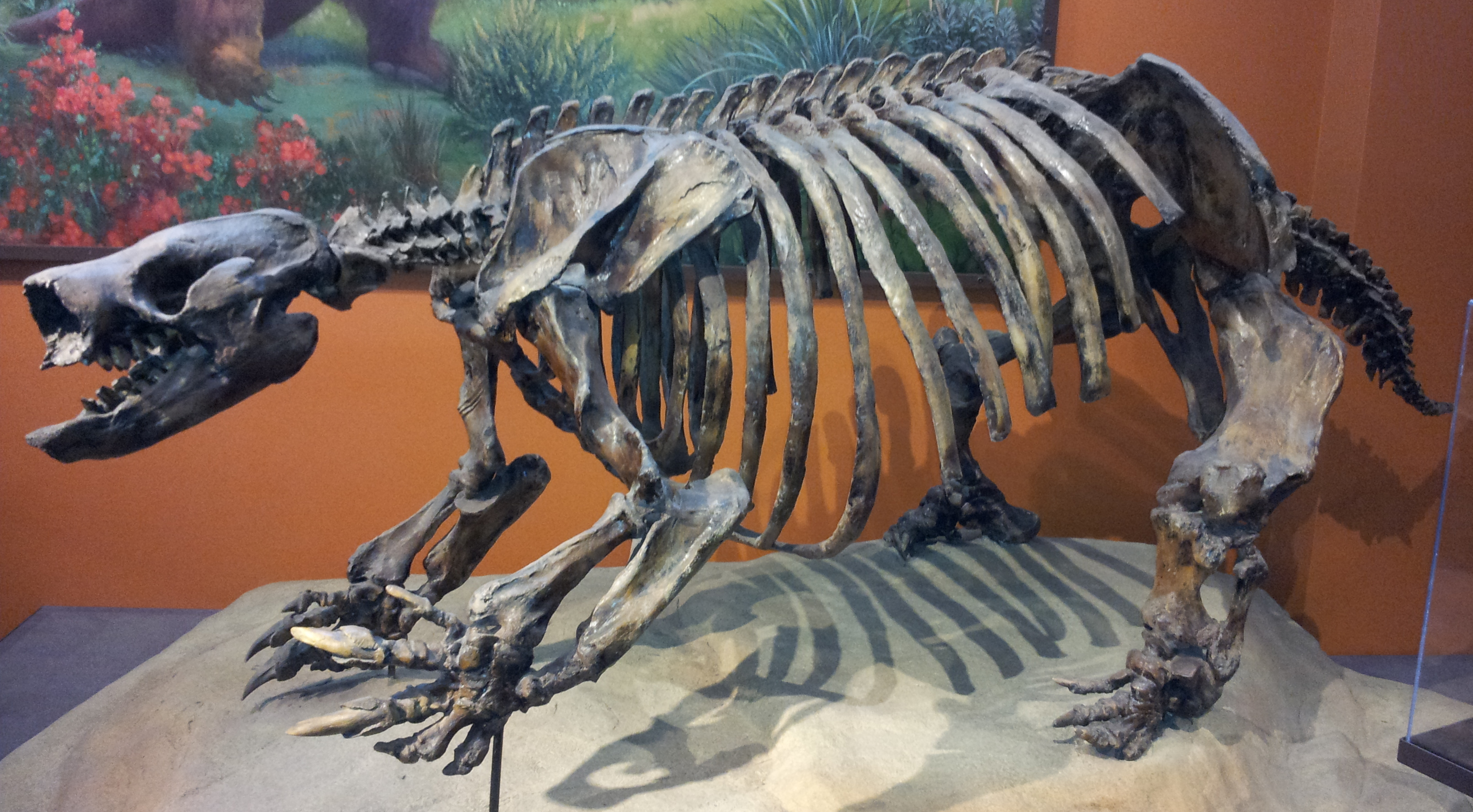
- Fossilized skeleton of the Pliocene-Pleistocene ground sloth Paramylodon
  †Paramylodon
  - †Paramylodon harlani
- Pecten
- Pekania
  - †Pekania pennanti
- Periglypta
- Peromyscus
  - †Peromyscus leucopus – or unidentified comparable form
  - †Peromyscus maniculatus – or unidentified comparable form
  - †Peromyscus polionotus – or unidentified comparable form
- Persicula
- Persististrombus
- Petricola
  - †Petricola pholadiformis
- Phyllodus
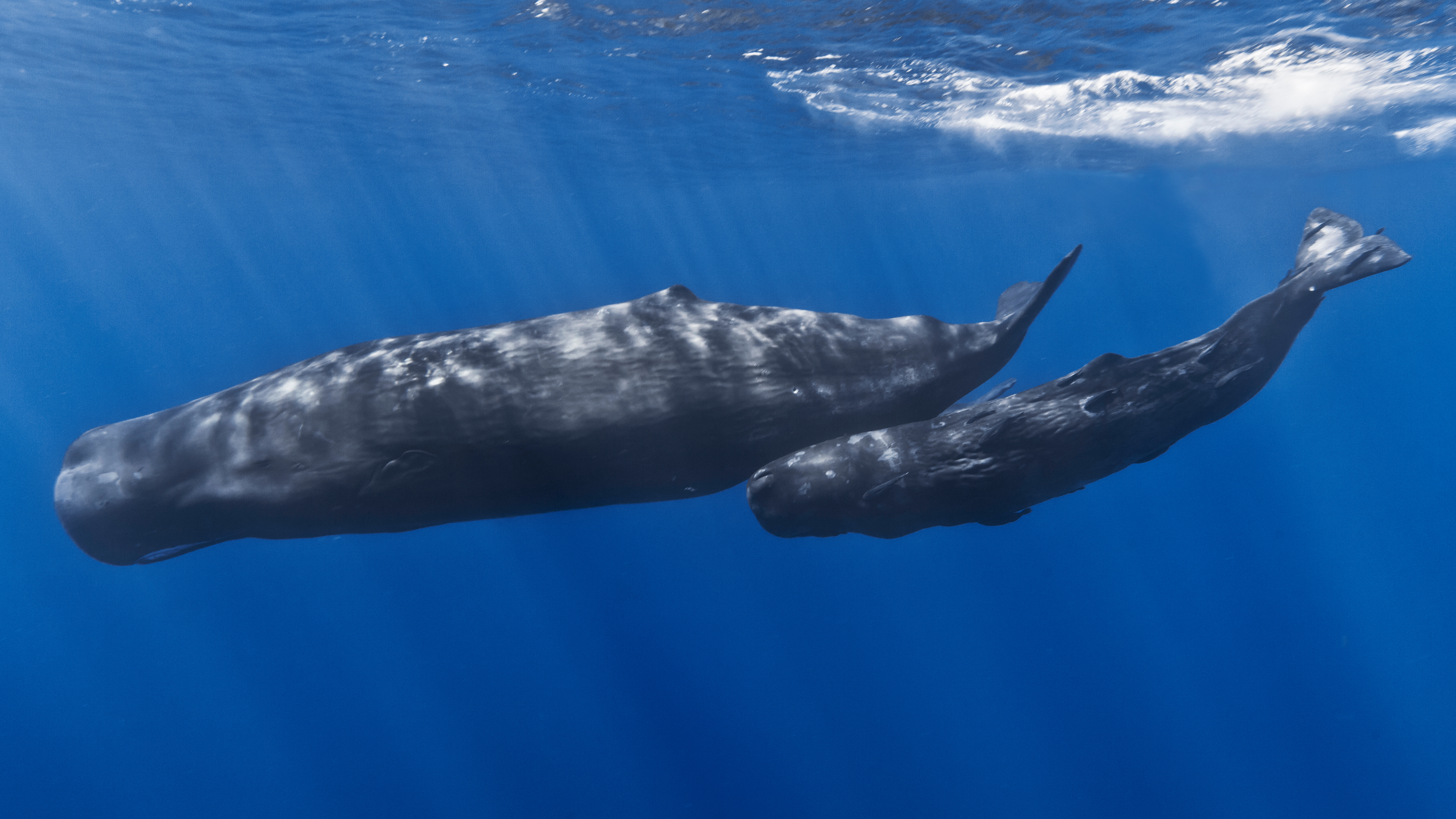
- A living Physeter macrocephalus, or sperm whale
  Physeter
- †Physeterula
- †Physogaleus
- Pica
  - †Pica pica
- Picoides
  - †Picoides villosus
- Pipistrellus
  - †Pipistrellus subflavus – or unidentified comparable form
- Pitar
- Pituophis
- Placopecten
  - †Placopecten magellanicus
- Planorbis
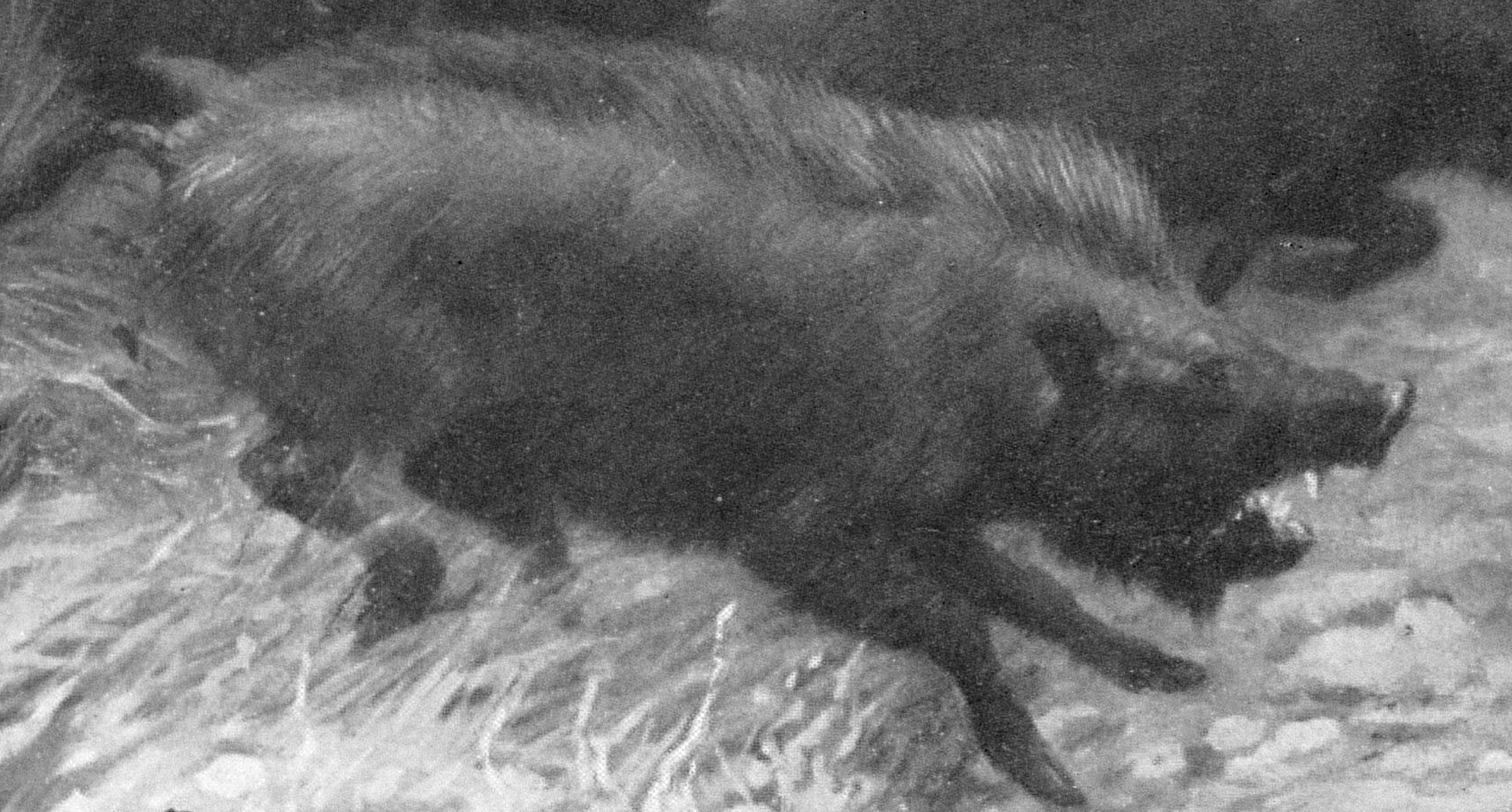
- Restoration of a herd of alarmed Miocene-Pleistocene peccaries of the genus Platygonus. Charles R. Knight (1922).
  †Platygonus
  - †Platygonus compressus – or unidentified comparable form
- Plethodon
  - †Plethodon glutinosus – or unidentified comparable form
- Pleuromeris
  - †Pleuromeris tridentata
- Plicatula
- Podilymbus
  - †Podilymbus podiceps
- Pogonias
  - †Pogonias cromis
- †Potamides
- Prionotus
- Pristis
- Procyon
  - †Procyon lotor
- Pseudacris
  - †Pseudacris ornata
- Pseudemys
  - †Pseudemys concinna – or unidentified comparable form
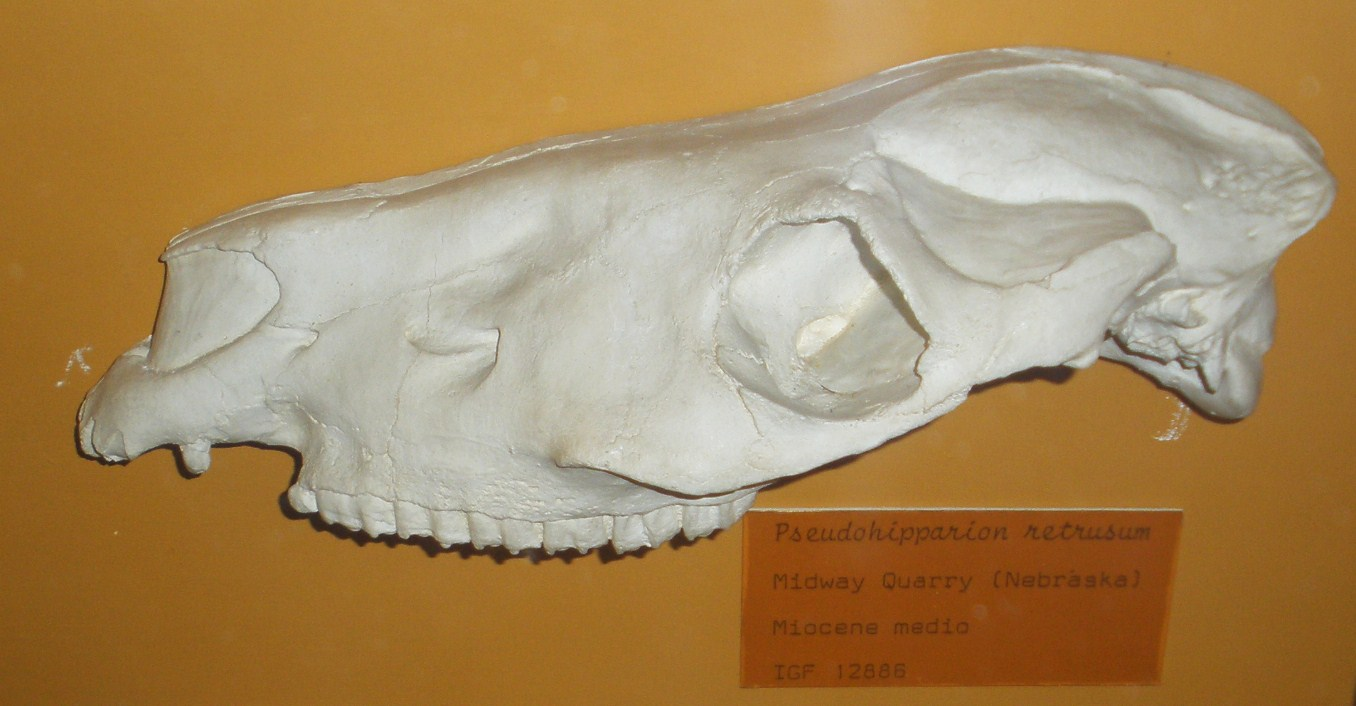
- Replica of a fossilized cranium of the Miocene horse Pseudhipparion
  †Pseudhipparion
- Pseudotriton
  - †Pseudotriton ruber
- Pteria – report made of unidentified related form or using admittedly obsolete nomenclature
- Pterynotus
- Puma
  - †Puma concolor
- Quercus
- Raja
- †Raja
- †Rana
  - †Rana catesbeiana
  - †Rana pipiens
- Rangia
- Rangifer
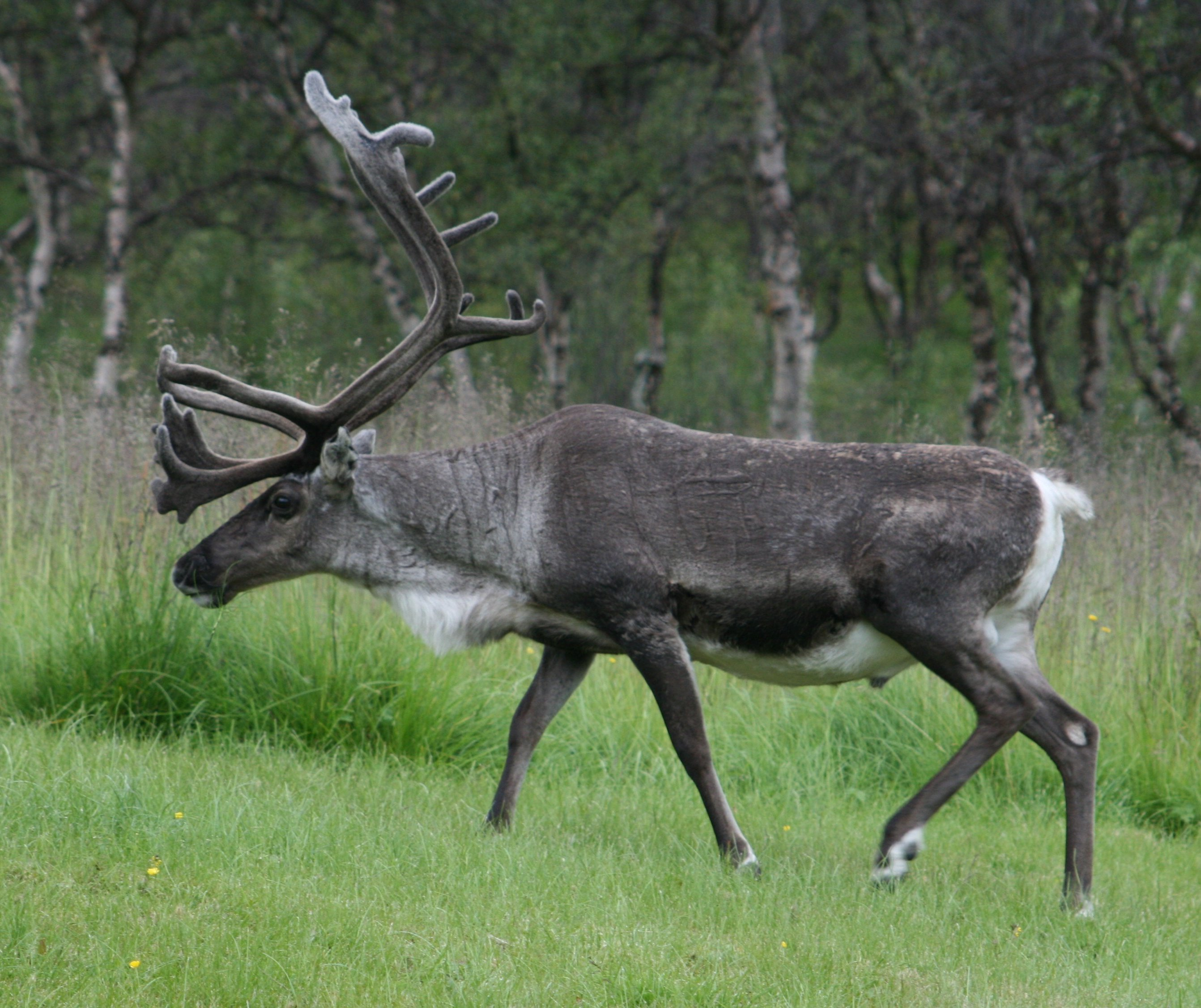
  - A living Rangifer tarandus, or reindeer
    †Rangifer tarandus
- Rapana
- †Regina
- Rhinobatos
- Rhinoptera
- Rhizoprionodon
  - †Rhizoprionodon terraenovae
- Sayornis
  - †Sayornis phoebe
- Scalopus
  - †Scalopus aquaticus
- Sceloporus
  - †Sceloporus undulatus
- Schizaster
- Schizoporella
- Sciurus
  - †Sciurus carolinensis
- †Scoliodon
- Scolopax
  - †Scolopax minor
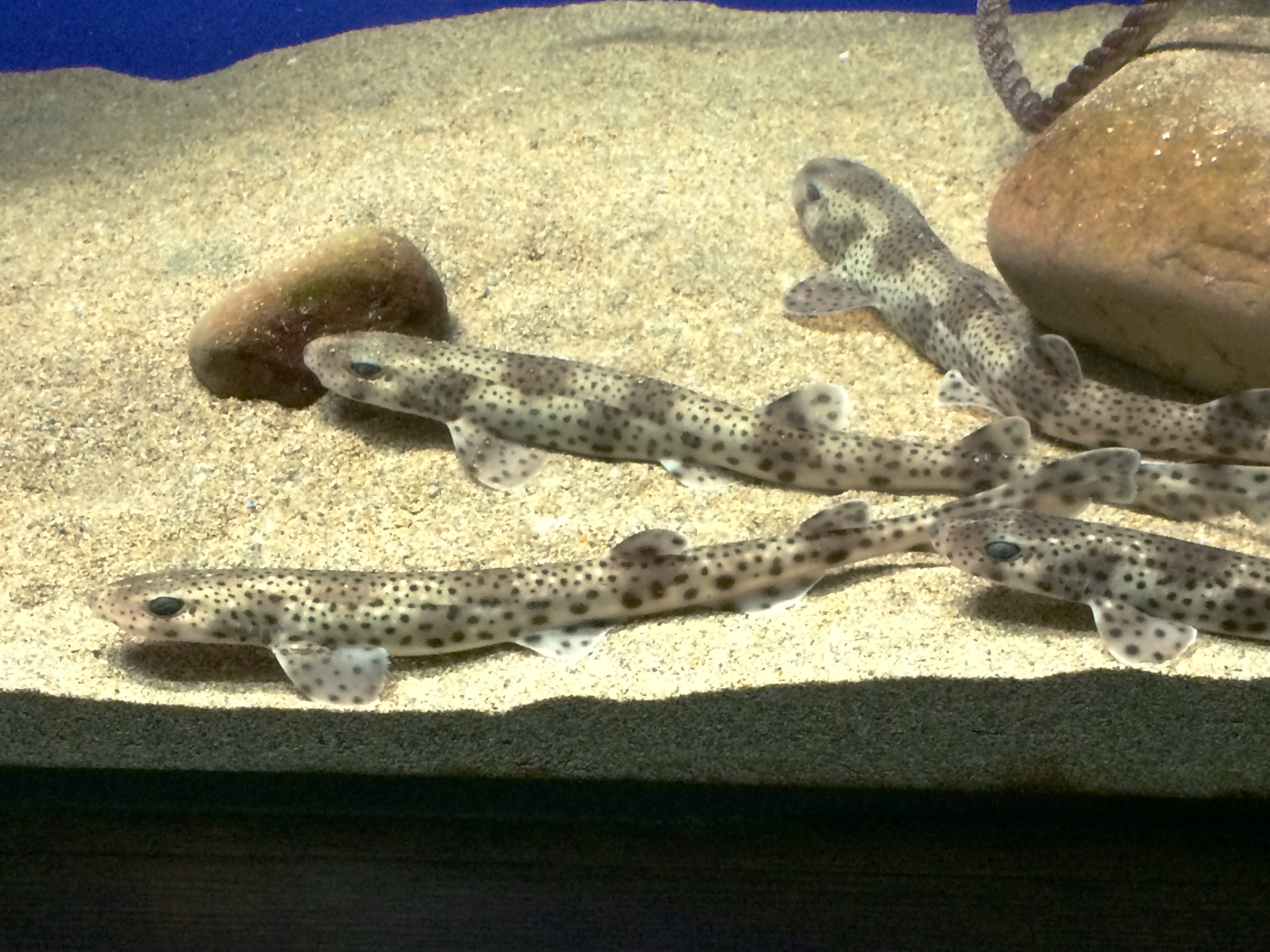
- Group of living Scyliorhinus catsharks
  Scyliorhinus
- Semele – tentative report
- Siderastrea
- Sigmodon
  - †Sigmodon hispidus
- Sinum
- Siren
  - †Siren intermedia – or unidentified comparable form
- Solemya
- Sorex
  - †Sorex cinereus
  - †Sorex fumeus
- Sphyraena
- Sphyrna
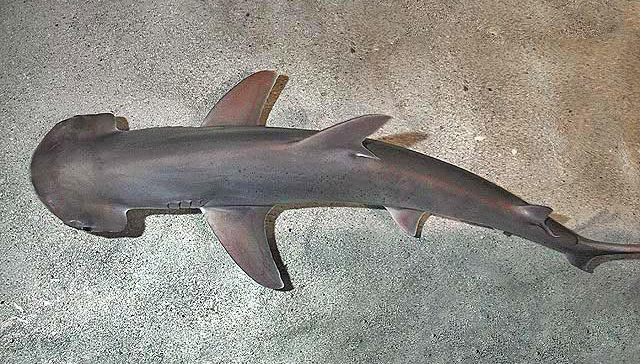
  - A living Sphyrna tiburo, or bonnethead shark
    †Sphyrna tiburo
  - †Sphyrna zygaena
- Spilogale
  - †Spilogale putorius
- Spisula
- Spizella
  - †Spizella passerina
- Spondylus
- Squatina
- Sternotherus
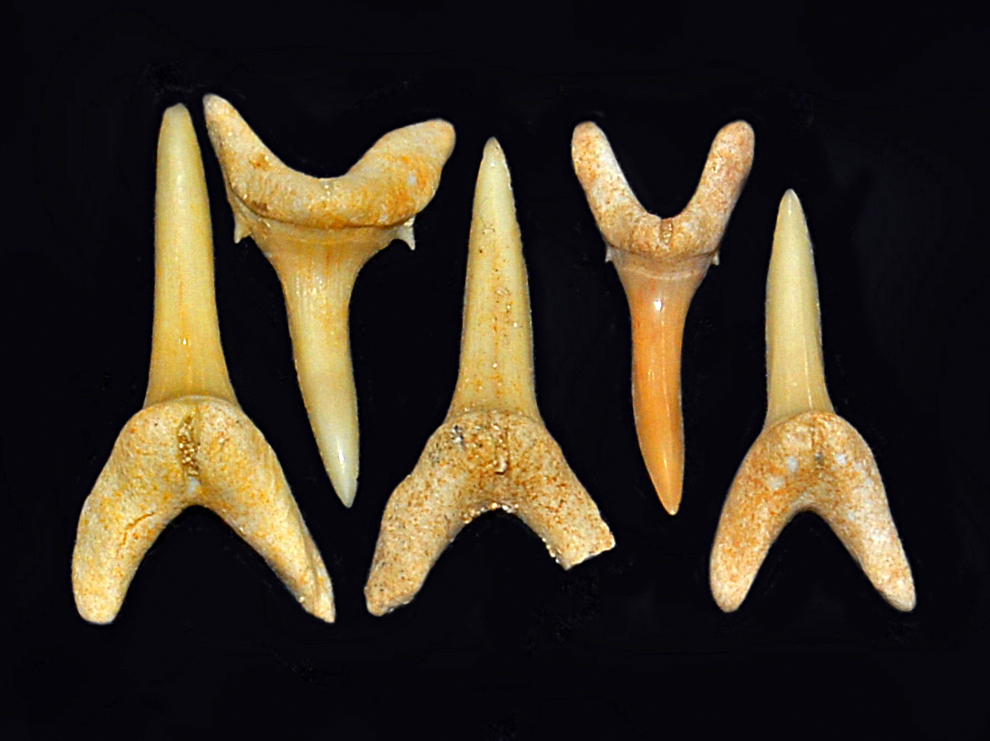
- Fossilized teeth of the Paleocene-Miocene sandshark Striatolamia
  †Striatolamia
- Strioterebrum
- Strombus
- Stylophora
- Sylvilagus
  - †Sylvilagus floridanus
  - †Sylvilagus palustris
  - †Sylvilagus transitionalis
- Synaptomys
  - †Synaptomys cooperi
- Synodus
- Tamias – type locality for genus
  - †Tamias aristus – type locality for species
- Tapirus
  - †Tapirus veroensis
- Taxodium
- Teinostoma
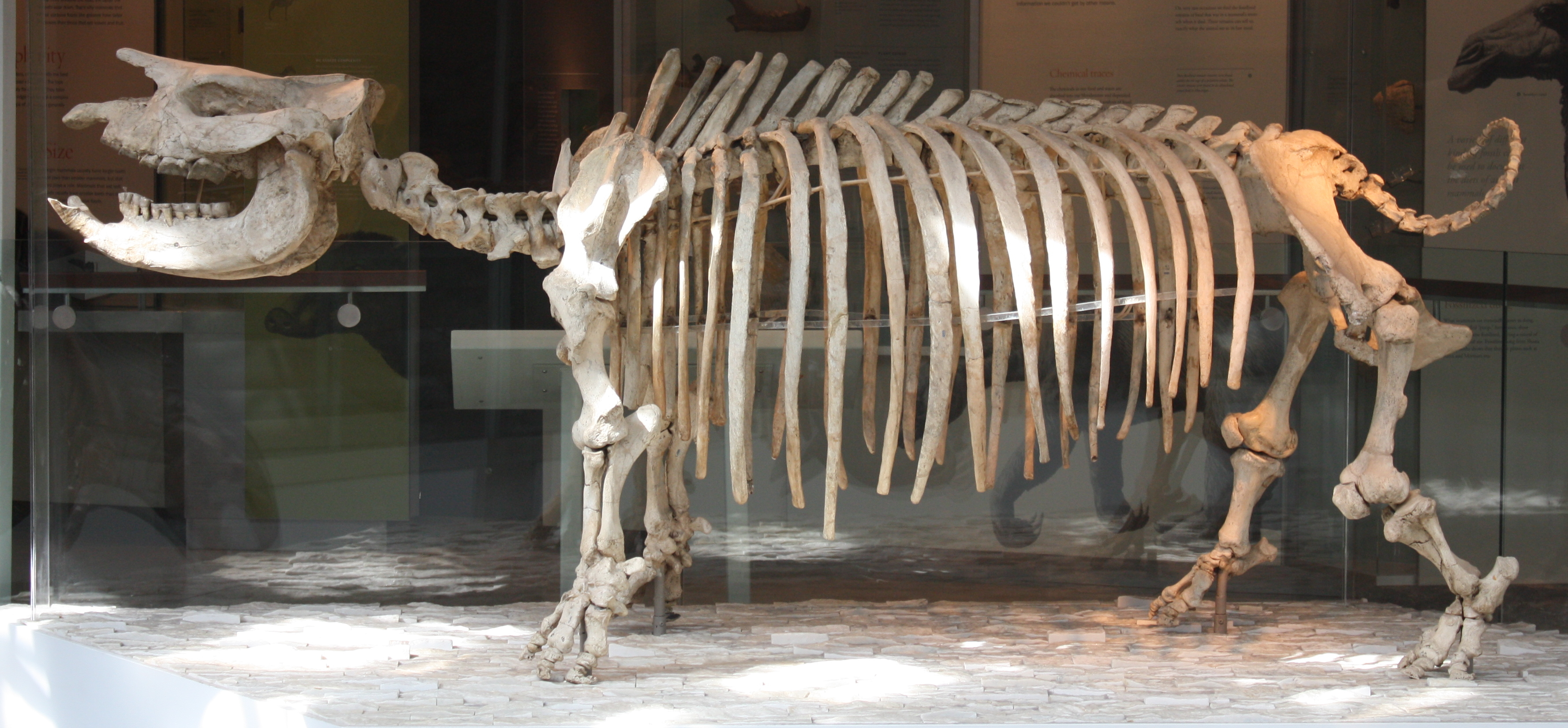
- Mounted fossilized skeleton of the Miocene-Pliocene rhinoceros Teleoceras
  †Teleoceras
- Tellina
- Teredo
- Terrapene
  - †Terrapene carolina
- Thamnophis
  - †Thamnophis sirtalis
- Trachemys
  - †Trachemys scripta
- Trachycardium
- Trachyphyllia – tentative report
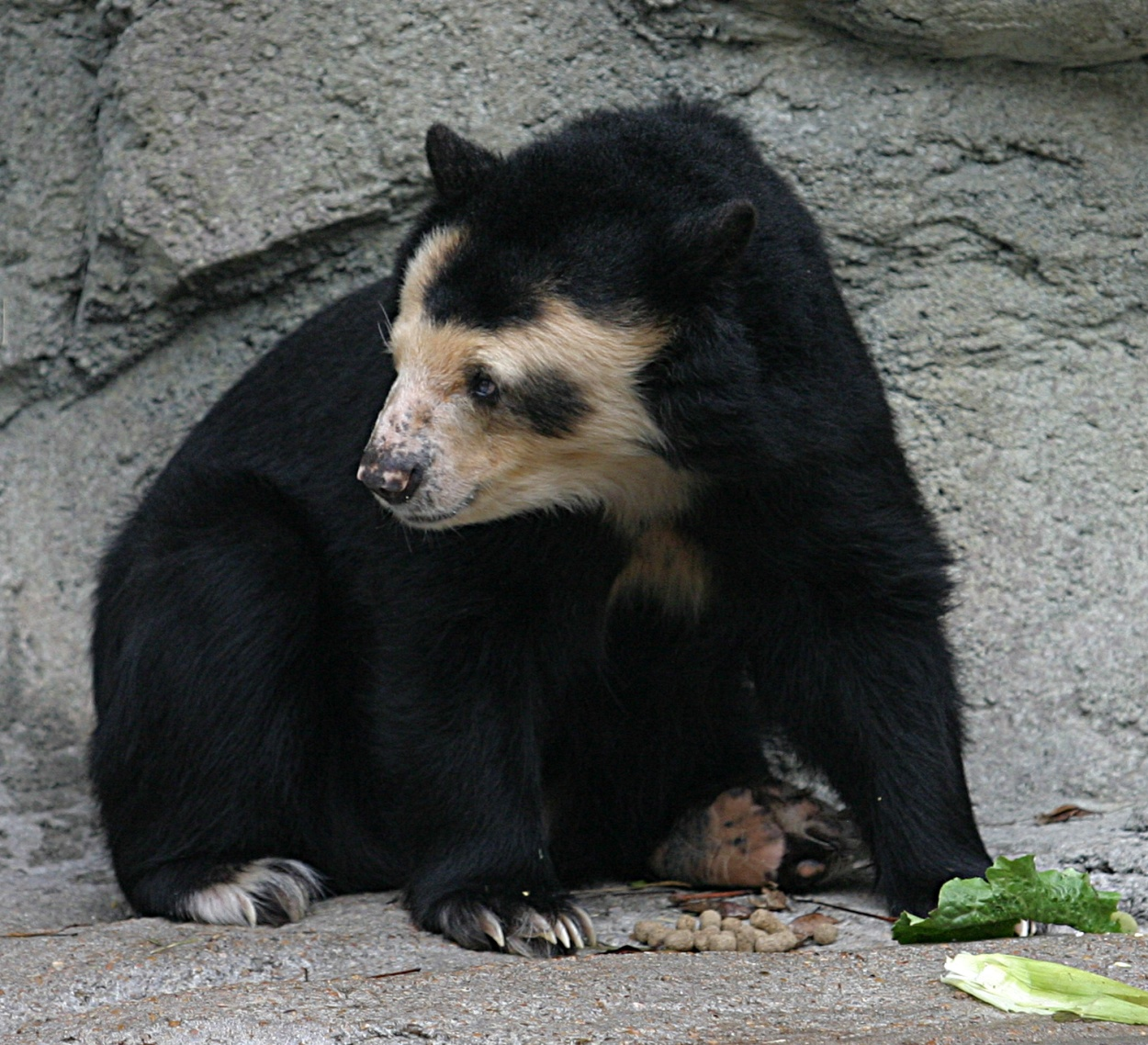
- A living Tremarctos, or spectacled bear
  Tremarctos
  - †Tremarctos floridanus
- †Triaenodon
- Trichiurus
- Trochita
- Turris
- Turritella
- Tympanuchus
  - †Tympanuchus cupido
- Ulmus
- Urocyon
  - †Urocyon cinereoargenteus
- Ursus
  - †Ursus americanus
- Venericardia
- Xenophora
  - †Xenophora conchyliophora
- Yoldia
- Zapus
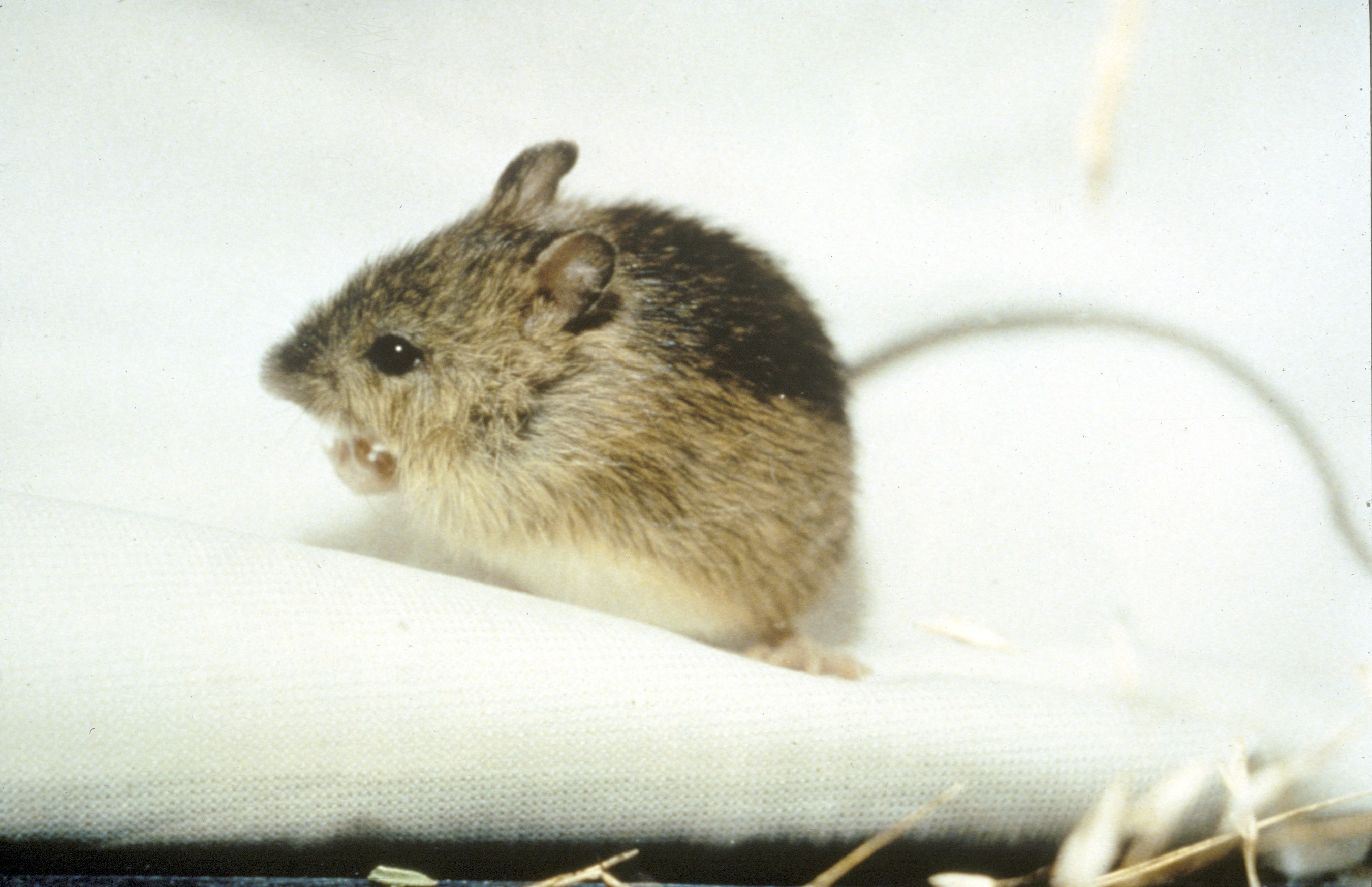
  - A living Zapus hudsonius, or meadow jumping mouse
    †Zapus hudsonius
