= List of the Mesozoic life of Georgia (U.S. state) =

This list of the Mesozoic life of Georgia contains the various prehistoric life-forms whose fossilized remains have been reported from within the US state of Georgia and are between 252.17 and 66 million years of age.

== A ==
- †Aciculiscala
  - †Aciculiscala acuta
- Acirsa
  - †Acirsa americana – or unidentified related form
  - †Acirsa flexicostata
- Acteon
  - †Acteon cicatricosus
- †Acteonella
- †Acutostrea
  - †Acutostrea plumosa
- †Aenona
  - †Aenona eufaulensis
  - †Aenona georgiana
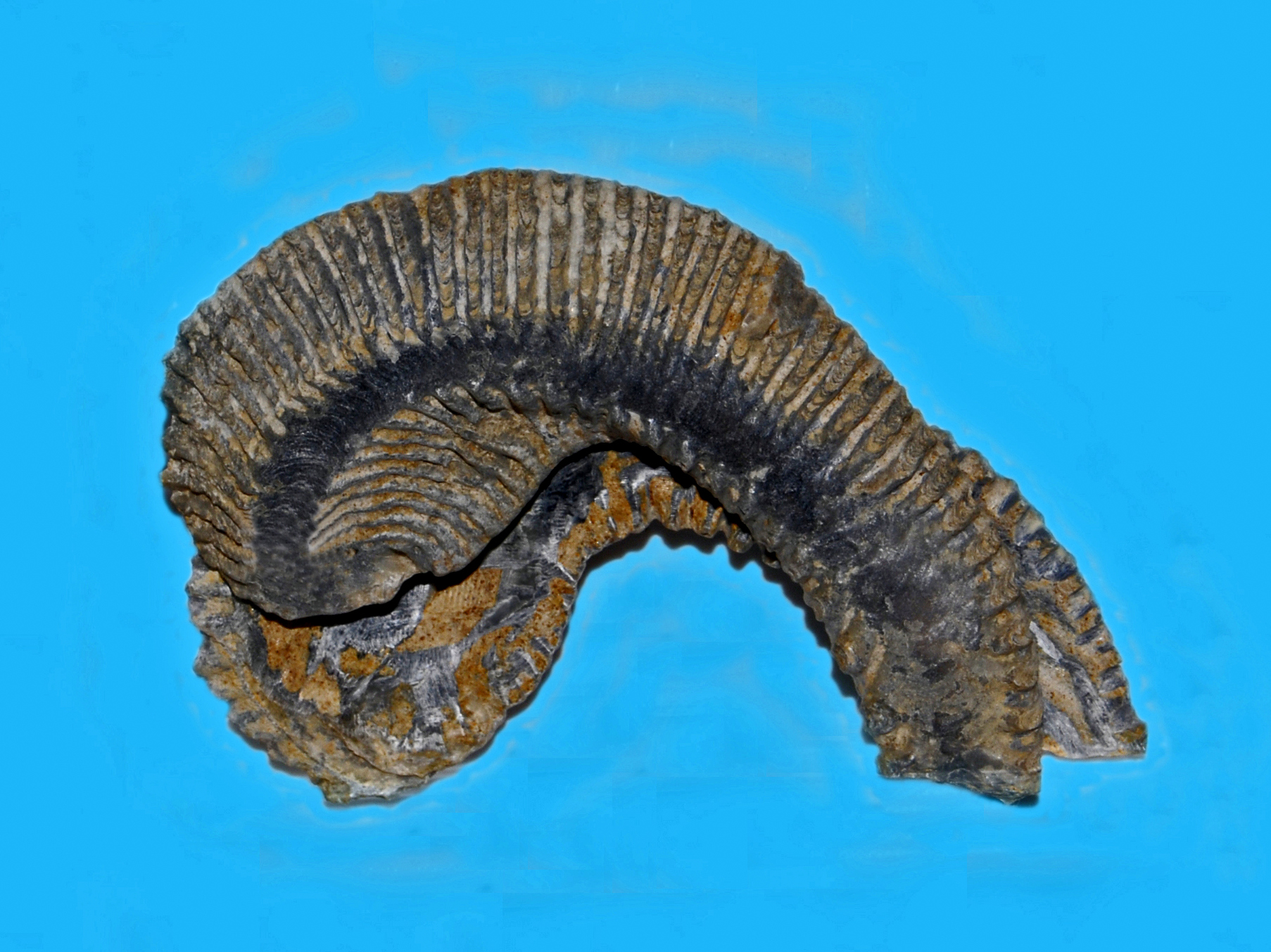
- Fossilized shell of the Late Cretaceous oyster Agerostrea
  †Agerostrea
  - †Agerostrea mesenterica
- †Albertosaurus
- †Aliofusus
- †Allonia – type locality for genus
  - †Allonia decandra – type locality for species
- †Amaurellina
- Amauropsis
- †Ambigostrea
  - †Ambigostrea tecticosta
- †Anatimya
  - †Anatimya anteradiata
- †Anchura
  - †Anchura noakensis – tentative report
- †Ancilla
  - †Ancilla acutula
- †Androdecidua – type locality for genus
  - †Androdecidua endressii – type locality for species
- †Anomaeodus
  - †Anomaeodus phaseolus
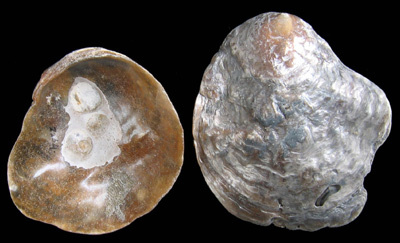
- Interior and exterior of a shell of an Anomia, or jingle shell
  †Anomia
  - †Anomia argentaria
  - †Anomia ornata
  - †Anomia preolmstedi
  - †Anomia tellinoides
- †Anomoeodus
  - †Anomoeodus phaseolus
- †Antiquacupula – type locality for genus
  - †Antiquacupula sulcata – type locality for species
- †Aphrodina
  - †Aphrodina tippana
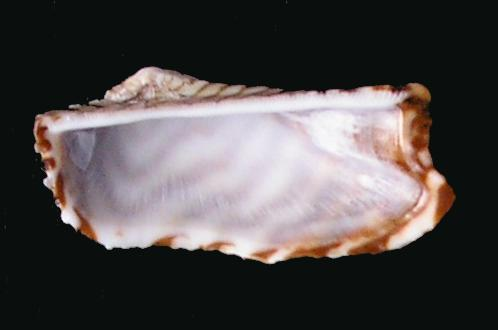
- Interior of the shell of an Arca ark clam
  †Arca
- Arrhoges
- Astarte
  - †Astarte culebrensis
- Ataphrus

== B ==
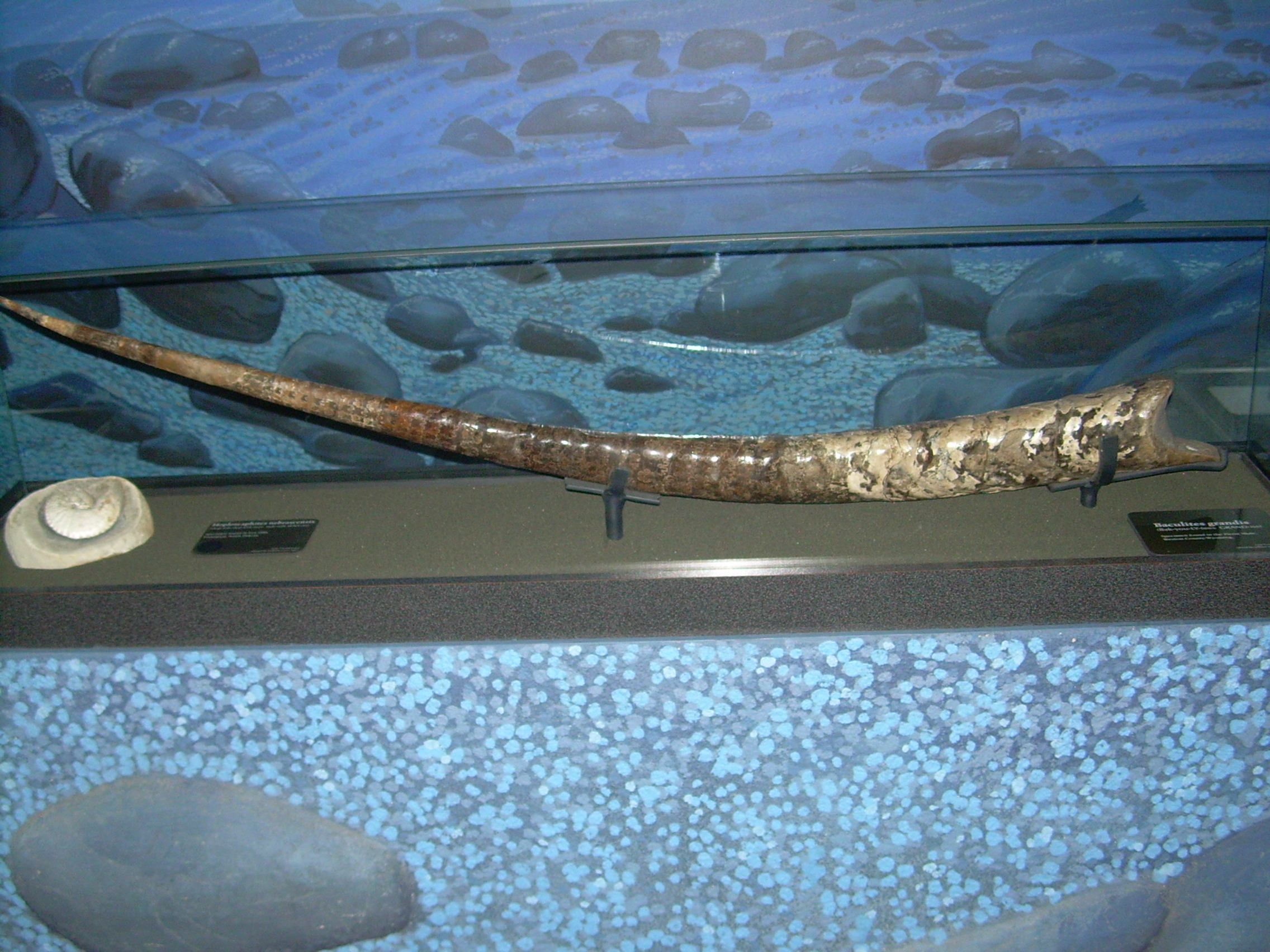
- Fossilized shell of the Late Cretaceous ammonoid cephalopod Baculites
  †Baculites
- †Bathytormus
  - †Bathytormus pteropsis
- †Bedellia – type locality for genus
  - †Bedellia pusilla – type locality for species
- †Bellifusus
  - †Bellifusus angulicostatus – or unidentified related form
  - †Bellifusus curvicostatus
  - †Bellifusus spinosus
- †Beretra
- †Boodlepteris – or unidentified comparable form
- †Borodinopristis
  - †Borodinopristis ackermani – type locality for species
  - †Borodinopristis schwimmeri – type locality for species
- †Borodinoptristis
  - †Borodinoptristis schwimmeri
- Botula
  - †Botula conchafodentis
  - †Botula ripleyana
- Brachidontes
- †Brachyrhizodus
  - †Brachyrhizodus wichitaensis
- †Buccinopsis
  - †Buccinopsis crassicostata

== C ==
- Cadulus
  - †Cadulus obnutus
- Caestocorbula
  - †Caestocorbula crassaplica
  - †Caestocorbula crassiplica
  - †Caestocorbula percompressa
  - †Caestocorbula suffalciata
  - †Caestocorbula terramaria
- †Calliomphalus
  - †Calliomphalus americanus
  - †Calliomphalus nudus
- †Camptonectes
  - †Camptonectes argillensis
  - †Camptonectes bubonis
- †Campylopodium – type locality for genus
  - †Campylopodium allonense – type locality for species
- Cardium
- †Caryanthus
- Caryocorbula
  - †Caryocorbula veatchi
  - †Caryocorbula veatci
- †Caveola
- Cerithiella
  - †Cerithiella nodoliratum – or unidentified related form
- †Chedighaii
  - †Chedighaii barberi
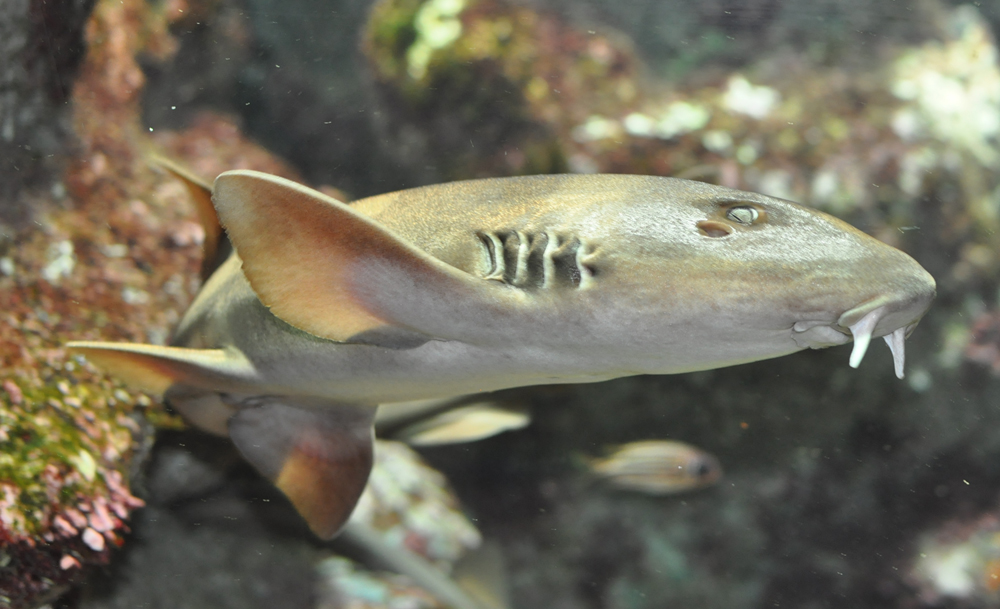
- A living Chiloscyllium longtail carpet shark
  Chiloscyllium
- Chiton
  - †Chiton berryi
- Chlamys
  - †Chlamys mississippensis
- †Clarkiella
  - †Clarkiella hemispherica
- †Clavipholas
  - †Clavipholas pectorosa
- Cliona
- †Clisocolus
  - †Clisocolus concentricum
- †Columbusia – type locality for genus
  - †Columbusia fragilis – type locality for species
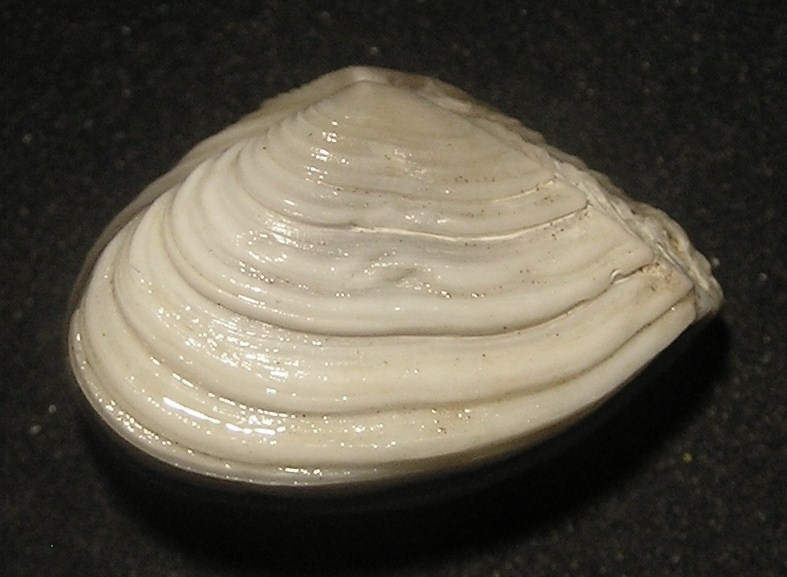
- Shell of a Corbula basket clam
  Corbula
  - †Corbula subradiata
  - †Corbula torta
- Crassatella
  - †Crassatella vadosa
- Crassostrea
  - †Crassostrea cortex
  - †Crassostrea cusseta
- †Crenella
  - †Crenella elegantula
  - †Crenella serica
- †Creonella
  - †Creonella subangulata – or unidentified comparable form
  - †Creonella triplicata
- †Cretodus
  - †Cretodus borodini
  - †Cretodus semiplicatus
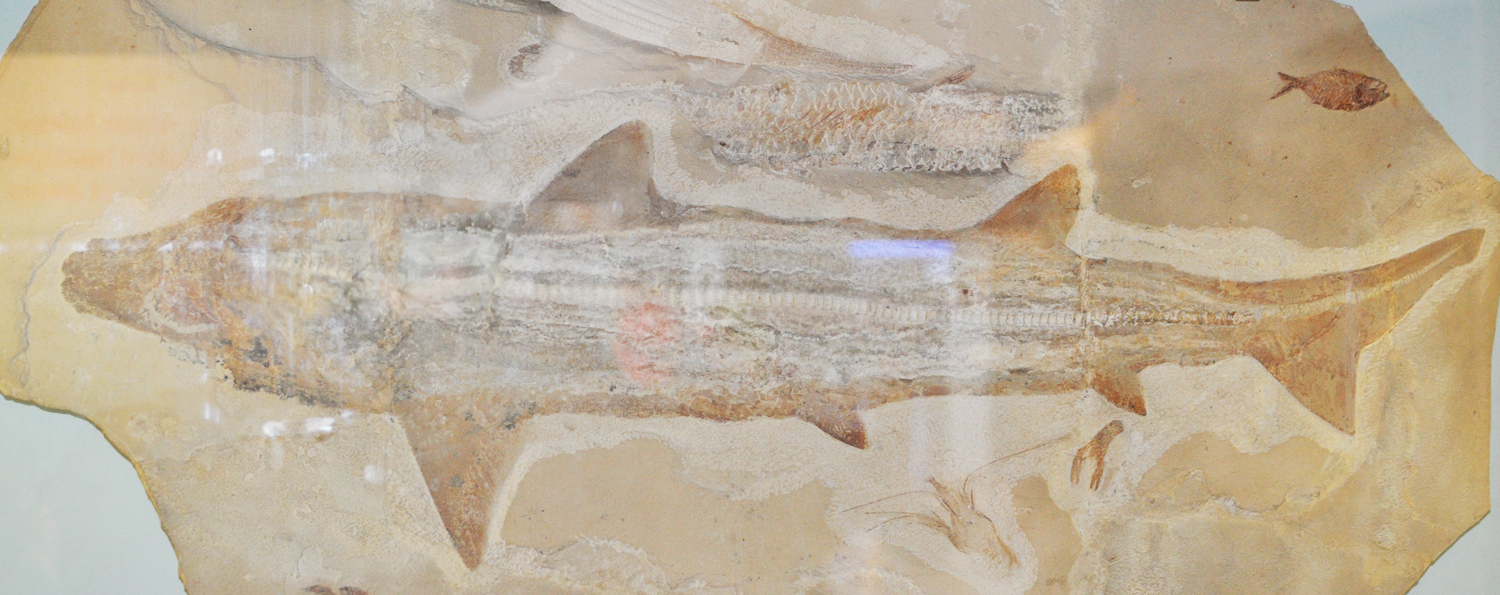
- Fossil of the Early Cretaceous-Eocene shark Cretolamna
  †Cretolamna
  - †Cretolamna appendiculata
- Cucullaea
  - †Cucullaea capax
  - †Cucullaea littlei
- †Cuna
  - †Cuna texana
- Cuspidaria
  - †Cuspidaria grandis
- †Cyclorisma
  - †Cyclorisma parva
- Cylichna
  - †Cylichna diversilirata
  - †Cylichna incisa
- Cylichnella
- †Cymbophora
  - †Cymbophora appressa
  - †Cymbophora berryi
  - †Cymbophora lintea
  - †Cymbophora ochilleana
  - †Cymbophora wordeni
- †Cyprimeria
  - †Cyprimeria alta
  - †Cyprimeria depressa

== D ==
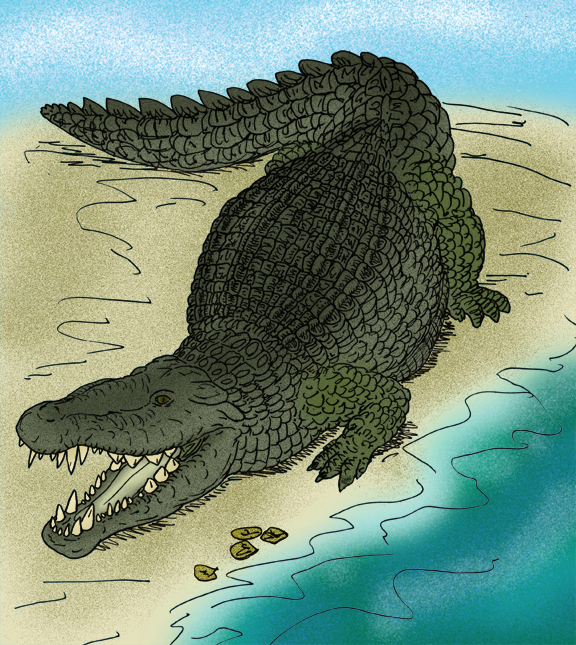
- Restoration of the Late Cretaceous Alligator relative Deinosuchus
  †Deinosuchus
  - †Deinosuchus rugosus
- Dentalium
  - †Dentalium leve
- †Detrusandra – or unidentified comparable form
- †Deussenia
  - †Deussenia bellalirata
- †Dolicholatirus
  - †Dolicholatirus torquatus
- †Drilluta
  - †Drilluta distans
  - †Drilluta major – or unidentified comparable form

== E ==
- †Ellipsoscapha
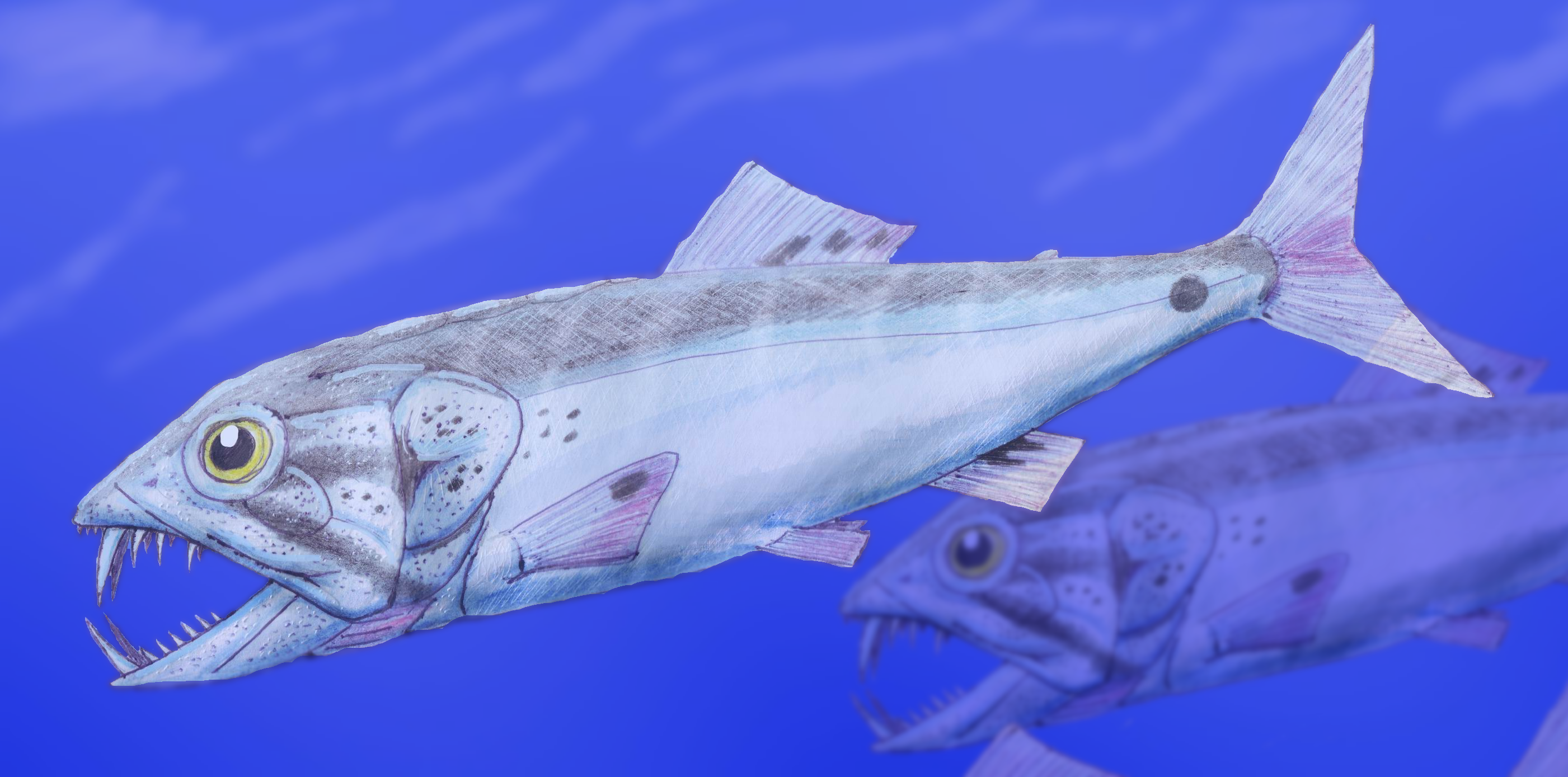
- Restoration of the Early Cretaceous-Eocene bony fish Enchodus, or the "saber-toothed herring"
  †Enchodus
  - †Enchodus petrosus
- †Eoacteon
  - †Eoacteon linteus
- †Eopolytrichum – type locality for genus
  - †Eopolytrichum antiquum – type locality for species
- †Erguitaia
  - †Erguitaia benningensis – type locality for species
  - †Erguitaia rugosa – type locality for species
- †Etea
- †Eulima
  - †Eulima gracilistylis
  - †Eulima monmouthensis
- †Euspira
  - †Euspira rectilabrum
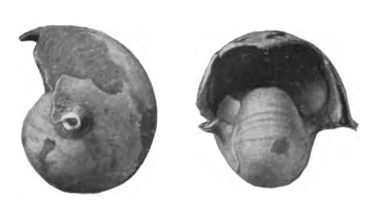
- Illustration in multiple views of a fossilized shell of the Late Jurassic-Miocene nautiloid cephalopod Eutrephoceras
  †Eutrephoceras
  - †Eutrephoceras dekayi
- †Exogyra
  - †Exogyra costata
  - †Exogyra ponderosa
  - †Exogyra upatoiensis

== F ==
- †Flemingostrea
  - †Flemingostrea cretacea
  - †Flemingostrea subspatula
- †Fulgerca
  - †Fulgerca attenuata – or unidentified related form

== G ==
- Gemmula
- †Gervilliopsis
  - †Gervilliopsis ensiformis
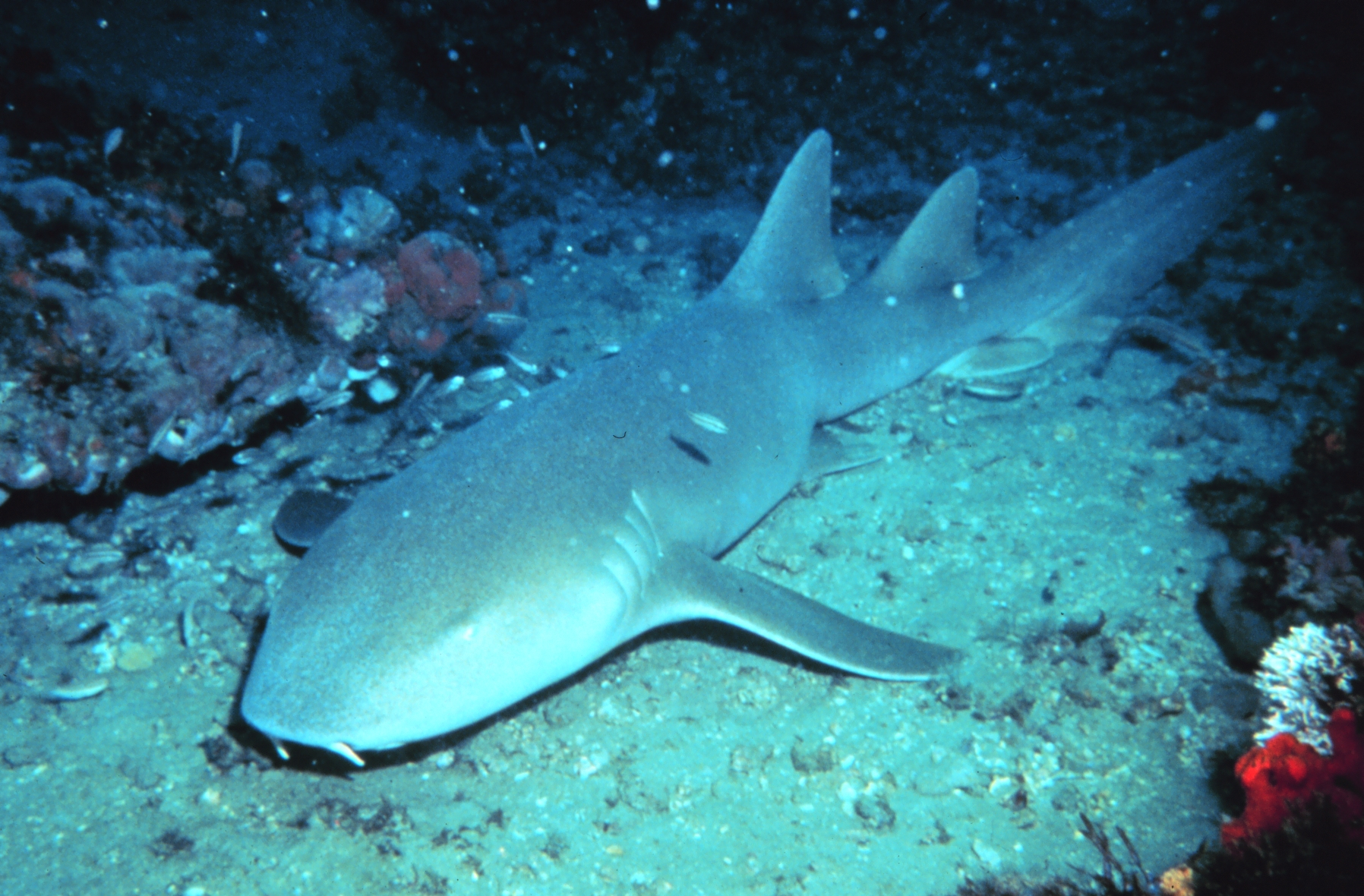
- A living Ginglymostoma nurse shark
  Ginglymostoma
  - †Ginglymostoma globidens
- Glossus
- Glycymeris
  - †Glycymeris hamula
  - †Glycymeris rotundata
- †Goniocylichna
- †Graciliala
  - †Graciliala decemlirata
- †Granocardium
  - †Granocardium bowenae – or unidentified comparable form
  - †Granocardium kuemmeli
  - †Granocardium kummeli
  - †Granocardium lowei
  - †Granocardium tippananum
  - †Granocardium tippanum
- †Graphidula
- †Gryphaeostrea
  - †Gryphaeostrea vomer
- Gyrodes
  - †Gyrodes spillmani
  - †Gyrodes supraplicatus
- †Gyrostrea
  - †Gyrostrea cortex

== H ==
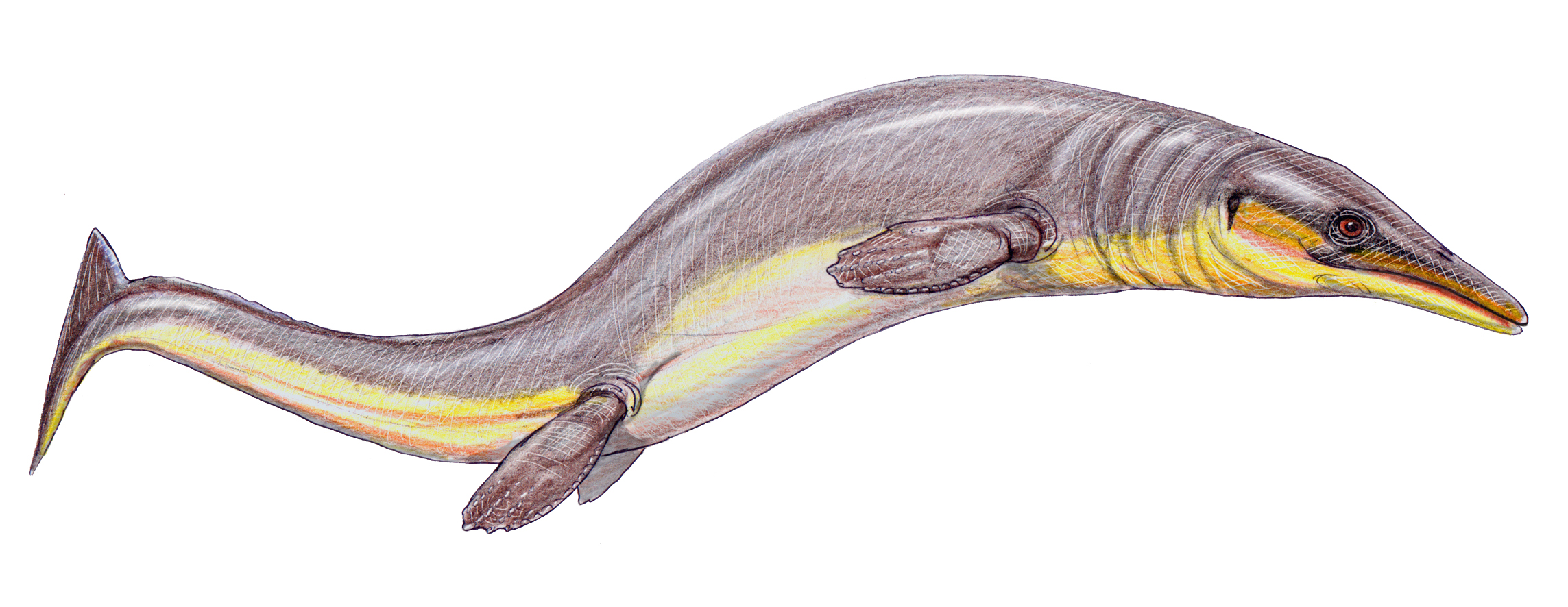
- Life restoration of the Late Cretaceous mosasaur Halisaurus
  †Halisaurus
- †Hamulus
  - †Hamulus huntensis – tentative report
  - †Hamulus onyx
- †Harduinia
  - †Harduinia micrococcus
  - †Harduinia mortonis
- †Helicaulax
  - †Helicaulax formosa
- †Hercorhynchus
- Heterodontus
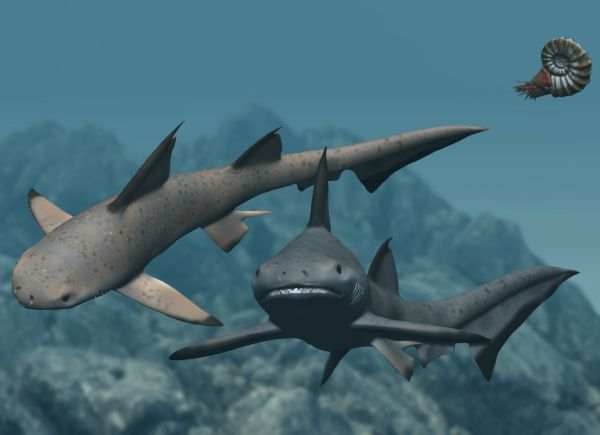
- Restoration of two of the Permian-Late Cretaceous cartilaginous fish Hybodus
  †Hybodus

== I ==
- †Inoperna
- †Ischyrhiza
  - †Ischyrhiza georgiensis – type locality for species
  - †Ischyrhiza mira
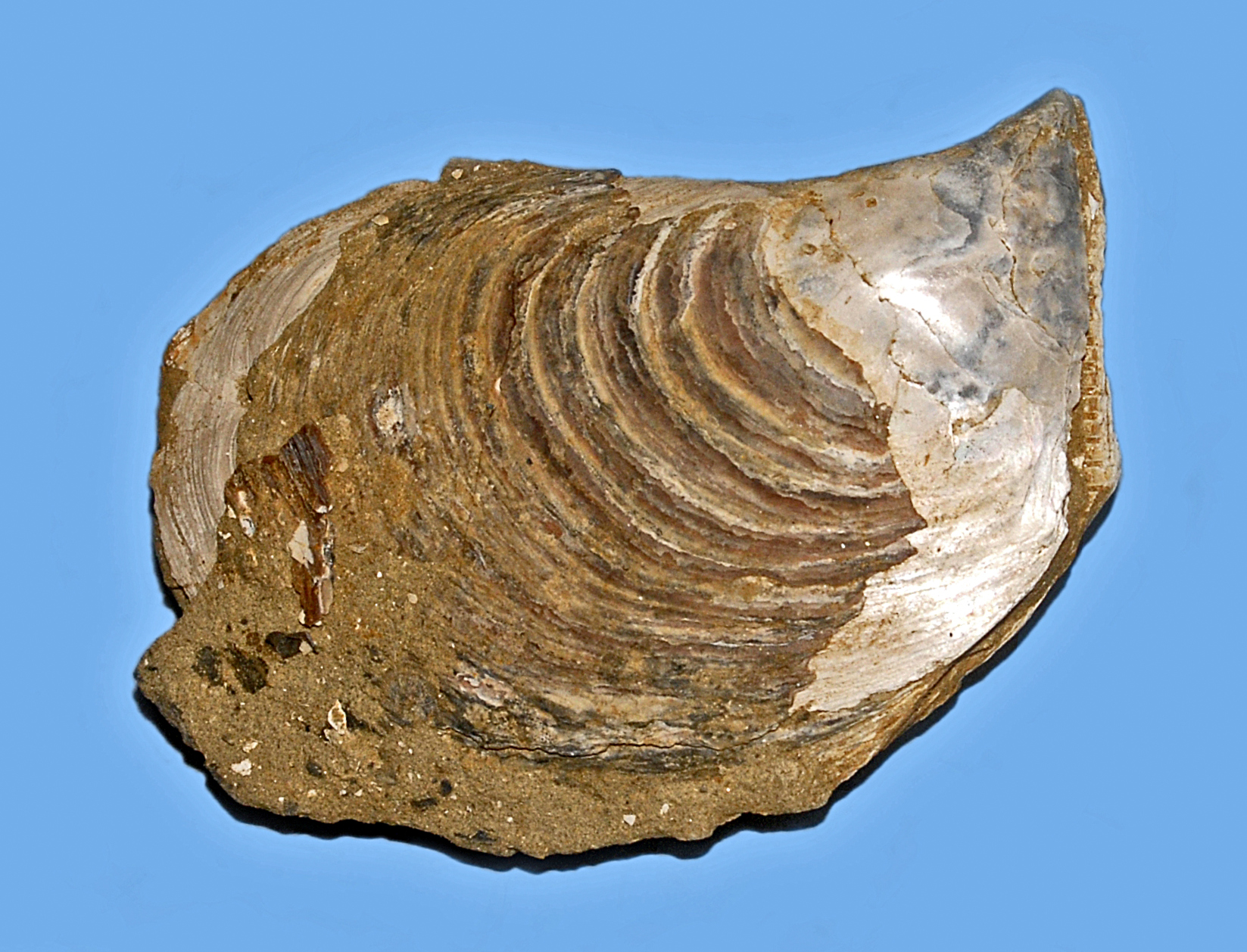
- Fossilized shell of the Permian-modern marine bivalve Isognomon
  Isognomon

== J ==
- Juliacorbula
  - †Juliacorbula monmouthensis

== L ==
- †Lacrimiforma
  - †Lacrimiforma secunda
- †Latiala
  - †Latiala lobata – or unidentified comparable form
- †Laxispira
  - †Laxispira monilifera
- †Legumen
  - †Legumen carolinensis – or unidentified comparable form
  - †Legumen ellipticum
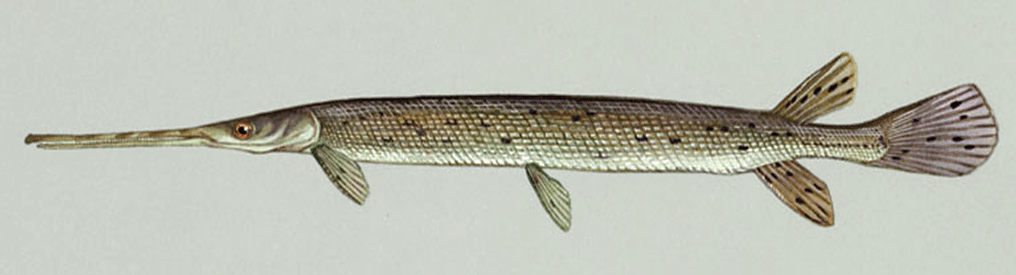
- Illustration of a living Lepisosteus, or gar
  Lepisosteus
- †Leptosolen
  - †Leptosolen biplicata
- Lima
  - †Lima pelagica
- Limatula
  - †Limatula acutilineata
- Limopsis
  - †Limopsis meeki
- †Linearis
  - †Linearis magnoliensis
  - †Linearis metastriata
  - †Linearis pectinis
- †Linter
  - †Linter acutata
- †Liopeplum
  - †Liopeplum canalis
  - †Liopeplum cretaceum
- †Liopistha
  - †Liopistha protexta
- †Liothyris
  - †Liothyris carolinensis
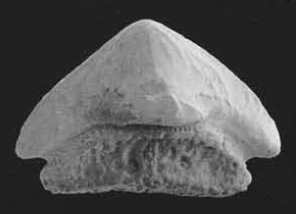
- Electron micrograph of fossilized teeth from the Early Jurassic-Early Cretaceous freshwater shark Lissodus
  †Lissodus
  - †Lissodus babulskii
- Lithophaga
- †Longitubus
- †Longoconcha
- Lopha
  - †Lopha falcata
  - †Lopha mesenterica
- †Lowenstamia
  - †Lowenstamia cucullata
- †Lycettia
  - †Lycettia tippana
  - †Lycettia tippanus

== M ==
- Malletia
  - †Malletia longfrons
  - †Malletia longifrons
  - †Malletia stephensoni
- †Mathilda
  - †Mathilda cedarensis – or unidentified comparable form
  - †Mathilda corona
  - †Mathilda ripleyana – or unidentified related form
- †Mauldinia
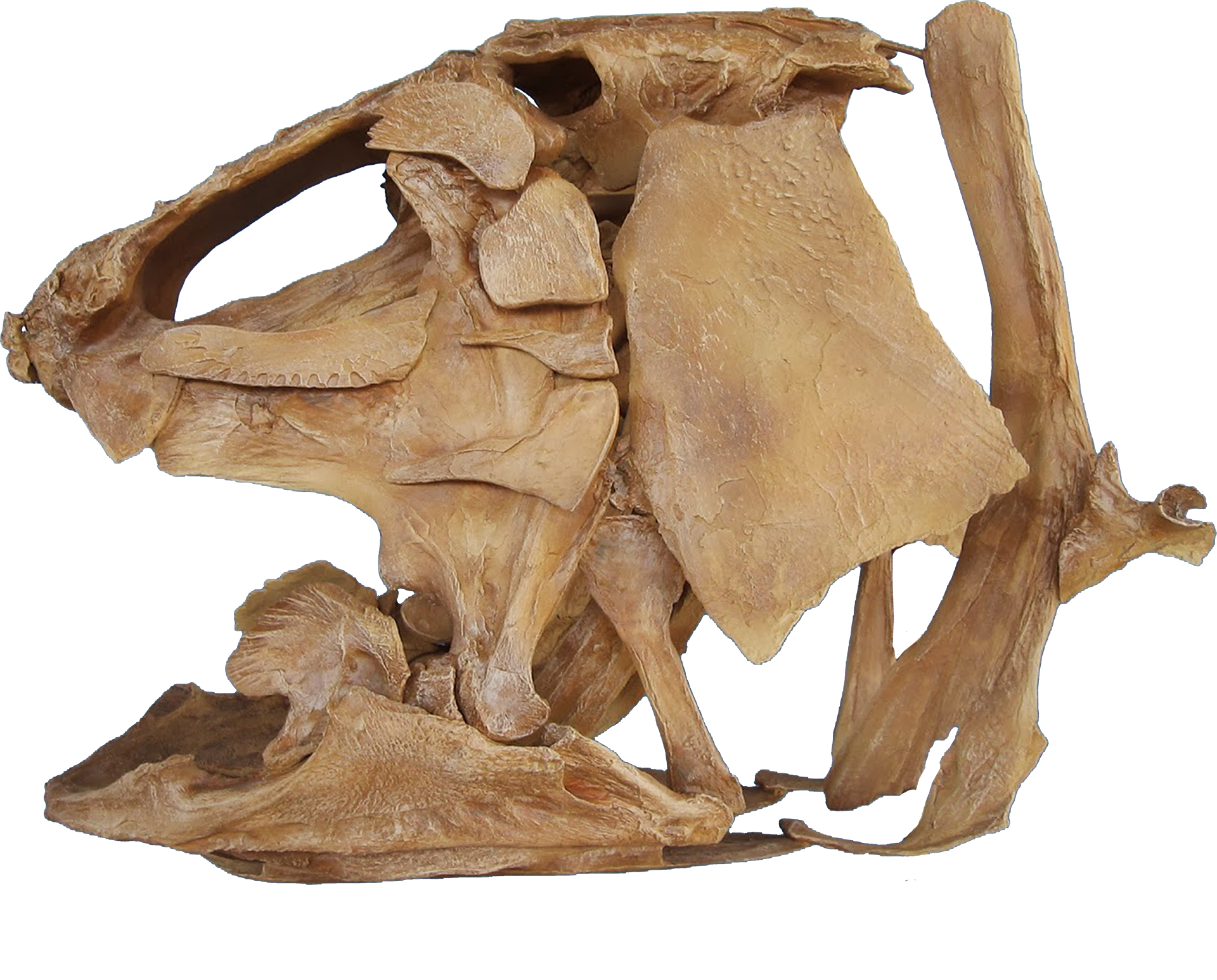
- Fossilized skull of the Late Cretceous coelacanth fish Megalocoelacanthus
  †Megalocoelacanthus
  - †Megalocoelacanthus dobiei
- †Micrabacia
  - †Micrabacia marylandica
  - †Micrabacia radiata
- †Micreschara – tentative report
- †Microdontaspis – type locality for genus
  - †Microdontaspis tenuis – type locality for species

†Modiolus

  - †Modiolus sedesclaris
  - †Modiolus sedesclarus
- †Molaspora
  - †Molaspora lobata
- †Morea
  - †Morea marylandica
  - †Morea transenna
- †Myobarbum
  - †Myobarbum laevigatum
- Myrtea
  - †Myrtea stephensoni

== N ==
- †Napulus
  - †Napulus octoliratus
- †Nemodon
  - †Nemodon eufalensis
  - †Nemodon eufaulensis
  - †Nemodon grandis – or unidentified comparable form
- Nerita
- †Noferinia – type locality for genus
  - †Noferinia fusicarpa – type locality for species
- Nozeba
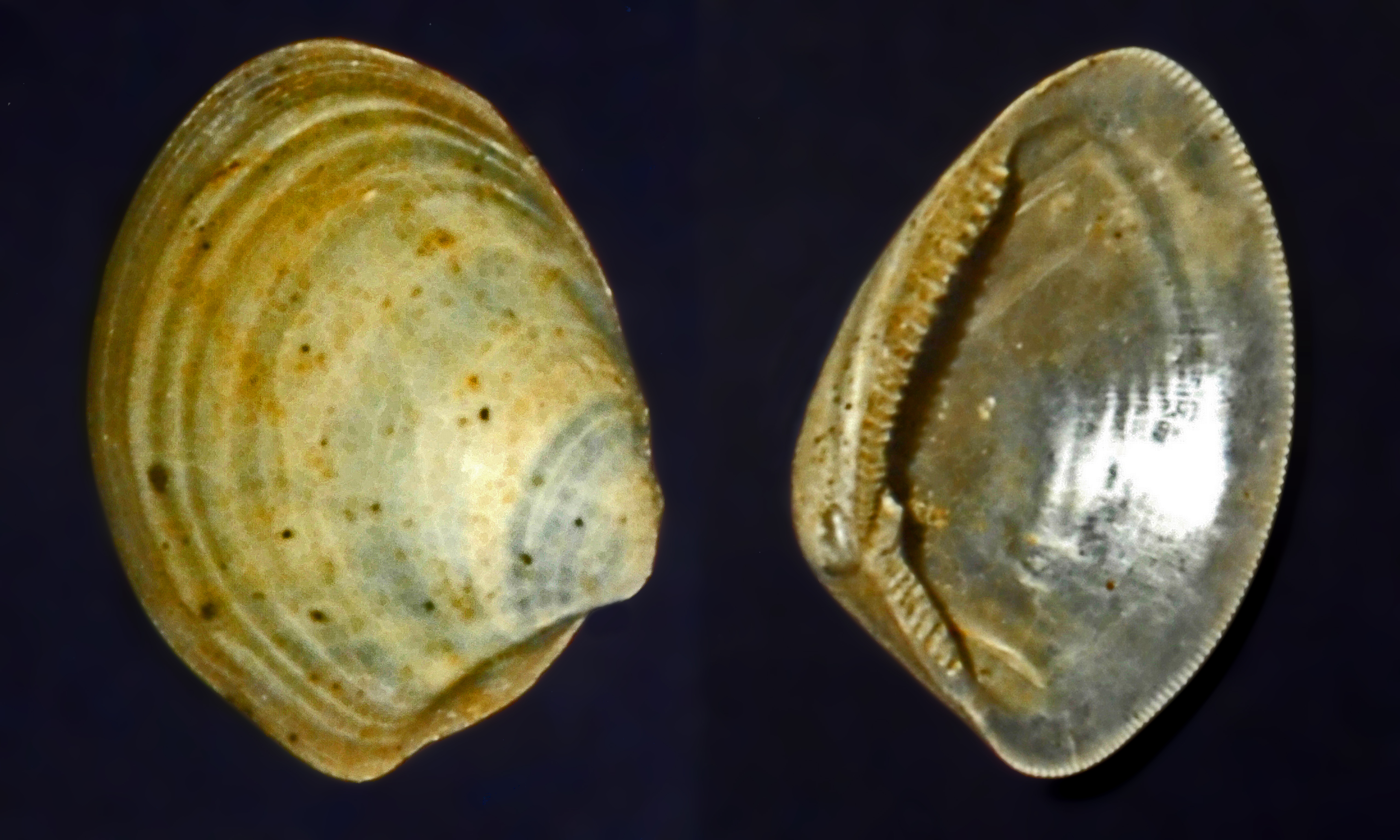
- Interior of a fossilized shell of the Early Ordovician-modern marine bivalve Nucula
  Nucula
  - †Nucula camia
  - †Nucula cuneifrons
  - †Nucula percrassa
  - †Nucula severnensis
- Nuculana
  - †Nuculana rostratruncata
  - †Nuculana whitfieldi
- †Nymphalucina
  - †Nymphalucina linearia

== O ==
- †Odontobasis
- †Opertochasma
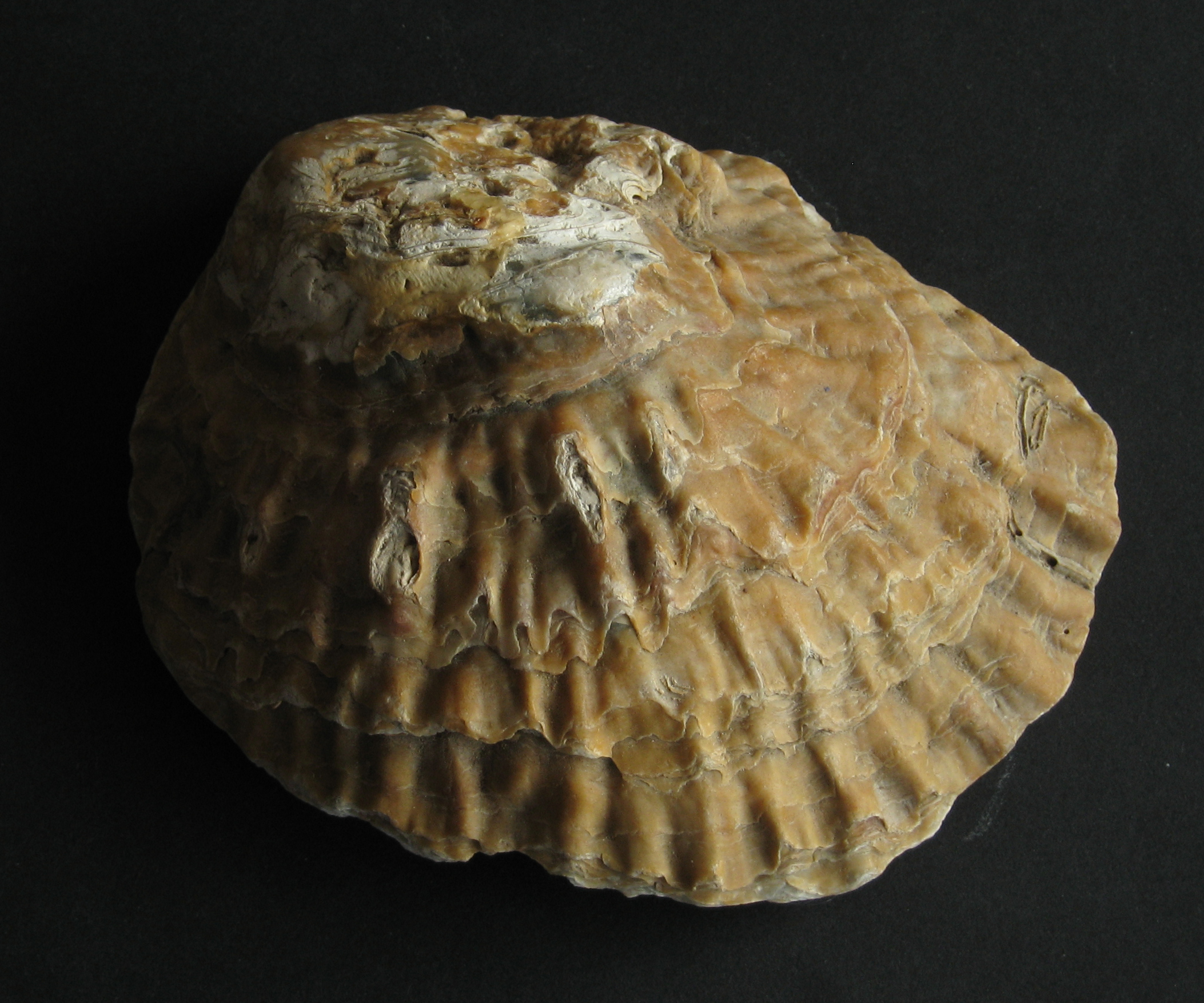
- Shell of an Ostrea, or oyster
  Ostrea

== P ==
- †Paladmete
  - †Paladmete cancellaria
  - †Paladmete gardnerae
  - †Paladmete laevis
- Panopea
  - †Panopea subplicata
- †Parafusus
- †Paralbula
  - †Paralbula casei
- † Paranomia
  - †Paranomia scabra
- †Parasaurauia – type locality for genus
  - †Parasaurauia allonensis – type locality for species
- †Parmicorbula
  - †Parmicorbula percompressa
  - †Parmicorbula suffalciata
  - †Parmicorbula terramaria
- †Periplomya
- †Perrisonota
  - †Perrisonota protexta
- Phacoides
  - †Phacoides mattiformis
- Pholadomya
- †Pinna
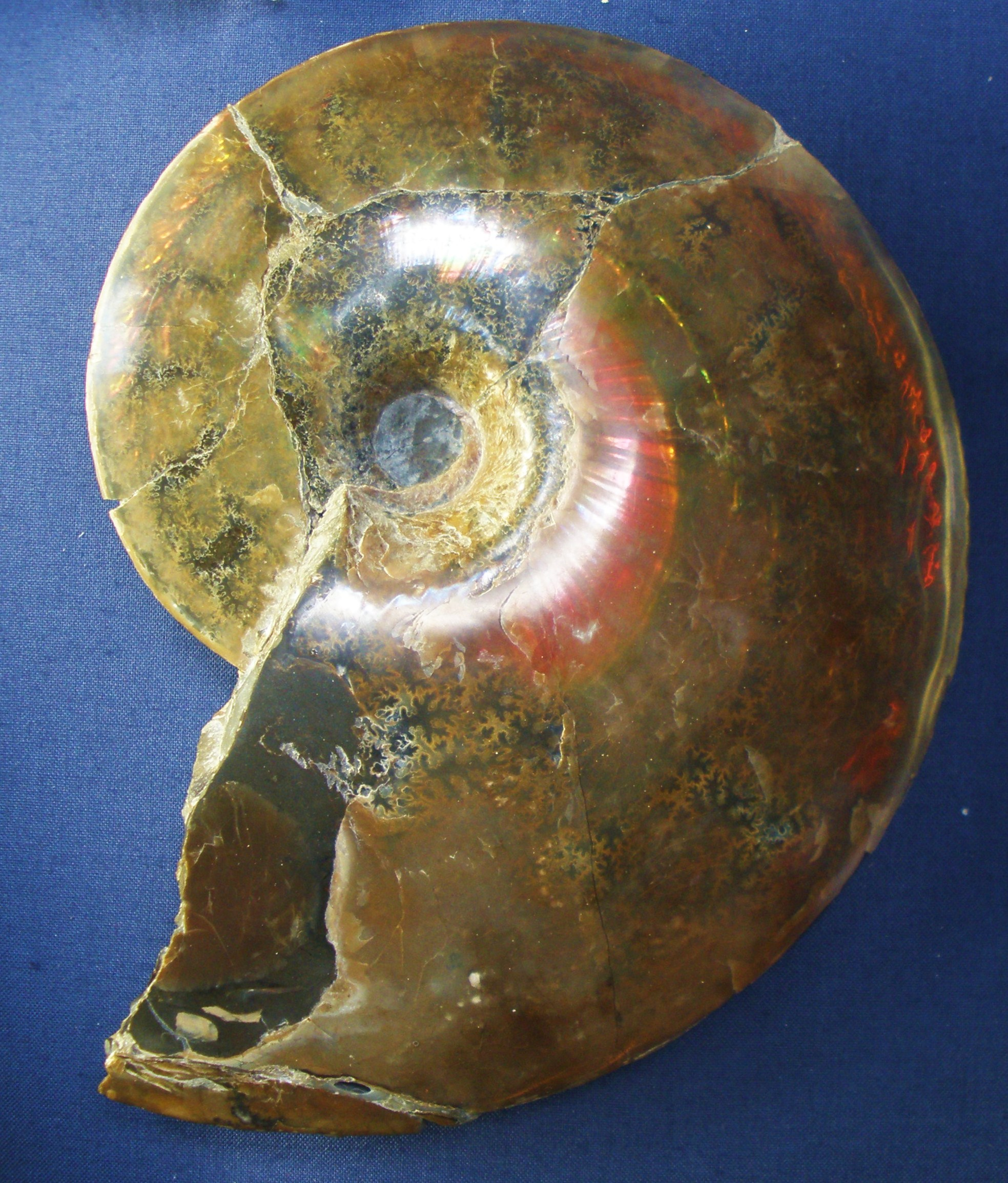
- Fossilized shell of the Late Cretaceous ammonoid cephalopod Placenticeras
  †Placenticeras
  - †Placenticeras benningi
- †Platecarpus
- †Pleuriocardia
  - †Pleuriocardia eufalensis
- Polinices
  - †Polinices kummeli
- †Postligata
  - †Postligata wordeni
- †Praeleda
  - †Praeleda compar
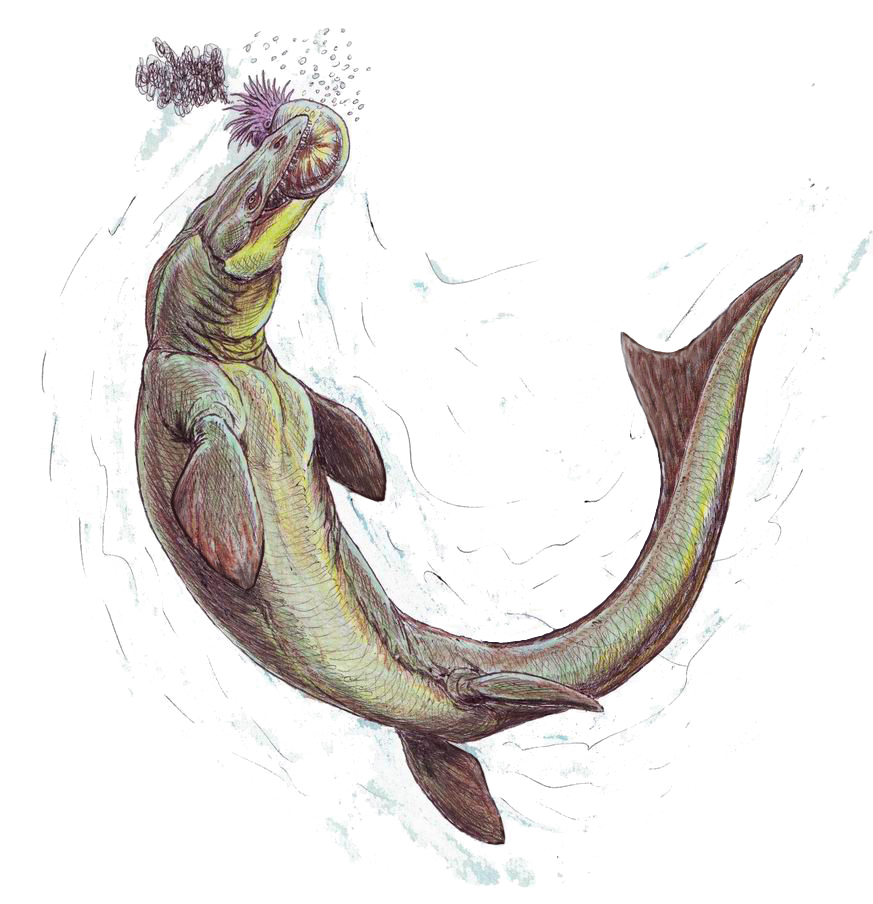
- Life restoration of the Late Cretaceous mosasaur Prognathodon preying upon an ammonoid cephalopod
  †Prognathodon
- †Promathildia
  - †Promathildia parvula – or unidentified comparable form
- †Protarca
  - †Protarca obliqua
- †Protocardia
  - †Protocardia spillmani
- †Protofagacea – type locality for genus
  - †Protofagacea allonensis – type locality for species
- †Protoplatyrhina
  - †Protoplatyrhina renae
- †Pseudocorax
  - †Pseudocorax affinis
  - †Pseudocorax granti
- †Pseudohypolophus
  - †Pseudohypolophus ellipsis – type locality for species
- †Pseudolimea
  - †Pseudolimea reticulata
- Pseudomalaxis
  - †Pseudomalaxis stantoni
- †Pseudoptera
  - †Pseudoptera securiformis
- †Pteria
  - †Pteria rhombica
- †Pteridophyte
  - †Pteridophyte Type 1 – informal
  - †Pteridophyte Type 2 – informal
- †Pterocerella
  - †Pterocerella tippana
- †Pterotrigonia
  - †Pterotrigonia angulicostata
  - †Pterotrigonia cerulea
  - †Pterotrigonia eufalensis
  - †Pterotrigonia eufaulensis
- †Ptychodus
  - †Ptychodus mortoni
- †Ptychosyca
  - †Ptychosyca inornata
- †Ptychotrygon
  - †Ptychotrygon chattahoocheensis – type locality for species
  - †Ptychotrygon eutawensis – type locality for species
  - †Ptychotrygon triangularis – or unidentified comparable form
  - †Ptychotrygon vermiculata
- †Pugnellus
  - †Pugnellus goldmani
- Pulvinites
  - †Pulvinites argenteus
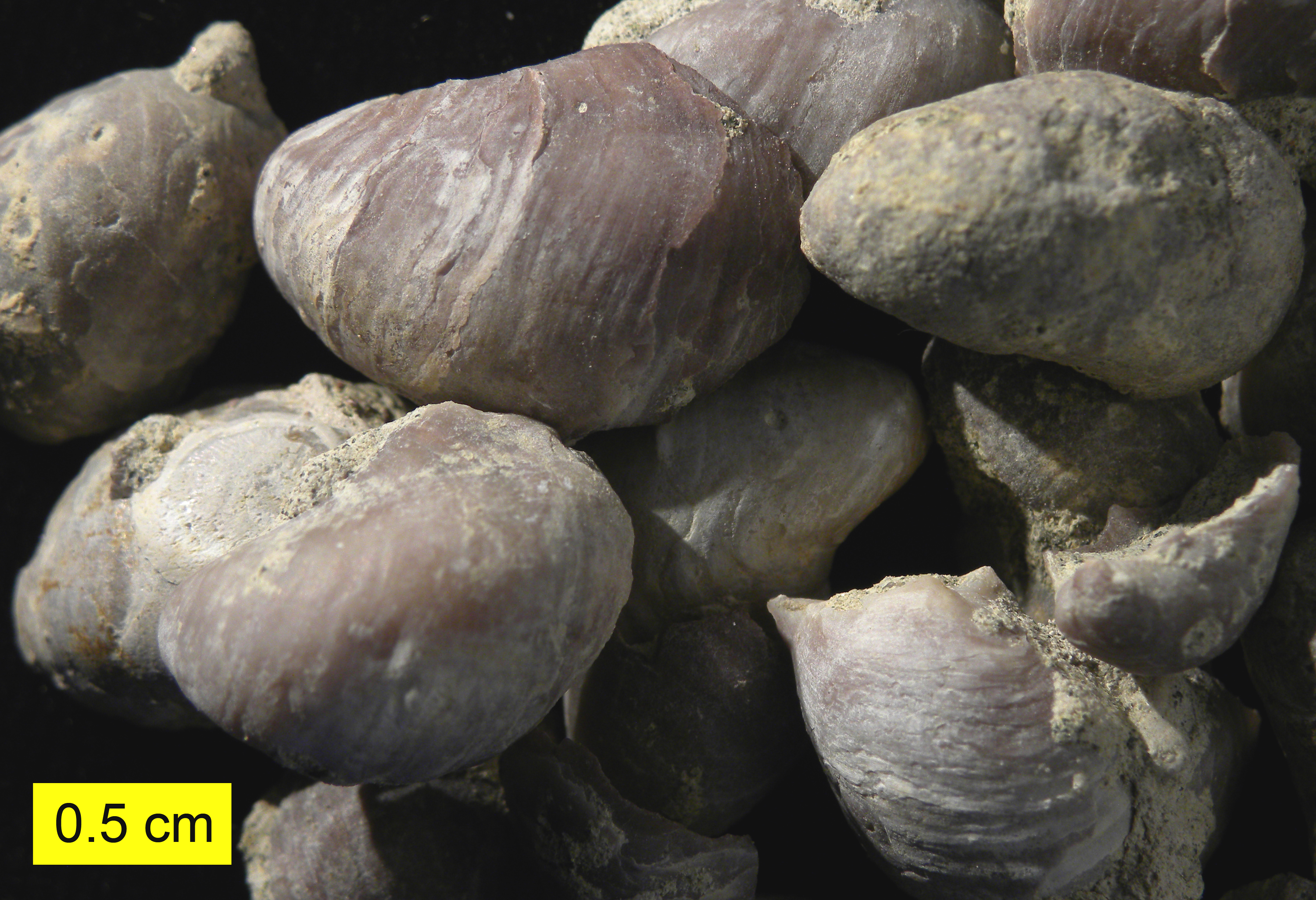
- Assemblage of fossilized shells of the Cretaceous-Pleistocene oyster Pycnodonte
  Pycnodonte
  - †Pycnodonte vesicularis
- †Pyrifusus
- †Pyropsis

== Q ==
- †Quadriplatanus – type locality for genus
  - †Quadriplatanus georgianus – type locality for species

== R ==
- †Radiopecten
  - †Radiopecten mississippiensis
- †Regnellidium
  - †Regnellidium upatoiensis – type locality for species
- †Remera
  - †Remera flexicostata
  - †Remera juncea
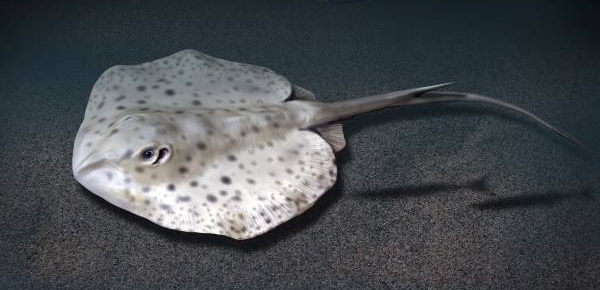
- Restoration of the Late Cretaceous-Paleocene ray Rhombodus
  †Rhombodus
  - †Rhombodus laevis
- Ringicula
  - †Ringicula clarki
  - †Ringicula culbertsoni
- Rissoa

== S ==
- †Scambula
  - †Scambula perplana
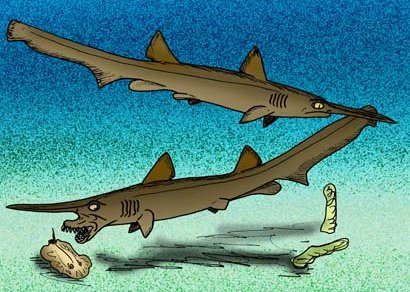
- Restoration of several of the Early Cretaceous-Miocene shark Scapanorhynchus
  †Scapanorhynchus
  - †Scapanorhynchus rhaphiodon
  - †Scapanorhynchus texanus
- †Scobinidola
- Seila
  - †Seila quadrilira – or unidentified related form
- Serpula
- †Solariorbis
  - †Solariorbis clara
- †Solyma
  - †Solyma elliptica
- †Sourimis
  - †Sourimis georgiana – tentative report
- †Sphenodiscus
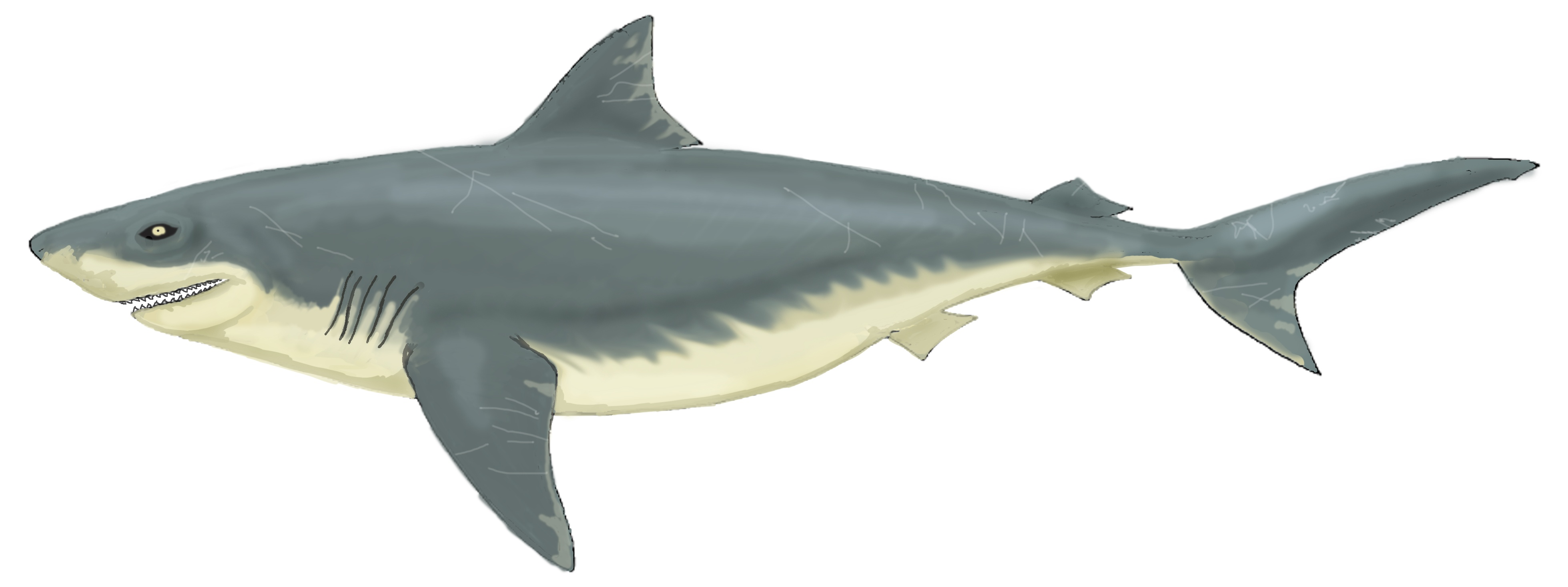
- Life restoration of the Late Cretaceous shark Squalicorax
  Squalicorax
  - †Squalicorax falcatus
  - †Squalicorax kaupi
  - †Squalicorax yangaensis
- Squatina
  - †Squatina hassei
- †Stantonella
  - †Stantonella interrupta
- †Stephanodus
- Striarca
  - †Striarca cuneata
  - †Striarca richardsi
  - †Striarca saffordi
- †Syncyclonema
  - †Syncyclonema simplicius
- †Synodontaspis
  - †Synodontaspis holmdelensis

== T ==
- Teinostoma
- Tellina
- †Tellinimera
  - †Tellinimera buboana
  - †Tellinimera gabbi
- †Tenea
  - †Tenea parilis
- †Tenuipteria
  - †Tenuipteria argentea
  - †Tenuipteria argenteus
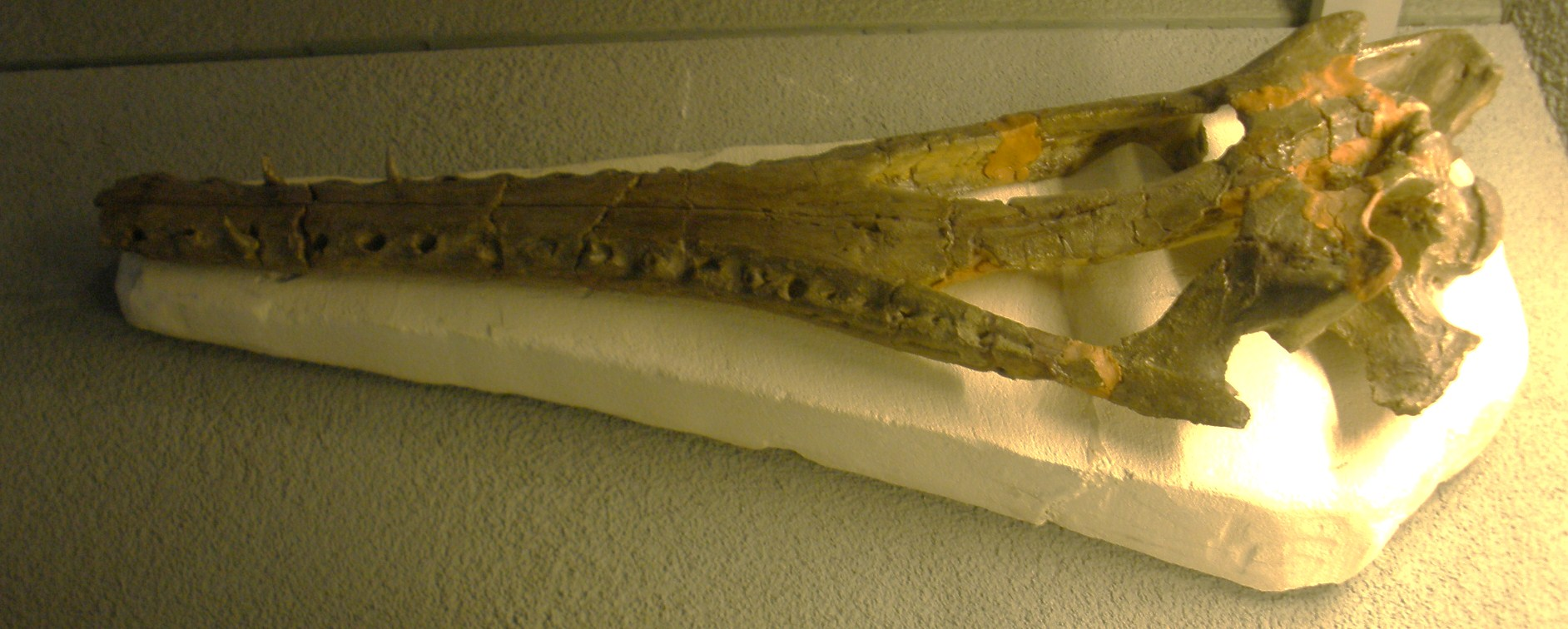
- Fossilized skull of the Late Cretaceous-Paleocene gavial relative Thoracosaurus
  †Thoracosaurus
  - †Thoracosaurus neocesariensis
- †Thylacus
  - †Thylacus cretaceus
- †Tornatellaea
- Trachycardium
  - †Trachycardium eufaulensis
- †Trigonarca
- Trochocyathus
  - †Trochocyathus woolmani
- †Troostella – tentative report
- Turboella
  - †Turboella crebricostata
  - †Turboella tallahatchiensis
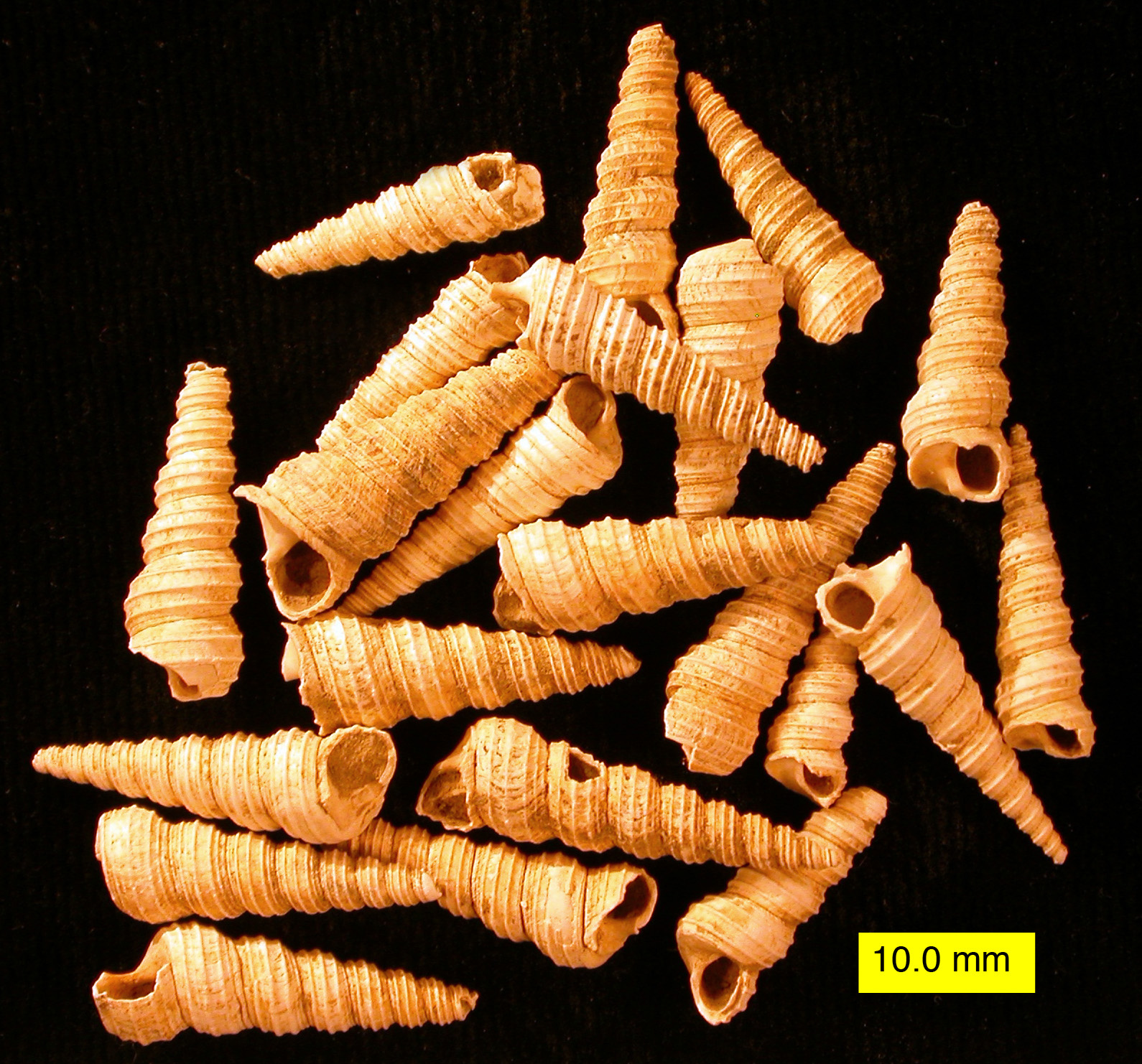
- Fossilized shells of the Late Jurassic-modern tower snail Turritella
  Turritella
  - †Turritella bilira
  - †Turritella hilgardi
  - †Turritella trilira
  - †Turritella vertebroides

== U ==
- †Uddenia
- †Unicardium
  - †Unicardium concentricum
- †Urceolabrum

== V ==
- †Veniella
  - †Veniella conradi
  - †Veniella mullinensis
- †Vetericardiella
  - †Vetericardiella crenalirata
- †Volutomorpha
- Volvulella

== X ==
- Xenophora
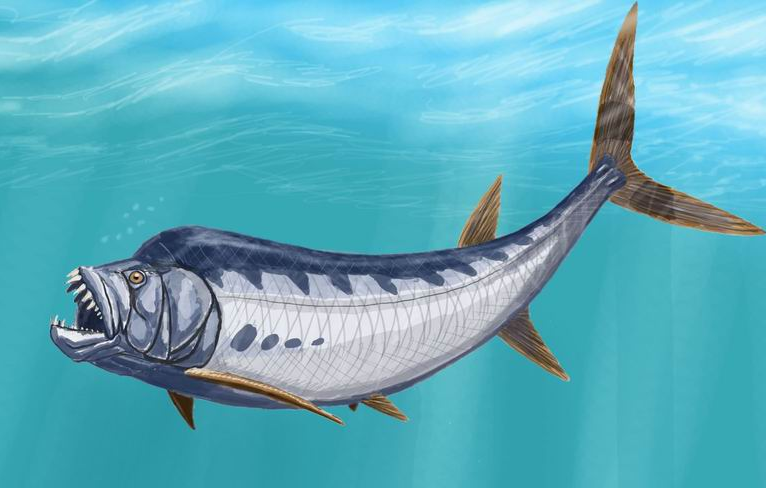
- Life restoration of the Cretaceous bony fish Xiphactinus
  †Xiphactinus
  - †Xiphactinus audax

== Z ==
- †Zikkuratia
  - †Zikkuratia tabanneensis
