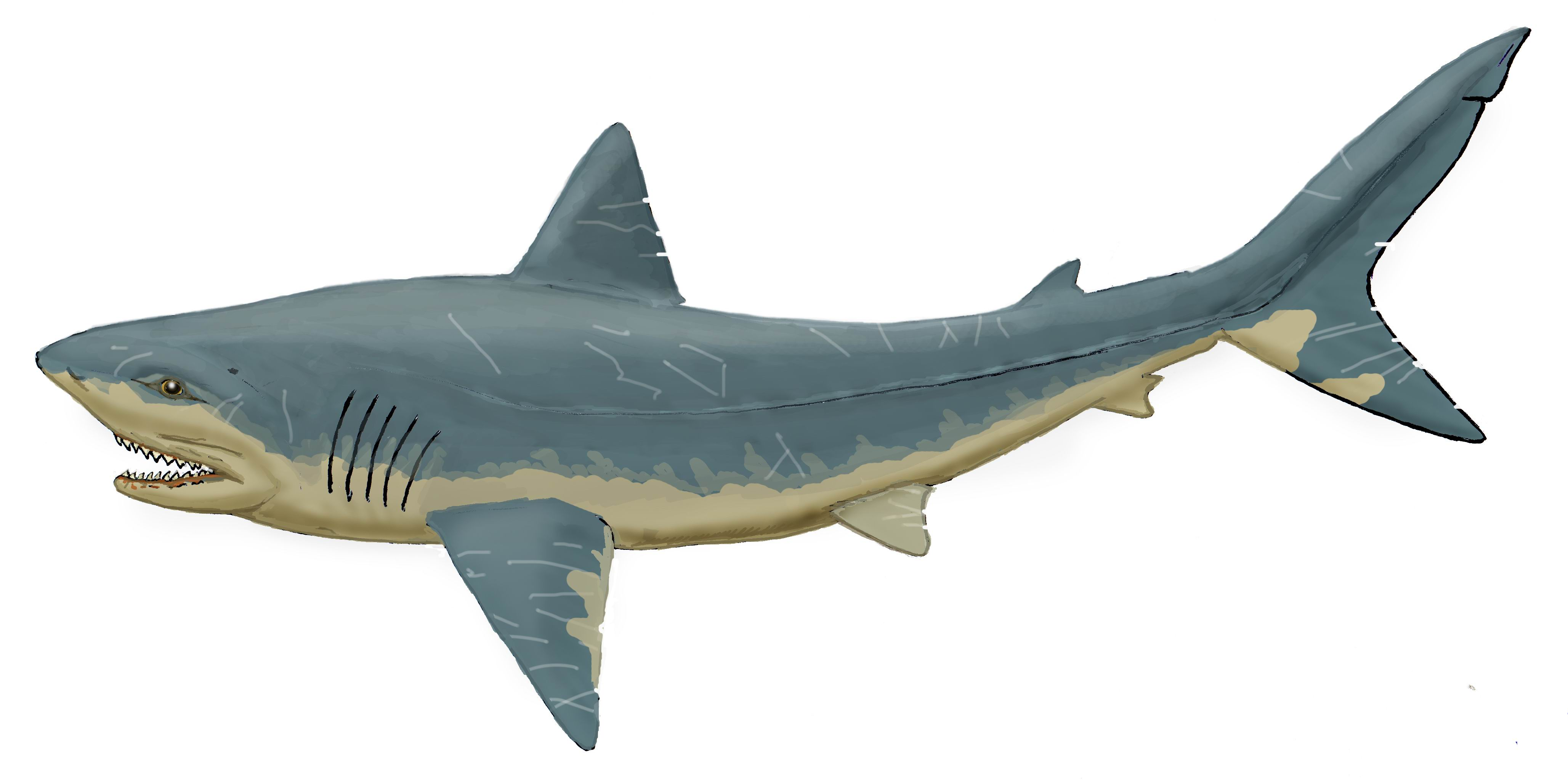
- Squalicorax

Scientific classification
- Kingdom: Animalia
- Phylum: Chordata
- Class: Chondrichthyes
- Subclass: Elasmobranchii
- Division: Selachii
- Order: Lamniformes
- Family: †Anacoracidae; Casier, 1947

Genera
- †Nanocorax; †Ptychocorax; †Scindocorax; †Squalicorax

Synonyms
- Squalicoracidae Patterson in Andrews, Gardiner, Miles, & Patterson, 1967; Ptychocoracidae Herman & Van Waes, 2012

= Anacoracidae =

Anacoracidae Temporal range: Albian-Maastrichtian

Extinct family of sharks

Anacoracidae is a family of extinct mackerel sharks that lived during the Cretaceous. It includes four valid genera: Nanocorax, Ptychocorax, Scindocorax, and Squalicorax. Two previously-included genera, Galeocorax and Pseudocorax, were reassigned to the family Pseudocoracidae.
