= Nanocorax =

Nanocorax Temporal range: Cenomanian-Campanian

Scientific classification
- Domain: Eukaryota
- Kingdom: Animalia
- Phylum: Chordata
- Class: Chondrichthyes
- Subclass: Elasmobranchii
- Division: Selachii
- Order: Lamniformes
- Family: †Anacoracidae
- Genus: †Nanocorax; Cappetta, 2012

Type species
- †Nanocorax crassus (Cappetta & Case, 1975)

Other species
- †Nanocorax microserratodon (Shimada, 2008)

Synonyms
- Genus synonymy: Microcorax Cappetta & Case, 1975 (preoccupied by Microcorax Sharpe, 1877); Species synonymy: N. crassus; Microcorax crassus Cappetta & Case, 1975 N. microserratodon; Squalicorax microserratodon Shimada, 2008

Extinct genus of sharks

Nanocorax is an extinct genus of mackerel sharks that lived during the Late Cretaceous. It contains two valid species, N. crassus and N. microserratodon. It has been found in North America, Europe, North Africa, and the Middle East.
