= Ptychocorax =

Ptychocorax Temporal range: Coniacian-Campanian

Scientific classification
- Domain: Eukaryota
- Kingdom: Animalia
- Phylum: Chordata
- Class: Chondrichthyes
- Subclass: Elasmobranchii
- Division: Selachii
- Order: Lamniformes
- Family: †Anacoracidae
- Genus: †Ptychocorax; Glickman & Istchenko in Glickman, 1980

Type species
- †Ptychocorax dolloi (Leriche, 1929)

Other species
- †Ptychocorax aulaticus Glickman & Istchenko in Glickman, 1980; †Ptychocorax hybodontoides Glickman & Istchenko in Glickman, 1980

Synonyms
- Genus synonymy: Phychocorax Glickman & Istchenko in Glickman, 1980 (lapsus calami); Ptachocorax Glickman & Istchenko in Glickman, 1980 (lapsus calami); Hermanodus Landemaine, 1991; Species synonymy: P. dolloi; Acrodus (Palaeobates) dolloi Leriche, 1929; Hermanodus dolloi (Leriche, 1929)

Extinct genus of sharks

Ptychocorax is an extinct genus of mackerel sharks that lived during the Late Cretaceous. It contains three valid species that have been found in Europe and Asia. It was originally identified as a hybodontiform, but was later reidentified as an anacoracid. It has also been considered to belong to its own family, Ptychocoracidae. Ptychocorax is characterized by its unique dentition, combining Squalicorax-like, cutting anterior teeth with Ptychodus-like, crushing posterior teeth.
