= Scindocorax =

Scindocorax Temporal range: Santonian

Scientific classification
- Domain: Eukaryota
- Kingdom: Animalia
- Phylum: Chordata
- Class: Chondrichthyes
- Subclass: Elasmobranchii
- Division: Selachii
- Order: Lamniformes
- Family: †Anacoracidae
- Genus: †Scindocorax; Bourdon, Wright, Lucas, Spielmann, & Pence, 2011
- Species: †S. novimexicanus

Binomial name
- †Scindocorax novimexicanus Bourdon, Wright, Lucas, Spielmann, & Pence, 2011

Extinct genus of sharks

Scindocorax is an extinct genus of mackerel sharks that lived during the Late Cretaceous. It contains a single valid species, S. novimexicanus, from the Point Lookout Sandstone of New Mexico.
