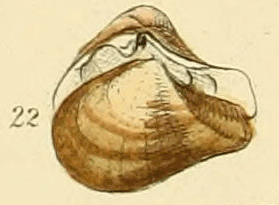

Scientific classification
- Domain: Eukaryota
- Kingdom: Animalia
- Phylum: Mollusca
- Class: Bivalvia
- Order: Myida
- Family: Corbulidae
- Genus: Varicorbula
- Species: V. gibba

Binomial name
- Varicorbula gibba (Olivi, 1792)

Synonyms
- Aloidis gibba; (Olivi, 1792) Corbula (Varicorbula) gibba (Olivi, 1792); Corbula curta Locard, 1886; Corbula gibba (Olivi, 1792); Corbula gibba var. albida Bucquoy, Dautzenberg & Dollfus, 1896; Corbula gibba var. fusca Bucquoy, Dautzenberg & Dollfus, 1896; Corbula gibba var. maxima Bucquoy, Dautzenberg & Dollfus, 1896; Corbula gibba var. radiata Bucquoy, Dautzenberg & Dollfus, 1896; Corbula haastiana Hutton, 1878; Corbula mactriformis Biondi Giunti, 1859; Corbula nucleus Lamarck, 1818; Corbula ovata Forbes, 1838; Corbula rosea T. Brown, 1844; Corbula striata J. Fleming, 1828; Mya inaequivalvis Montagu, 1803; Tellina gibba Olivi, 1792; Tellina naticuta Brusina, 1870

= Varicorbula gibba =

Species of molluscs

Varicorbula gibba, the common basket-shell, is a species of bivalve in the family Corbulidae.

== Taxonomy ==
The species was originally described in 1792 by the Italian zoologist Giuseppe Olivi under the protonym of Tellina gibba. Some databases (e.g. SeaLifeBase) continue to classify it under the genus Corbula.

== Description ==
The shell of Varicorbula gibba can measure up to 11 mm (0.43 in).

Right and left valve of the same specimen:

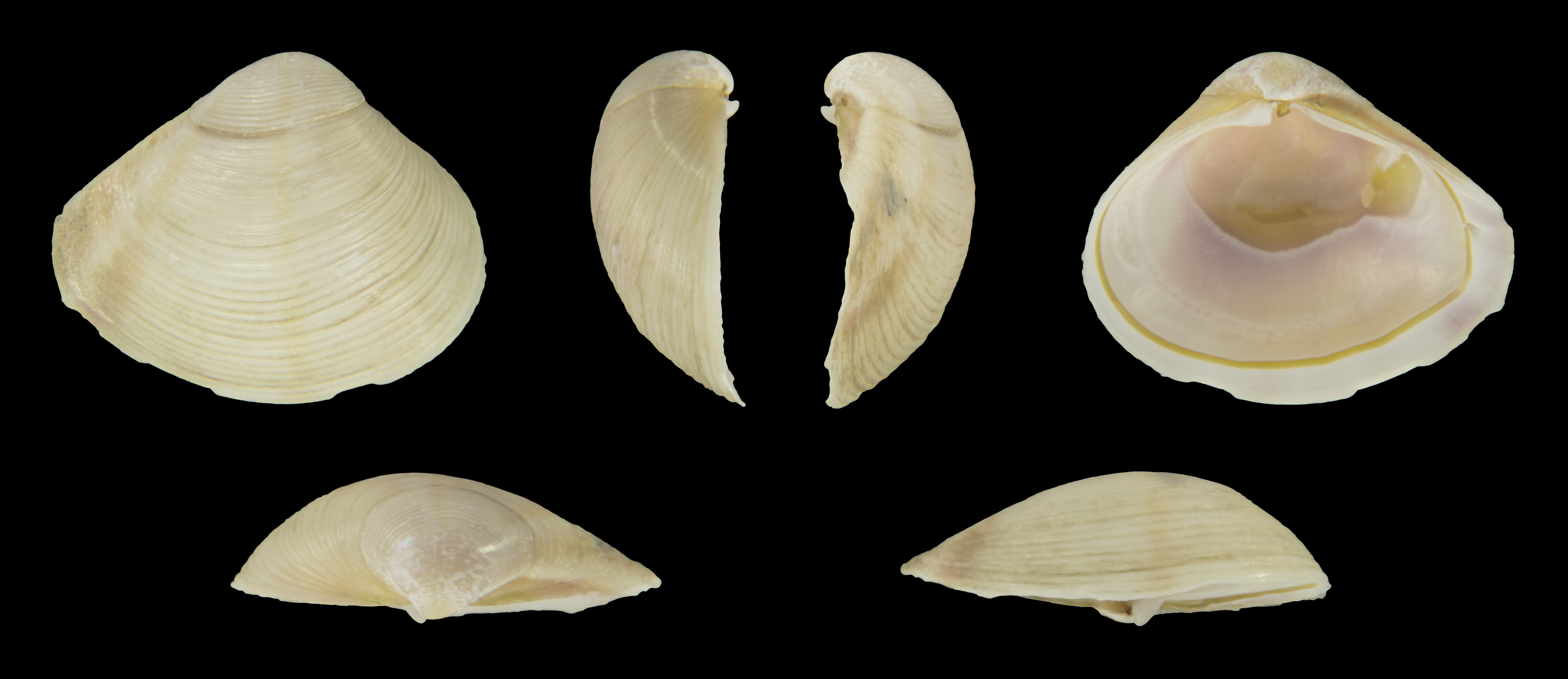
Right valve

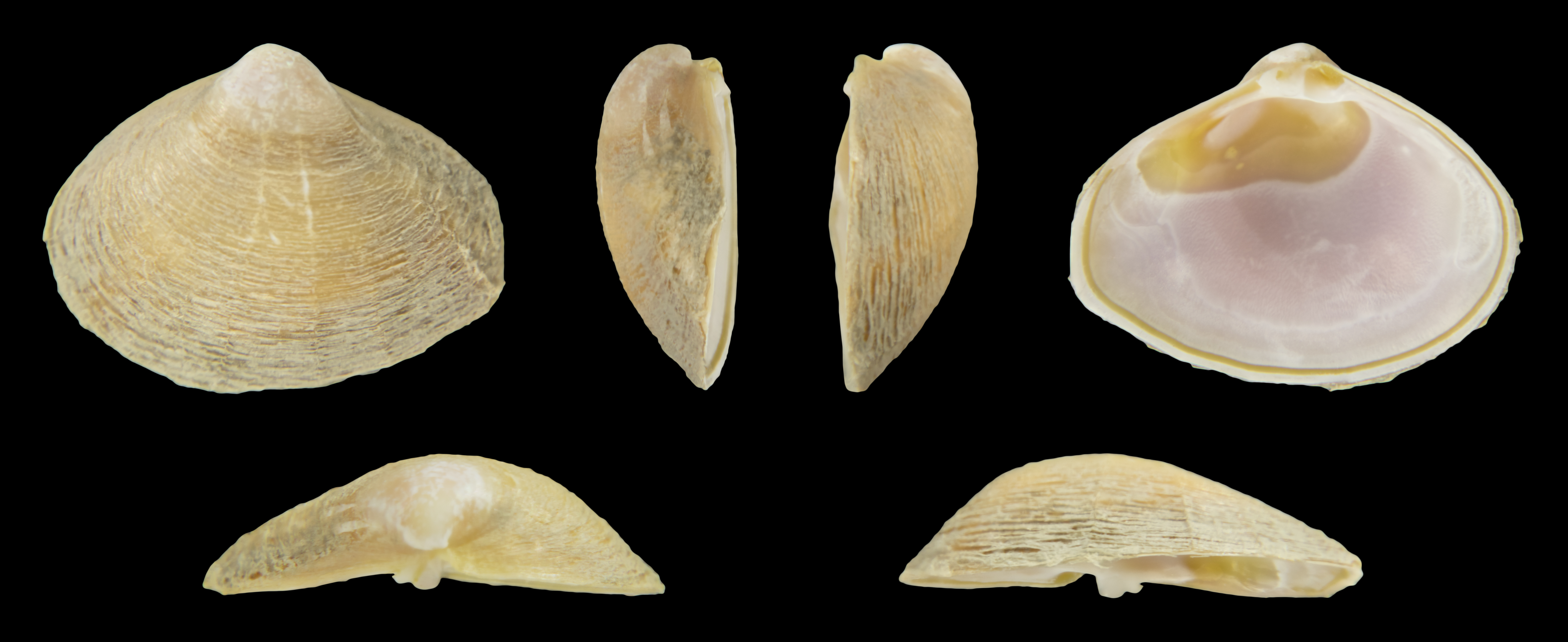
Left valve

== Distribution and habitat ==
Varicorbula gibba is a marine species which occurs in Europe in the north-eastern Atlantic Ocean and the Mediterranean. It has been introduced to Australia. The species occurs from sea level to a maximum depth of 25 m (82 ft) on sandbanks and areas rich with detritus.
