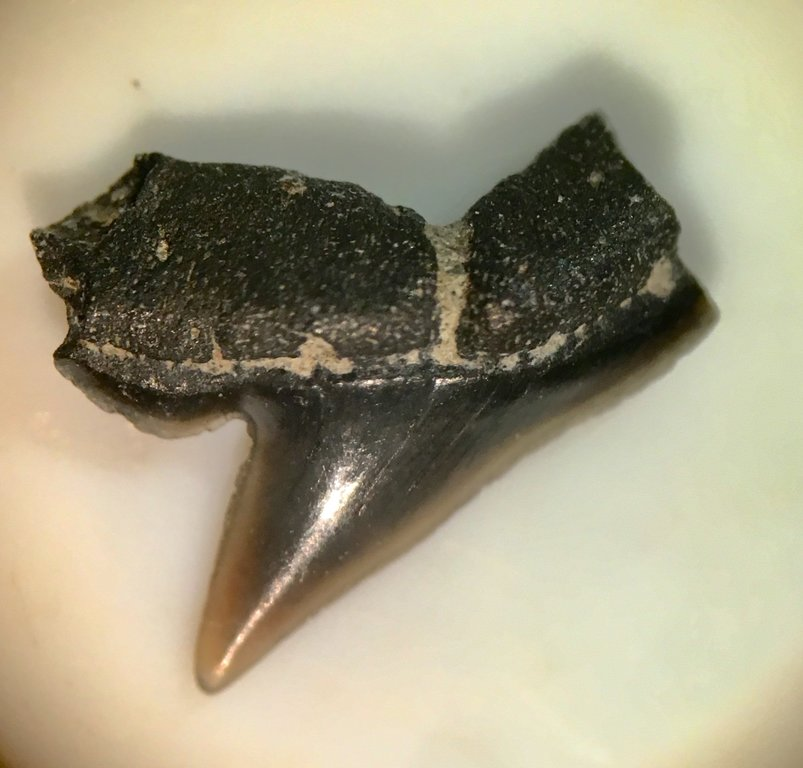
- Tooth of P. granti

Scientific classification
- Kingdom: Animalia
- Phylum: Chordata
- Class: Chondrichthyes
- Subclass: Elasmobranchii
- Division: Selachii
- Order: Lamniformes
- Family: †Pseudocoracidae
- Genus: †Pseudocorax; Priem, 1897

Type species
- †Pseudocorax affinis (Münster in Agassiz, 1843)

Other species
- †Pseudocorax heteromorphus (Reuss, 1845); †Pseudocorax laevis Leriche, 1906; †Pseudocorax granti Cappetta & Case, 1975; †Pseudocorax duchaussoisi Guinot, Underwood, Cappetta, & Ward, 2013; †Pseudocorax kindlimanni Jambura, Stumpf, & Kriwet, 2021; †Pseudocorax heteroserratus Egli, Goode, Rempert & Rego, 2025

Synonyms
- Species synonymy: P. affinis; Corax affinis Münster in Agassiz, 1843; Corax planus Agassiz, 1843; Pseudocorax planus (Agassiz, 1843) P. heteromorphus; Oxyrhina heteromorpha Reuss, 1845; Scoliodon priscus Reuss, 1845 P. laevis; Pseudocorax affinis var. laevis Leriche, 1906

= Pseudocorax =

Pseudocorax Temporal range: Cenomanian-Maastrichtian

Extinct genus of sharks

Pseudocorax is an extinct genus of mackerel sharks that lived during the Late Cretaceous. It contains six valid species that have been found in Europe, the Middle East, North Africa, and North America. It was formerly assigned to the family Anacoracidae, but is now placed in its own family Pseudocoracidae along with Galeocorax. The former species "P." australis and "P." primulus have been reidentified as species of Echinorhinus and Squalicorax, respectively.
