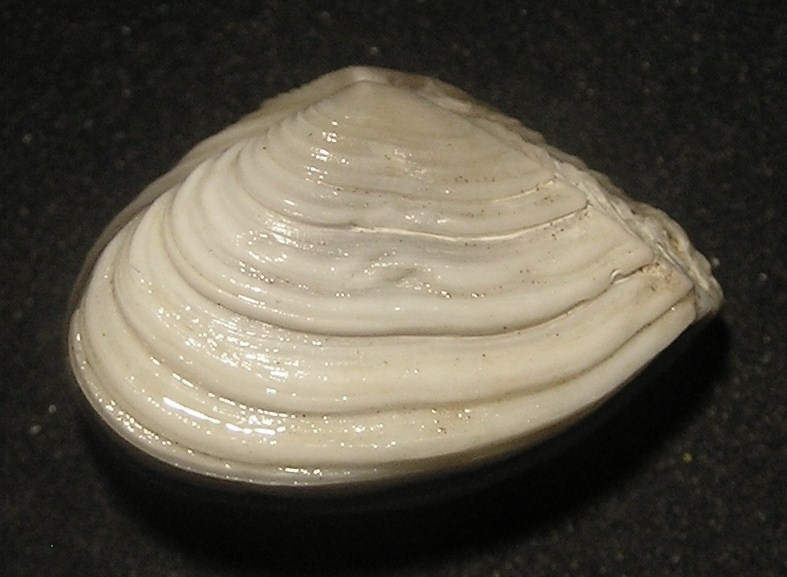
- Corbula modesta

Scientific classification
- Kingdom: Animalia
- Phylum: Mollusca
- Class: Bivalvia
- Order: Myida
- Superfamily: Myoidea
- Family: Corbulidae; Lamarck, 1818

Genera
- See text.

= Corbulidae =

Family of bivalves

Corbulidae is a family of very small saltwater clams, marine bivalve molluscs in the order Myida.

== Genera and species ==
Genera and species in the family Corbulidae include:

- Anisocorbula Iredale, 1930
- Apachecorbula Olivera, 2014
  - Apachecorbula muriatica Olivera, 2014
- Caestocorbula Vincent, 1910
- Caryocorbula Bruguiere, 1792
  - Caryocorbula porcella (Dall, 1916)
- Corbula Bruguiere, 1797
  - Corbula alabamiensis Lea, 1833
  - Corbula barrattiana C. B. Adams, 1852
  - Corbula bicarinata (Sowerby, 1833)
  - Corbula biradiata (Sowerby, 1833)
  - Corbula caribaea
  - Corbula chittyana C. B. Adams, 1852
  - Corbula contracta Say, 1822
  - Corbula cubaniana d'Orbigny, 1842
  - Corbula cymella Dall, 1881
  - Corbula dietziana C. B. Adams, 1852
  - Corbula kelseyi Dall, 1916
  - Corbula krebsiana C. B. Adams, 1852
  - Corbula luteola Carpenter, 1864
  - Corbula nasuta Sowerby, 1833
  - Corbula nuciformis Sowerby, 1833
  - Corbula porcella Dall, 1916
  - Corbula sulcata
  - Corbula swiftiana C. B. Adams, 1852
  - Corbula zelandica Quoy and Gaimard, 1835
- Cuneocorbula Cossmann, 1886
- Erodona Bosc, 1801
- Hexacorbula Olsson, 1932
- Juliacorbula Olsson and Harbison, 1953
  - Juliacorbula cubaniana (d'Orbigny, 1842)
  - Juliacorbula luteola (Carpenter, 1864)
- Lentidium de Cristofori & Jan, 1832
- Panamicorbula Pilsbry, 1932
- Potamocorbula Habe, 1955
  - Potamocorbula amurensis (Schrenck, 1861)
- Tenuicorbula Olsson, 1932
- Varicorbula Grant and Gale, 1931
  - Varicorbula gibba (Olivi, 1792)
  - Varicorbula operculata (Philippi, 1848)
