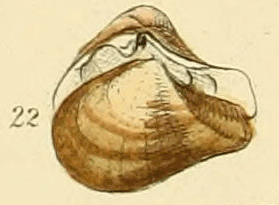
- Varicorbula gibba

Scientific classification
- Domain: Eukaryota
- Kingdom: Animalia
- Phylum: Mollusca
- Class: Bivalvia
- Order: Myida
- Family: Corbulidae
- Genus: Varicorbula; Grant & Gale, 1931

Species
- See text

= Varicorbula =

Genus of saltwater clams

Varicorbula is a genus of saltwater clams in the family Corbulidae.

== Species ==
- Varicorbula gibba (Olivi, 1792)
- Varicorbula operculata (Philippi, 1848)
