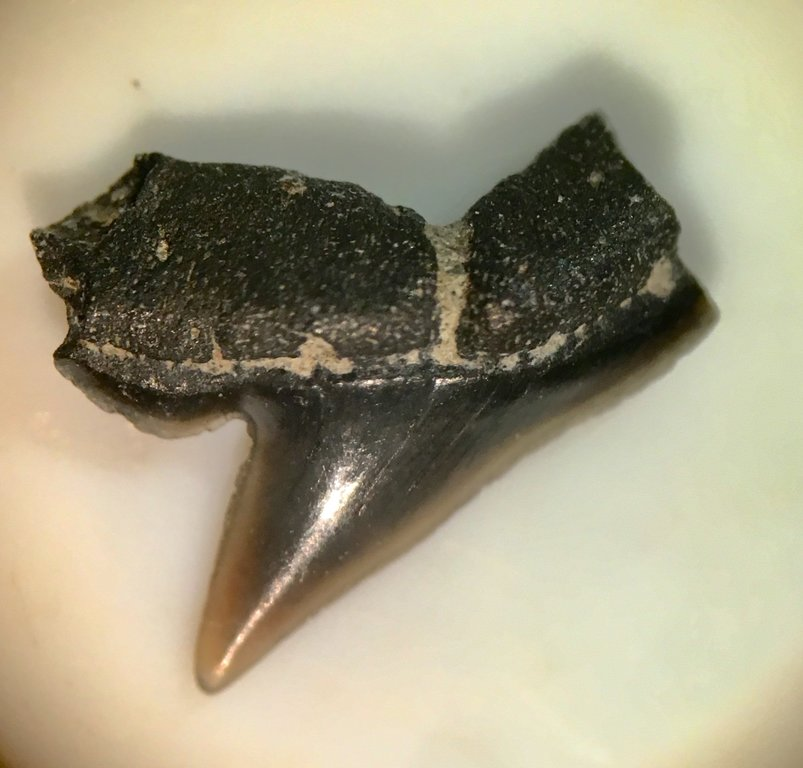
- Tooth of Pseudocorax granti

Scientific classification
- Kingdom: Animalia
- Phylum: Chordata
- Class: Chondrichthyes
- Subclass: Elasmobranchii
- Division: Selachii
- Order: Lamniformes
- Family: †Pseudocoracidae; Cappetta, 2012

Genera
- †Galeocorax; †Pseudocorax

= Pseudocoracidae =

Pseudocoracidae Temporal range: Cenomanian-Maastrichtian

Extinct family of sharks

Pseudocoracidae is a family of extinct mackerel sharks that lived during the Late Cretaceous. It includes two genera, Galeocorax and Pseudocorax.
