= Agerostrea =

Agerostrea Temporal range: Late Cretaceous
- Fossil shell of Agerostrea ungulata from Madagascar. Maastrichtian

Scientific classification
- Kingdom: Animalia
- Phylum: Mollusca
- Class: Bivalvia
- Order: Ostreida
- Family: Ostreidae
- Genus: †Agerostrea; Vialov, 1936

Extinct genus of bivalves

Agerostrea is an extinct genus of fossil oysters, marine bivalve molluscs in the family Ostreidae, the true oysters. It is present in the Maastrichtian, the upper stage of the Late Cretaceous epoch, from 72.1 to 66 million years ago.

== Species ==
Species within the genus Agerostrea:

- †Agerostrea densicostata Sobetski 1982
- †Agerostrea dentiformis Kassab 1998
- †Agerostrea falcata Morton 1827
- †Agerostrea kopajevitshi Sobetski 1982
- †Agerostrea lunata Woods, 1912
- †Agerostrea luppovi
- †Agerostrea mesenterica Morton, 1834
- †Agerostrea monmouthensis
- †Agerostrea nasuta
- †Agerostrea negevensis Lewy 1996
- †Agerostrea rouxi
- †Agerostrea ungulata (von Schlotheim 1813)
