= Caestocorbula =

Scientific classification
- Kingdom: Animalia
- Phylum: Mollusca
- Class: Bivalvia
- Order: Myida
- Family: Corbulidae
- Genus: Caestocorbula; Vincent, 1910

Species
- †Caestocorbula anceps Maxwell, 1992; †Caestocorbula elegans J. de C. Sowerby; †Caestocorbula gigantica Roy & Mukherjee, 2017; †Caestocorbula praeviator Maxwell, 1992; †Caestocorbula gujaratensis Halder & Bano, 2015

Extinct genus of bivalves

Caestocorbula is an extinct genus of saltwater clams in the family Corbulidae. The name has been created for fossils from the Eocene of Belgium.
