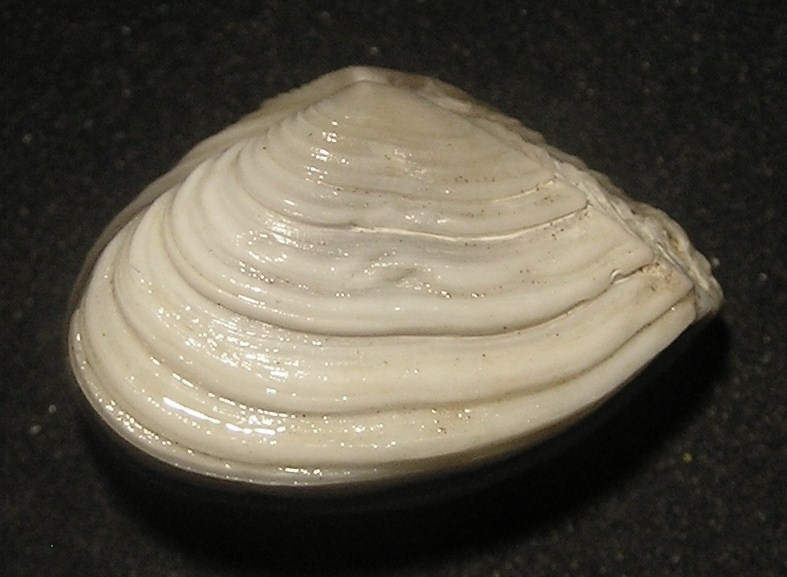
- A live but retracted individual of Corbula modesta

Scientific classification
- Kingdom: Animalia
- Phylum: Mollusca
- Class: Bivalvia
- Order: Myida
- Family: Corbulidae
- Genus: Corbula; Bruguière, 1797

Species
- See text

= Corbula =

Corbula Temporal range: Cretaceous–Present

Genus of bivalves

Corbula is a genus of very small saltwater clams, marine bivalve molluscs in the family Corbulidae, the basket clams.

== Species ==
Species within the genus Corbula include:

- Corbula aequivalvis Philippi, 1836
- Corbula albuginosa Hinds, 1843
- Corbula amethystina (Olsson, 1961)
- Corbula arcaeformis Lynge, 1909
- Corbula barrattiana C. B. Adams, 1852
- Corbula bicarinata (Sowerby, 1833)
- Corbula biradiata (Sowerby, 1833)
- Corbula cadenati (Nicklès, 1955)
- Corbula chittyana C. B. Adams, 1852
- Corbula colimensis Coan, 2002
- Corbula contracta Say, 1822
- Corbula crispa Reeve, 1844
- Corbula cymella Dall, 1881
- Corbula dautzenbergi Lamy, 1941
- Corbula densesculpta Thiele & Jaeckel, 1931
- Corbula dietziana C. B. Adams, 1852
- Corbula erythraeensis H. Adams, 1871
- Corbula erythrodon Lamarck, 1818
- Corbula esmeralda (Olsson, 1961)
- Corbula fortisulcata E.A. Smith, 1879
- Corbula gibba (Olivi, 1792)
- Corbula granum Cosel, 1995
- Corbula grovesi Coan, 2002
- Corbula hydropica (Iredale, 1930)
- Corbula ira Dall, 1908
- Corbula laticostata Lamy, 1941
- Corbula limatula Conrad, 1846
- Corbula lineata Lynge, 1909
- Corbula luteola Carpenter, 1864
- Corbula lyrata Sastry & Mamgain, 1971
- Corbula macgillivrayi E.A. Smith, 1885
- Corbula marmorata Hinds, 1843
- Corbula modesta Hinds
- Corbula monilis Hinds, 1843
- Corbula moretonensis Lamprell & Healy, 1997
- Corbula nasuta Sowerby, 1833
- Corbula niasensis Thiele & Jaeckel, 1931
- Corbula nipponica (Habe, 1961)
- Corbula obesa Hinds, 1843
- Corbula operculata Philippi, 1848
- Corbula otra Coan, 2002
- Corbula ovalina Lamarck, 1818
- Corbula ovulata G.B. Sowerby I, 1833
- Corbula pallida Reeve, 1843
- Corbula patagonica d'Orbigny, 1845
- Corbula persica E.A. Smith, 1906
- Corbula philippii E.A. Smith, 1885
- Corbula physoides Deshayes, 1848
- Corbula porcella Dall, 1916
- Corbula pulchella Philippi, 1893
- Corbula rotalis Hinds, 1843
- Corbula rugifera Smith
- Corbula scaphoides Hinds, 1843
- Corbula sinensis Bernard, Cai & Morton, 1993
- Corbula smithiana Brazier, 1880
- Corbula solidula Hinds, 1843
- Corbula speciosa Reeve, 1843
- Corbula stephensoni Lamprell & Healy, 1997
- Corbula striatissima Lamy, 1941
- Corbula subquadrata Melvill & Standen, 1907
- Corbula sulcata Lamarck, 1801
- Corbula sulcosa
- Corbula sulculosa H. Adams, 1870
- Corbula swiftiana C. B. Adams, 1852
- Corbula taitensis Lamarck, 1818
- Corbula tenuis G.B. Sowerby I, 1833
- Corbula tryoni E.A. Smith, 1880
- Corbula tunicata Reeve, 1843
- Corbula uruguayensis W. B. Marshall, 1928
- Corbula venusta Gould, 1861
- Corbula yokoyamai (Habe, 1949)
- Corbula zelandica Quoy and Gaimard, 1835

The database ITIS also gives the following species

- Corbula alabamiensis Lea, 1833
- Corbula caribaea
- Corbula cubaniana d'Orbigny, 1842
- Corbula kelseyi Dall, 1916
- Corbula krebsiana C. B. Adams, 1852
- Corbula nuciformis Sowerby, 1833
