= Galeocorax =

Galeocorax Temporal range: Turonian-Maastrichtian

Scientific classification
- Kingdom: Animalia
- Phylum: Chordata
- Class: Chondrichthyes
- Subclass: Elasmobranchii
- Division: Selachii
- Order: Lamniformes
- Family: †Pseudocoracidae
- Genus: †Galeocorax; Cappetta, 2012

Type species
- †Galeocorax jaekeli (Woodward, 1895)

Synonyms
- Genus synonymy: Paracorax Cappetta, 1977 (preoccupied by Paracorax Lambrecht, 1933); Eugaleocerdo Herman & Van Waes, 2012; Species synonymy: Galeocerdo jaekeli Woodward, 1895; Corax jaekeli (Woodward, 1895); Paracorax jaekeli (Woodward, 1895); Eugaleocerdo jaekeli (Woodward, 1895); Paracorax unilateralis Averianov, 1997

Extinct genus of sharks

Galeocorax is an extinct genus of mackerel sharks that lived during the Late Cretaceous. It contains a single valid species, G. jaekeli, that has been found in Europe and North America.
