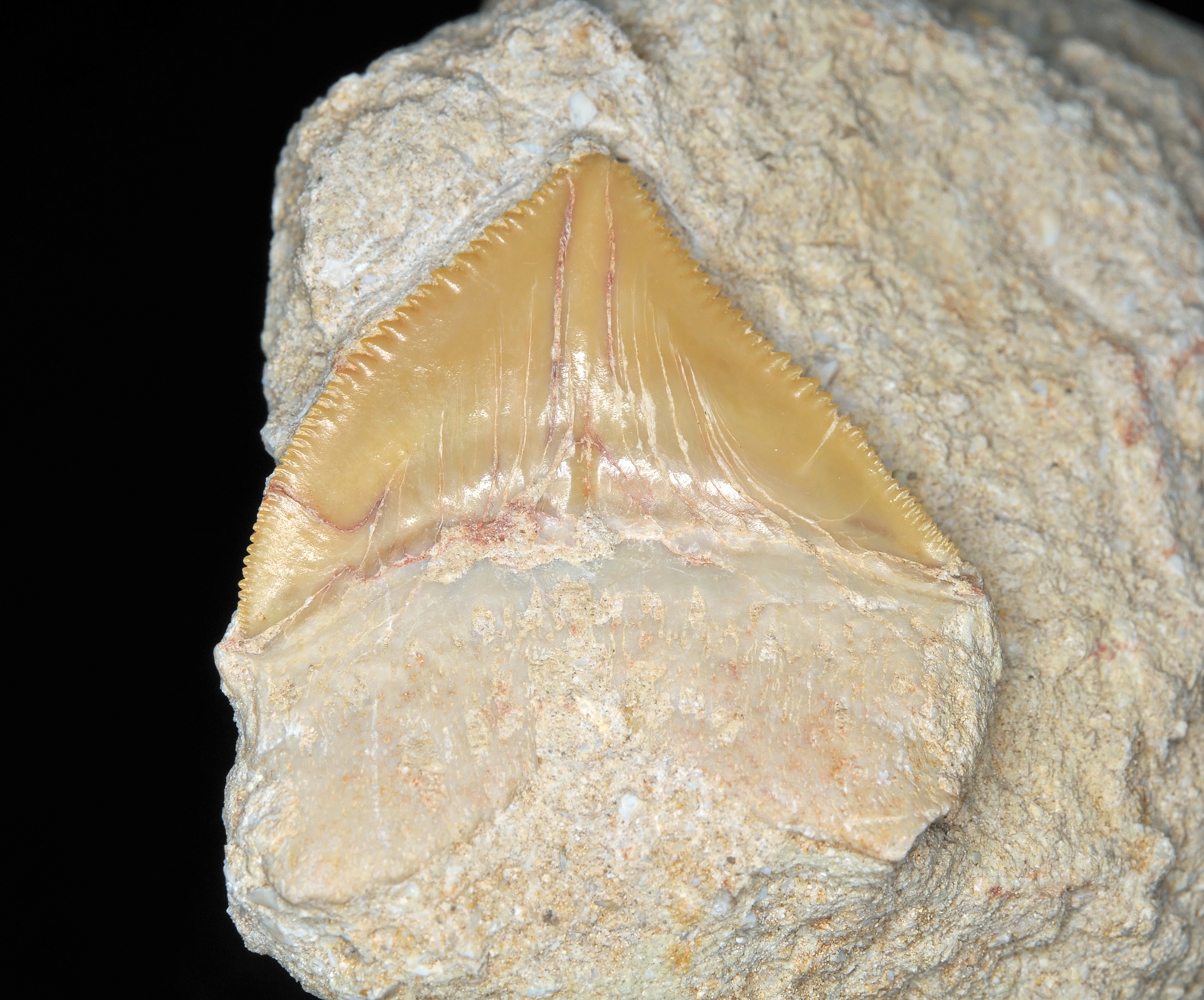
- Squalicorax pristodontus tooth from the late Maastrichtian of Khouribga, Morocco

Scientific classification
- Kingdom: Animalia
- Phylum: Chordata
- Class: Chondrichthyes
- Subclass: Elasmobranchii
- Division: Selachii
- Order: Lamniformes
- Family: †Anacoracidae
- Genus: †Squalicorax; Whitley, 1939

Type species
- †Squalicorax pristodontus Agassiz, 1835

Species
- List of species: †S. pristodontus Agassiz, 1835 (type); †S. appendiculatus Agassiz, 1839; †S. falcatus Agassiz, 1843; †S. falcatus praecursor Sokolov, 1978; †S. kaupi Agassiz, 1843; †S. heterodon Reuss, 1845; †S. obliquus Reuss, 1845; †S. obliquus subserratus Glückman, 1980; †S. lindstromi Davis, 1890; †S. curvatus Williston, 1900; †S. bassanii Gemmellaro, 1920; †S. baharijensis Stromer, 1927; †S. primaevus Dalinkevicius, 1935; †S. kugleri Leriche, 1938; †S. yangaensis Carteville & Casier, 1943; †S. dalinkevichiusi Glückman & Shvazhaite, 1971; †S. mississippiensis Glückman, 1971; †S. volgensis Glückman, 1971; †S. obruchevi Glückman, 1980; †S. sagisicus Glückman, 1980; †S. santonicus Glückman & Zhelezko, 1980; †S. papulovi Zhelezko, 1980; †S. africanus Cappetta, 1991; †S. primigenius Landemaine, 1991; †S. coquandi Vullo et al., 2007; †S. priscoserratus Siversson et al., 2007; †S. bernardezi Guinot et al., 2013; †S. benguerirensis Cappetta et al., 2014; †S. microserratus Cappetta et al., 2014; †S. deckeri Bice & Shimada, 2016; †S. lalunaensis Guinot & Carrillo-Briceño, 2018; †S. moodyi Guinot & Carrillo-Briceño, 2018; †S. acutus Siversson et al., 2019; †S. bazzii Siversson et al., 2019; †S. mutabilis Siversson et al., 2019

= Squalicorax =

Squalicorax Temporal range: Albian-Maastrichtian, 109.56–66.0 Ma

Extinct genus of sharks

Squalicorax, commonly known as the crow shark, is a genus of extinct lamniform shark known to have lived during the Cretaceous period. The genus had a global distribution in the Late Cretaceous epoch. Multiple species within this genus are considered to be wastebasket taxa due to morphological similarities in the teeth.

== Etymology ==
The name Squalicorax is derived from the Latin squalus for shark and the Greek κόραξ, "korax" for raven.

== Description ==
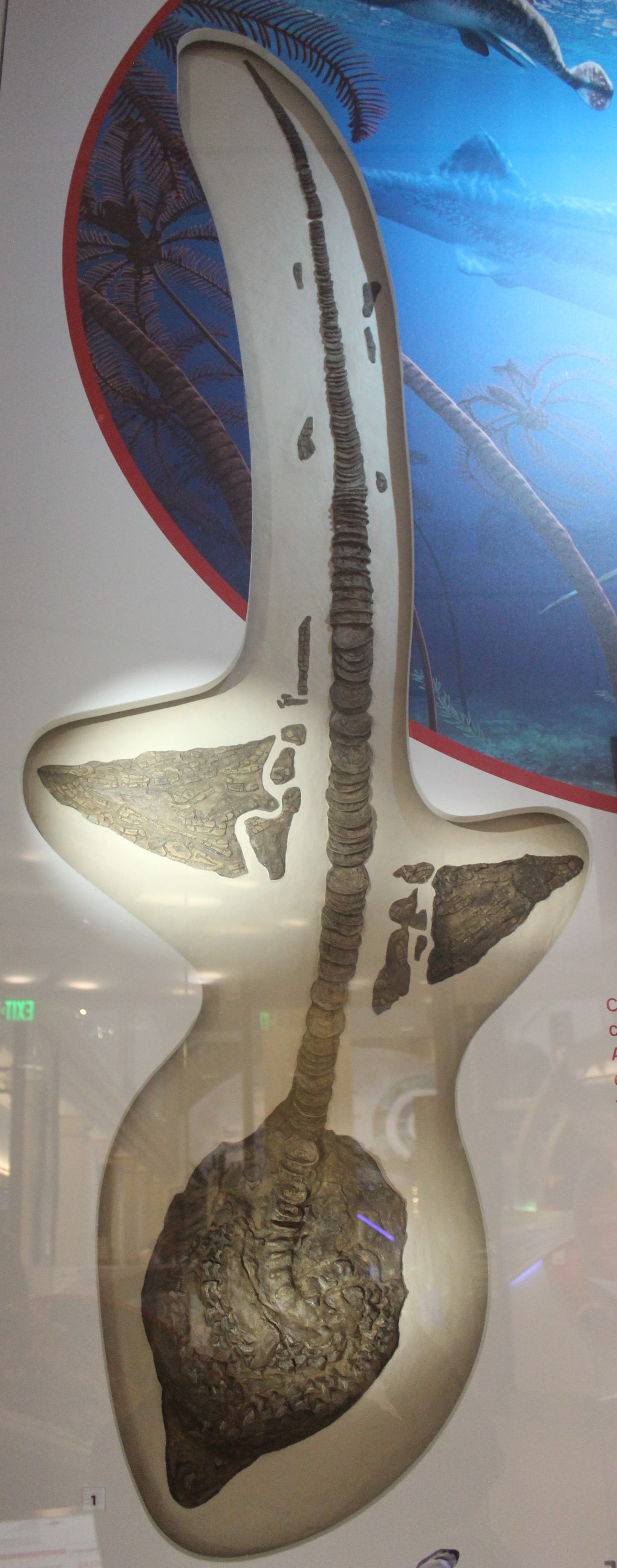
Near-complete skeleton of Squalicorax falcatus (USNM 425665)

Squalicorax was a medium-sized shark, typically measuring about 1.8–3 metres (5.9–9.8 ft) long. The largest specimen of S. pristodontus, SDSM 47683, was significantly larger, measuring up to 4.8 metres (16 ft) long.

Their bodies were similar to the modern gray reef sharks, but the shape of the teeth is strikingly similar to that of a tiger shark. The teeth are numerous, relatively small, with a curved crown and serrated, up to 2.5–3 cm (0.98–1.18 in) in height. Large numbers of fossil teeth have been found in Europe, North Africa, and North America. Squalicorax is one of three Cretaceous lamniformes to garner serrations along with Pseudocorax and Galeocorax. The world's largest and most complete semi-articulated fossil of Squalicorax was found in 2014 in stores of the Canadian Fossil Discovery Centre in Morden, Manitoba, in Canada, where it is now displayed. It measures more than 3 m in length.

Squalicorax was a coastal predator and scavenger, as evidenced by a Squalicorax tooth found embedded in the metatarsal (foot) bone of a terrestrial hadrosaurid dinosaur that most likely died on land and ended up in the water. Other food sources included sea turtles, mosasaurs, ichthyodectid fish, and other marine life. Tooth marks from this shark have also been found on the bones of Pteranodon, but whether the shark actively snatched such large pterosaurs out of the air, attacked them as they dove after prey, or were simply scavenging is not known.

=== Description of selected species ===
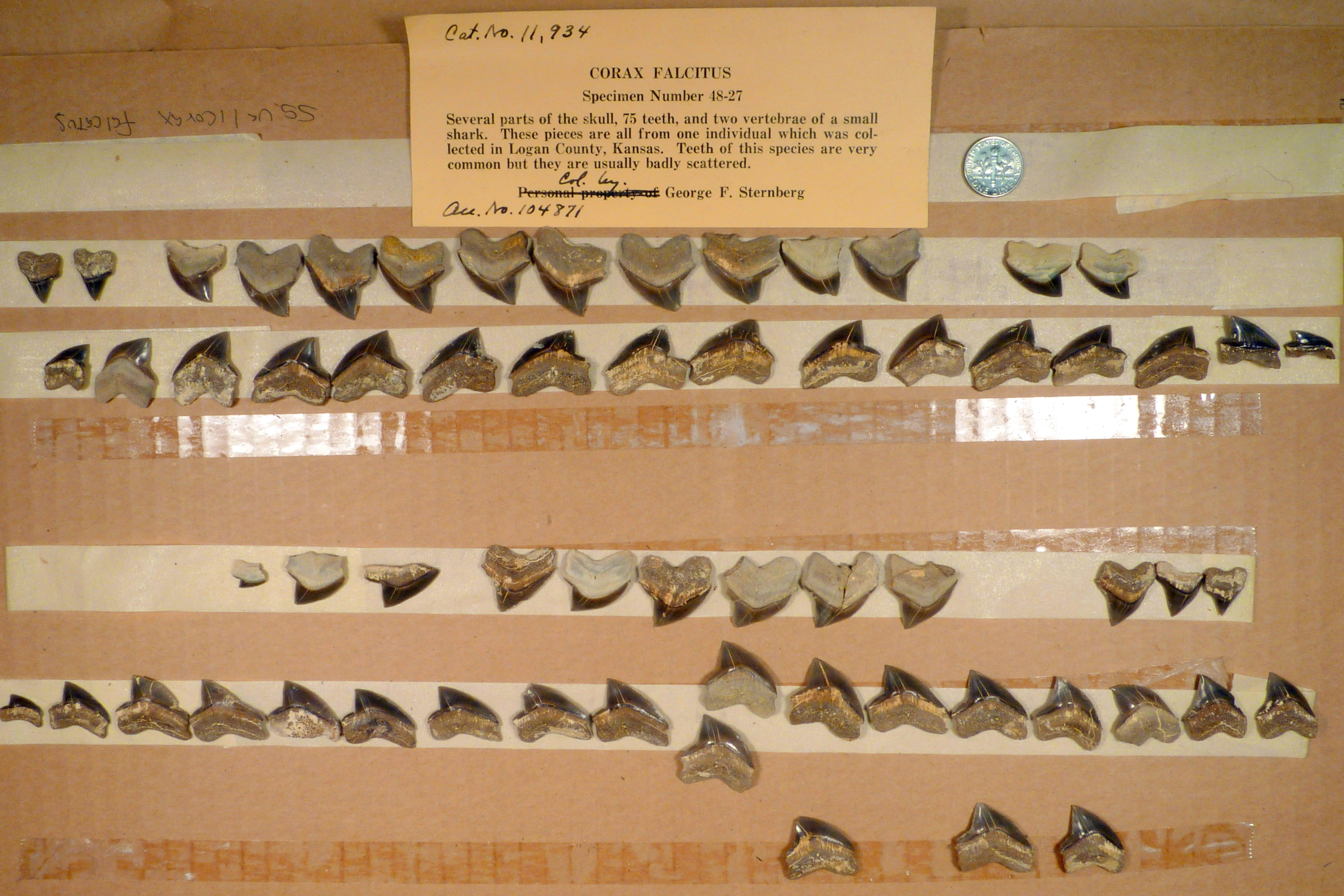
Fossil teeth of S. falcatus from Kansas

The following are the best studied species for which relatively complete skeletons are described:

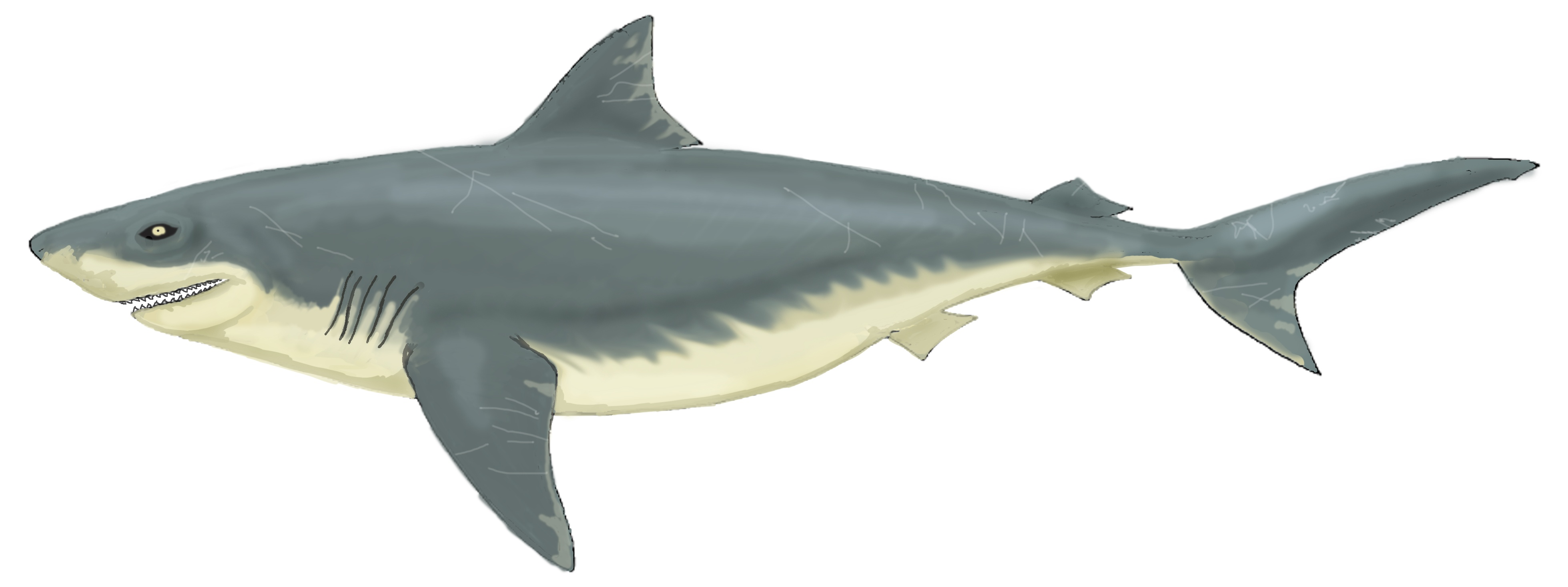
Squalicorax falcatus

- Squalicorax falcatus (Agassiz, 1843) – is a medium-sized shark with a broad snout and relatively small teeth. Its length reached almost 3 m (9.8 ft). It lived during the Cenomanian to early Santonian (Campanian). Complete skeletons are known from sediments of the Western Inland Sea of the Cretaceous in Kansas, South Dakota, and Wyoming, all in the USA. The teeth are also found in France, the Czech Republic, Canada, and Morocco. Given the small teeth, this species is considered a hunter of small prey. However, teeth marks on the bones of marine reptiles are evidence that these shark also fed on carrion. The body shape and structure of the trunk's placoid scales indicate the ability to swim quickly. A fully articulated 1.9 m (6 ft 3 in) long fossil skeleton of Squalicorax falcatus has been found in Kansas, evidence of its presence in the Western Interior Seaway.

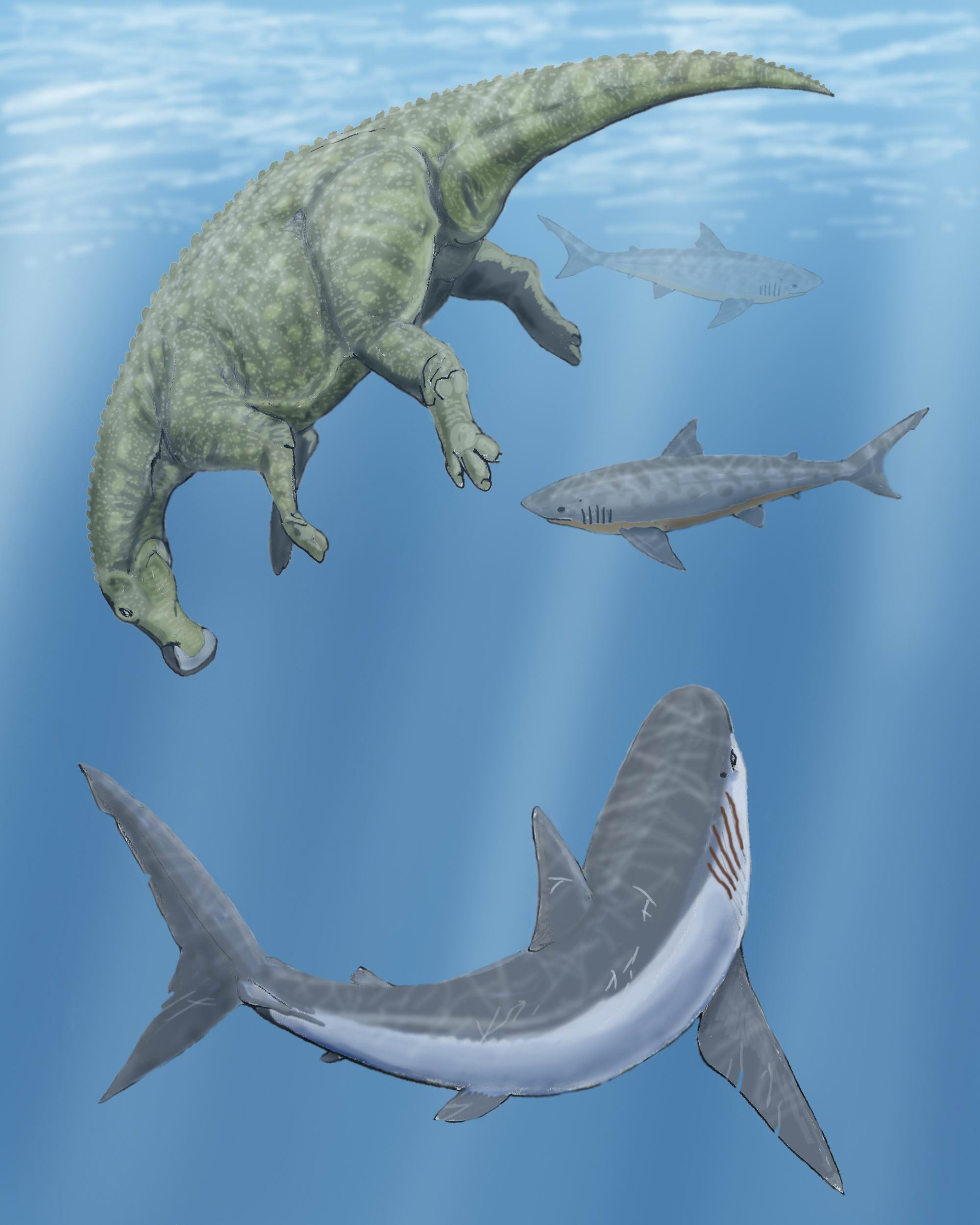
Two Squalicorax and a Cretoxyrhina circling around a dead Claosaurus

- Squalicorax kaupi (Agassiz, 1843) is from the late Santonian to the late Maastrichtian of North America, New Zealand, Japan, Africa, Europe, Kazakhstan, Jordan. and other places. It was slightly larger than the preceding species, of which it was probably an ancestor.
- Squalicorax pristodontus (Agassiz, 1843) is the largest species, exceeding 3 metres (9.8 ft) in length. From the size of its largest known teeth, it can be estimated that S. pristodontus grew to 4.8 metres (16 ft) in length. It lived during the late Campanian to early Maastrichtian of North America, France, the Netherlands, Egypt, Morocco, and Madagascar. The relatively complete remains (vertebrae and fragments of jaws) have been found in marine sediments in North America. It is the species with the largest teeth, these teeth being loosely spaced and relatively very large in comparison with other species. In this genus of sharks, studies have shown no precise correlation between the size of the teeth and the length of the body. They could eat relatively large prey and carrion.
- Squalicorax volgensis - the oldest species of the genus, from the Early Cretaceous of the Volga – was described by L. Glickman et al. in 1971. The teeth of this species had virtually no serration. They are known from the Albian to the Turonian Age in Eastern and Western Europe, as well as Texas.

== Sources ==
- H. Cappetta, Handbook of Paleoichthyology (Gustav Fischer, 1987)
