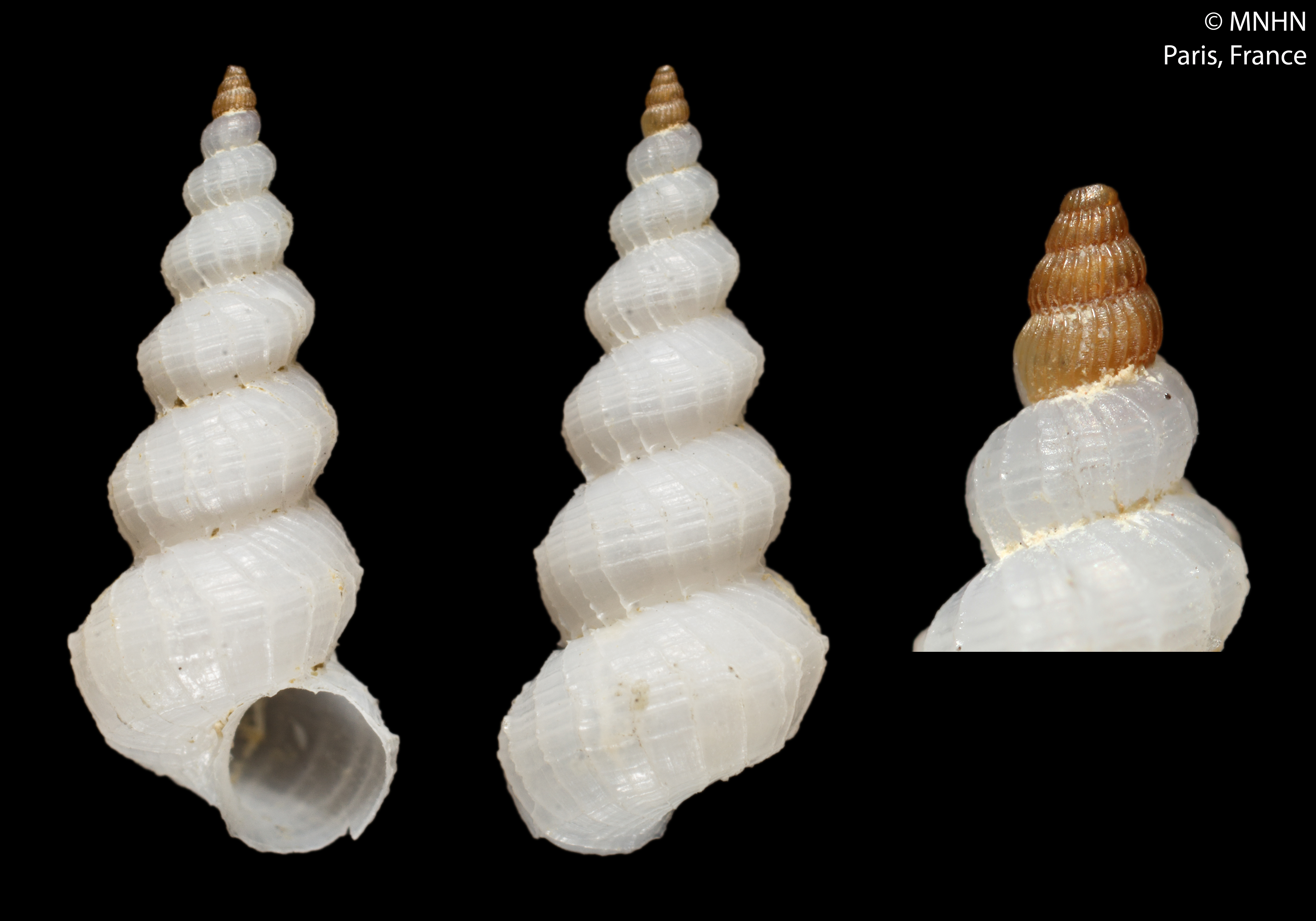
- Shell of Eccliseogyra brasiliensis (holotype at MNHN, Paris)

Scientific classification
- Kingdom: Animalia
- Phylum: Mollusca
- Class: Gastropoda
- Subclass: Caenogastropoda
- Order: incertae sedis
- Superfamily: Epitonioidea
- Family: Epitoniidae
- Genus: Eccliseogyra; Dall, 1892

Type species
- Delphinula nitida Verrill & S. Smith, 1885

Synonyms
- Abyssiscala de Boury, 1911; Liotia (Eccliseogyra) Dall, 1892 (original rank); Solutiscala de Boury, 1909

= Eccliseogyra =

Genus of gastropods

Eccliseogyra is a genus of predatory sea snails, marine prosobranch gastropod mollusks in the family Epitoniidae, commonly known as wentletraps.

== Species ==
According to the World Register of Marine Species, the following species with valid names are included within the genus Ecclesiogyra :

- Eccliseogyra aethiopica (Thiele, 1925)
- Eccliseogyra brasiliensis Garcia, 2011
- Eccliseogyra exquisita Bouchet & Warén, 1986
- Eccliseogyra folini (Dautzenberg & de Boury, 1897)
- Eccliseogyra formosissima (Jeffreys, 1884)
- Eccliseogyra fragilissima (Schepman, 1909)
- Eccliseogyra frausseni L. G. Brown, 2019
- Eccliseogyra jungcheni K.-Y. Lai, 2018
- Eccliseogyra maracatu S. Lima & Christoffersen, 2013
- Eccliseogyra monnioti Bouchet & Warén, 1986
- Eccliseogyra nitida (Verrill & S. Smith [in Verrill], 1885)
- Eccliseogyra performosa (de Boury, 1917)
- Eccliseogyra pyrrhias (R. B. Watson, 1886)
- Eccliseogyra sericea Bouchet & Warén, 1986

Species brought into synonymy

- Eccliseogyra capitata (Thiele, 1925) : synonym of Scala capitata Thiele, 1925
- Eccliseogyra carchedon (Iredale, 1936) : synonym of Epitonium carchedon (Iredale, 1936)
- Eccliseogyra dissoluta (Locard, 1897) : synonym of Eccliseogyra nitida (Verrill & S. Smith [in Verrill], 1885)
- Eccliseogyra gratissima (Thiele, 1925) : synonym of Amaea gratissima (Thiele, 1925)
- Eccliseogyra laxatoides Kuroda, 1995 : synonym of Cycloscala laxatoides (Nakayama, 1995)
- Eccliseogyra nebulosa Dall, 1919 : synonym of Amaea brunneopicta (Dall, 1908)
- Eccliseogyra striatissima (Monterosato, 1878) : synonym of Epitonium striatissimum (Monterosato, 1878)
