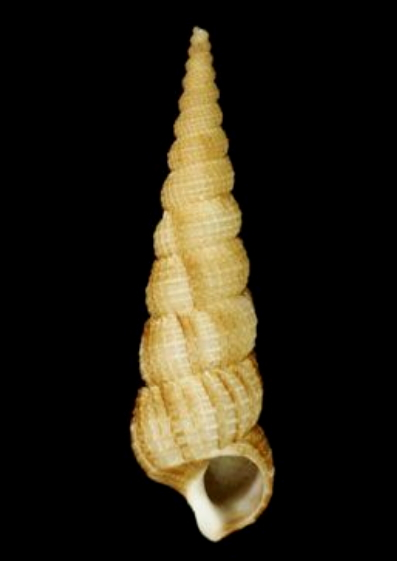
- Shell of Amaea splendida (specimen at the Natural History Museum, Rotterdam)

Scientific classification
- Kingdom: Animalia
- Phylum: Mollusca
- Class: Gastropoda
- Subclass: Caenogastropoda
- Order: incertae sedis
- Family: Epitoniidae
- Genus: Amaea
- Species: A. splendida

Binomial name
- Amaea splendida (de Boury, 1913)
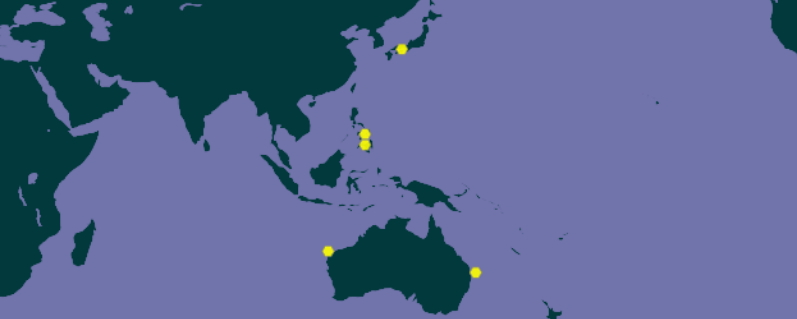

Synonyms
- Amaea kawamurai Azuma, 1960; Epitonium kawamurai (Azuma, 1960); Epitonium splendidum (de Boury, 1913); Scala (Elegantiscala) splendida de Boury, 1913; Scala splendida de Boury, 1913; Scalina splendida (de Boury, 1913)

= Amaea splendida =

Species of gastropod

Amaea splendida is a species of predatory sea snails, marine prosobranch gastropod mollusks in the family Epitoniidae.

== Description ==
The length of the shell attains 45 mm, its diameter 13 mm.

(Original description in French) The shell is slightly smaller than that of Amaea arabica, consisting of 11 whorls. The protoconch is broken. The shell even has one whorl less towards the apex and one less towards the base than A. arabica, resulting in exactly the same number of whorls for two shells of the same age. The author has not yet seen any specimens reaching the size of adult A. arabica. The individual the author is considering as the holotype appears indeed to have reached its maximum development. The suture is deep, somewhat channeled, and much less open than that of A. arabica. It is also slightly less oblique. The axial ribs, which are less prominent than in the previous species, tend to be composed of a greater number of layers, although these are still few. They are much tighter, with 32 ribs instead of 26 on the body whorl. The disc is more concave, adorned with more numerous concentric cords than in A. arabica — 5 in total, including 1 small near the columella instead of 3 altogether.

The spiral sculpture is fine and dense. It includes: one very small cord between the basal cord and the first main cord, and two small ones between the upper main cord and the suture. In total, there are 8 instead of 7. Despite this slight difference, they appear much tighter, with the whorls being lower. These cords are much less coarse than in A. arabica.

In summary, this species is distinguished from A. arabica by its much finer, tighter ornamentation, its narrower and less oblique suture, its more concave disc, and its greater number of ribs.

== Distribution ==
This marine species occurs in the Red Sea and in the Indo-West Pacific, from Mauritius to the Philippines, China, Japan and Australia.
