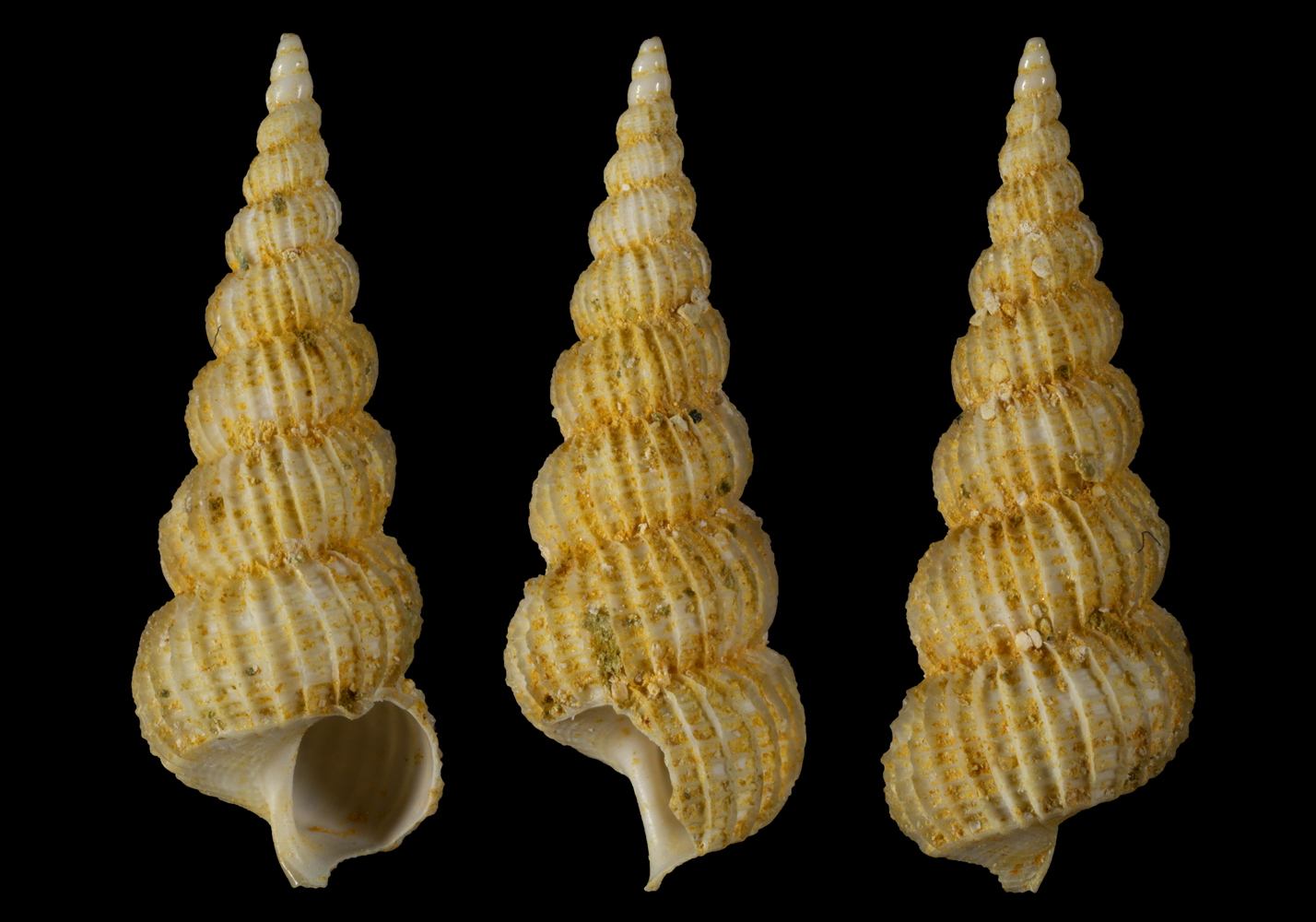
- Shell of † Amaea decussata (specimen at MNHN, Paris)

Scientific classification
- Kingdom: Animalia
- Phylum: Mollusca
- Class: Gastropoda
- Subclass: Caenogastropoda
- Order: incertae sedis
- Family: Epitoniidae
- Genus: Amaea
- Species: †A. decussata

Binomial name
- †Amaea decussata (Lamarck, 1804)

Synonyms
- † Acrilla decussata (Lamarck, 1804); † Amaea (Acrilla) decussata (Lamarck, 1804) superseded combination; † Scalaria decussata Lamarck, 1804 (original combination)

= Amaea decussata =

Species of gastropod

Amaea decussata is an extinct species of predatory sea snails, marine prosobranch gastropod mollusks in the family Epitoniidae.

== Taxonomy ==
The name Scalaria decussata or Amaea decussata, attributed to Lamarck, 1804, has been used for a Recent species from the Indian Ocean. However, the true Amaea decussata (Lamarck, 1804) is a fossil from the Eocene of the Paris Basin. For the Recent species, see Amaea arabica.

== Description ==
The length of the shell attains 18 mm.

(Original description in Latin) An elongated, turreted, imperforate shell, marked by transverse striations and densely packed with fine longitudinal ribs. The whorls are tightly contiguous.

(Original description in French) The shell is elongated, turreted, with closely adjoining and rounded whorls, and has no umbilicus. Its longitudinal ribs are numerous, closely spaced, and not very elevated. Between them, one can see small but well-defined transverse striations, which intersect with the ribs, giving the shell an elegantly latticed appearance on its surface.

== Distribution ==
Fossils of this marine species were found in Eocene strata in the region Île-de-France, France.
