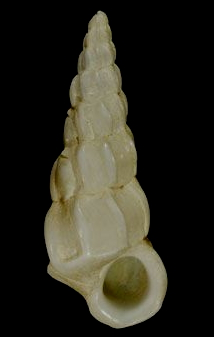
- Acirsa borealis shell (specimen at the Natural History Museum, Rotterdam)

Scientific classification
- Kingdom: Animalia
- Phylum: Mollusca
- Class: Gastropoda
- Subclass: Caenogastropoda
- Order: incertae sedis
- Superfamily: Epitonioidea
- Family: Epitoniidae
- Genus: Acirsa; Mörch, 1857

Type species
- Scalaria borealis Lyell, 1841

Synonyms
- Acirsa (Acirsa) Mörch, 1857 (alternate representation); †Acirsa (Acirsella) de Boury, 1887 (alternate representation); Acirsa (Hemiacirsa) de Boury, 1890; Acirsa (Plesioacirsa) de Boury, 1909; Hemiacirsa de Boury, 1890; †Kallosinistrala Stilwell & Zinsmeister, 1992; Notacirsa Finlay, 1926; Plastiscala Iredale, 1936; Plesioacirsa de Boury, 1909; Pseudacirsa Kobelt, 1905; Pseudoacirsa de Boury, 1909; Scala (Hemiacirsa) de Boury, 1890; Scala (Plastiscala) Iredale, 1936 (junior subjective synonym); Scala (Plesioacirsa) de Boury, 1909; Scala (Pseudacirsa) Kobelt, 1903; Scala (Pseudoacirsa) de Boury, 1909 (original rank); Scala (Tumidiacirsa) de Boury, 1911 (unnecessary replacement for Pseudoacirsa (de Boury, 1909)); Scalaria (Acirsa) Mörch, 1857; Turbonilla (Mormurella) Nomura, 1939; Turritella Wollaston, 1878

= Acirsa =

Genus of gastropods

Acirsa is a genus of predatory sea snails, marine prosobranch gastropod mollusks in the family Epitoniidae. They are commonly known as wentletraps.

== Species ==
According to the World Register of Marine Species, the following species with valid names are included within the genus Acirsa :

- †Acirsa aersispira Stilwell & Zinsmeister, 1992
- Acirsa amara Kilburn, 1985
- Acirsa antarctica E. A. Smith, 1907
- †Acirsa antarctodelicata Stilwell & Zinsmeister, 1992
- †Acirsa auversiensis Deshayes, 1861
- †Acirsa awamoaensis P. Marshall & Murdoch, 1921
- †Acirsa bezanconi de Boury, 1883
- Acirsa borealis Lyell, 1841
- †Acirsa canicularis Lamarck, 1804
- Acirsa cerralvoensis DuShane, 1970
- Acirsa coarctata Jeffreys, 1884
- Acirsa coarctata coarctata Jeffreys, J.G., 1884
- Acirsa coarctata distantespirata Nordsieck, F., 1972
- Acirsa cookiana Dell, 1956
- †Acirsa cylindracea Fenaux, 1937
- †Acirsa erasa Deshayes, 1861
- †Acirsa funiculosa Cossmann, 1888
- †Acirsa gracilis Fenaux, 1938 (accepted > unreplaced junior homonym, junior homonym of Acirsa gracilis (Verrill, 1880), a replacement name is needed)
- †Acirsa lampra Tate, 1890
- †Acirsa lanceolata Brocchi, 1814
- †Acirsa lhommei de Boury, 1913
- Acirsa martensi de Boury, 1913
- Acirsa mcleani Sirenko, 2009
- †Acirsa mioplicatula Kautsky, 1925
- Acirsa morsei Yokoyama, 1926
- Acirsa murrha DuShane, 1970
- †Acirsa oamarutica Suter, 1917
- Acirsa ochotensis Middendorff, 1848
- †Acirsa pacifica Wilckens, 1922
- †Acirsa polynema Tate, 1890
- Acirsa pratoma Dall, 1919
- †Acirsa primaeva de Boury, 1887
- †Acirsa prisca Suter, 1917
- †Acirsa sceauxsensis Landau, Ceulemans & Van Dingenen, 2018 †
- †Acirsa semicorrugata Chirli, 2009
- †Acirsa striatula Deshayes, 1832
- Acirsa subdecussata Cantraine, 1835
- †Acirsa subnodulosa P. A. Maxwell, 1988
- †Acirsa subplicata Deshayes, 1861
- †Acirsa subtenuistriata d'Orbigny, 1850
- Acirsa symphylla Martens, 1878
- †Acirsa transversaria Deshayes, 1861
- †Acirsa turriculata Fenaux, 1937
- †Acirsa vetusta P. A. Maxwell, 1992
- †Acirsa woodburnei Stilwell & Zinsmeister, 1992

The following species are also named by ITIS and in the book New Zealand Mollusca, by A. Powell

- Acirsa americana Wade, B., 1926
- Acirsa clathrata Sohl, N.F., 1964
- Acirsa cretacea Wade, B., 1917
- Acirsa culmosa Sohl, N.F., 1964
- Acirsa elatum Suter, H., 1917
- Acirsa entrichti Nordsieck, F., 1968
- Acirsa eschrichti Hölboll, 1842
- Acirsa flexicostata Sohl, N.F., 1964
- Acirsa gravida Sohl, N.F., 1964
- Acirsa implexa Sohl, N.F., 1964
- Acirsa microstriata Wade, B., 1917
- Acirsa otogoensis Stilwell, J.D., 1994
- Acirsa pelagica Risso, A., 1826
- Acirsa turrita Parona, 1894
- Acirsa vayssierei
- Acirsa wadei Cossmann, A.E.M., 1925

Species brought into synonymy

- Acirsa annectens A. W. B. Powell, 1951: synonym of Gregorioiscala annectens A. W. B. Powell, 1951
- Acirsa berryi: synonym of Couthouyella menesthoides Carpenter, 1864
- Acirsa chitaniana Yokoyama, 1926: synonym of Acirsa martensi de Boury, 1913
- Acirsa corsicana Nordsieck F., 1974 : synonym of Opalia coronata R. A. Philippi & Scacchi, 1840
- Acirsa costulata: synonym of Acirsa borealis Lyell, 1841
- Acirsa exopleura : synonym of Opalia exopleura Dall, 1917
- Acirsa gracilis : synonym of Periapta pandion Clench & Turner, 1952
- Acirsa hedleyi de Boury, 1912: synonym of Amaea hedleyi de Boury, 1912
- Acirsa menesthoides: synonym of Couthouyella menesthoides Carpenter, 1864
- Acirsa morchi Angas, 1871: synonym of Plastiscala morchi Angas, 1871
- Acirsa praelonga Jeffreys, 1877: synonym of Papuliscala praelonga Jeffreys, 1877
- Acirsa sarsii Kobelt, 1903: synonym of Gregorioiscala sarsii Kobelt, 1903
- Acirsa subcarinata (Murdoch, R. & H. Suter, 1906): synonym of Aclis subcarinata (Murdoch, R. & H. Suter, 1906)
- Acirsa undulata: synonym of Acirsa borealis Lyell, 1841

Some new species (Acirsa alpha, Acirsa beta, Acirsa delta, and Acirsa epsilon) have been named by Squires and Saul in 2003.
