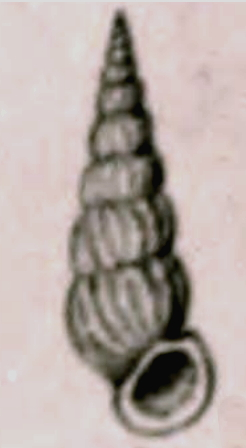
- Shell of Amaea sulcata

Scientific classification
- Kingdom: Animalia
- Phylum: Mollusca
- Class: Gastropoda
- Subclass: Caenogastropoda
- Order: incertae sedis
- Family: Epitoniidae
- Genus: Amaea
- Species: A. sulcata

Binomial name
- Amaea sulcata (G. B. Sowerby II, 1844)

Synonyms
- Epitonium sulcatum (G. B. Sowerby II, 1844); Scalaria sulcata G. B. Sowerby II, 1844 (original combination)

= Amaea sulcata =

Species of gastropod

Amaea sulcata is a species of predatory sea snails, marine prosobranch gastropod mollusks in the family Epitoniidae.

== Description ==
The length of the shell attains 18 mm.

A thin, white shell with fine spiral striations; consisting of 7 narrow, rounded whorls, separated by a moderate suture and adorned with numerous closely spaced, thin lamellae.

== Distribution ==
This marine species occurs off Japan; in the East China Sea; also off Australia (Queensland).
