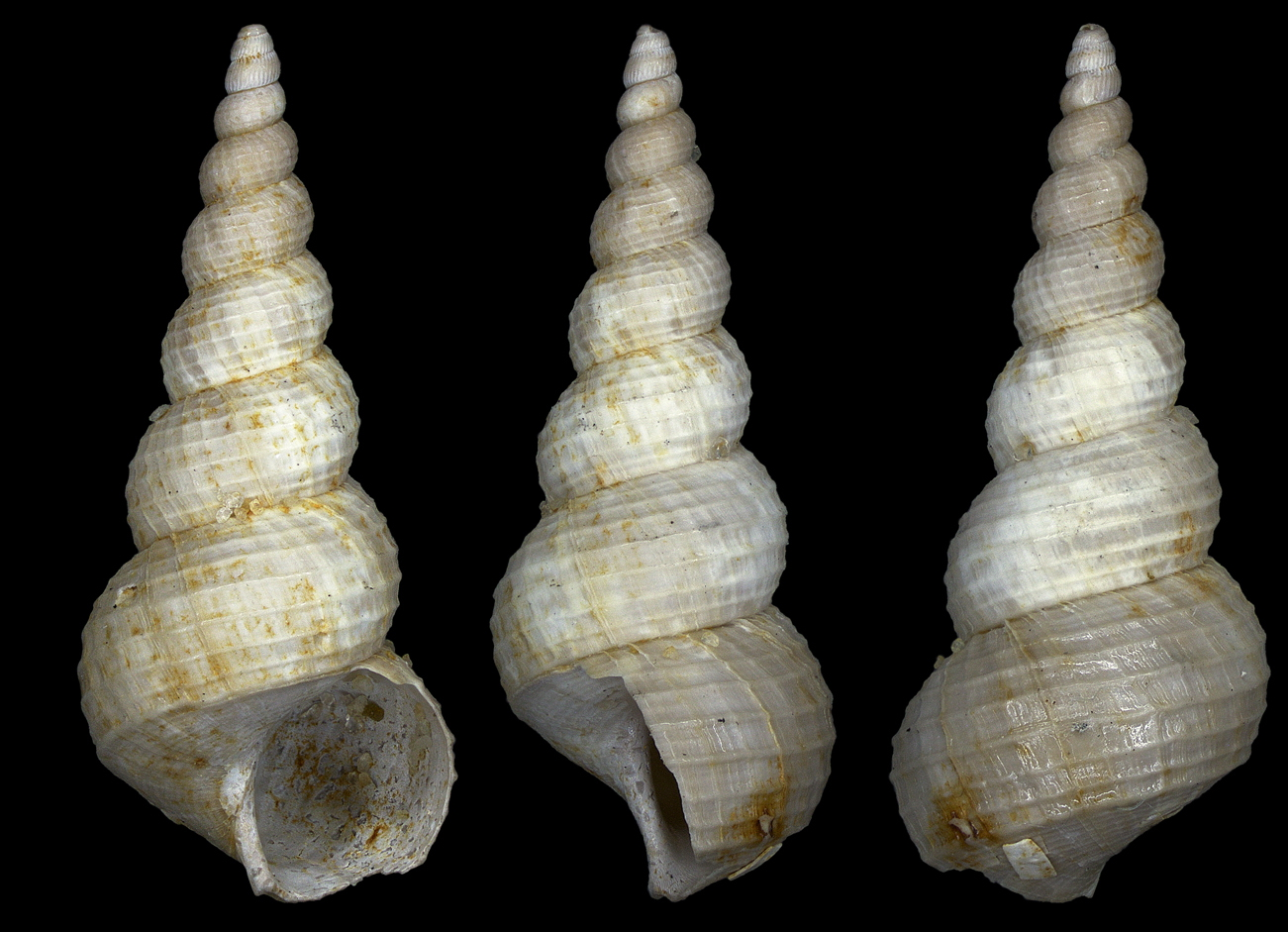
- Shell of † Amaea lapparenti (holotype at MNHN, Paris)

Scientific classification
- Kingdom: Animalia
- Phylum: Mollusca
- Class: Gastropoda
- Subclass: Caenogastropoda
- Order: incertae sedis
- Family: Epitoniidae
- Genus: Amaea
- Species: †A. lapparenti

Binomial name
- †Amaea lapparenti (de Boury, 1887)

Synonyms
- † Amaea (Littoriniscala) lapparenti (de Boury, 1887) alternative representation; † Littoriniscala lapparenti (de Boury, 1887) superseded combination; † Scala (Littoriniscala) lapparenti de Boury, 1887 superseded combination

= Amaea lapparenti =

Species of gastropod

Amaea lapparenti is an extinct species of predatory sea snails, marine prosobranch gastropod mollusks in the family Epitoniidae.

== Distribution ==
Fossils of this marine species were found in Eocene strata in Picardy, France.
