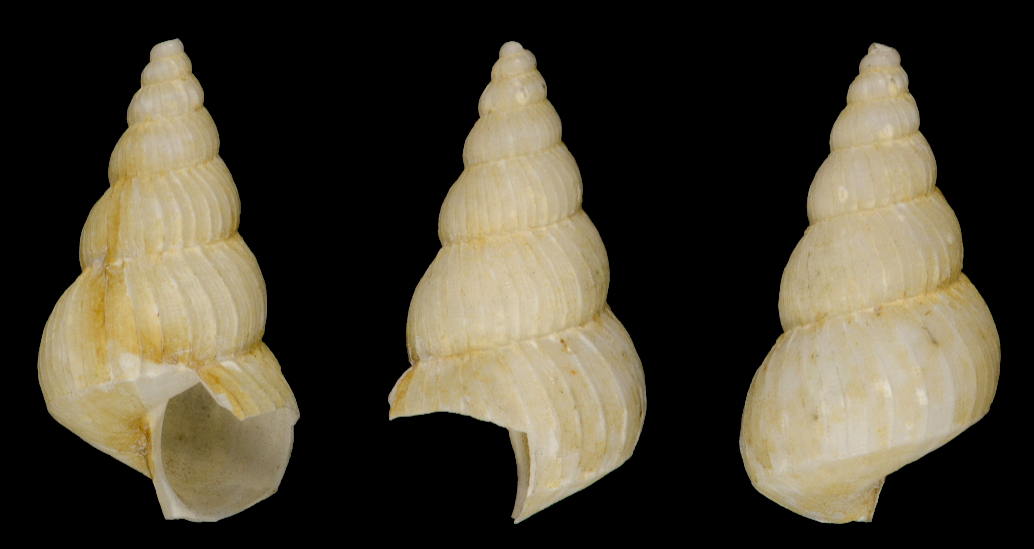
- Shell of Amaea pompholyx (holotype at the Smithsonian Institution)

Scientific classification
- Kingdom: Animalia
- Phylum: Mollusca
- Class: Gastropoda
- Subclass: Caenogastropoda
- Order: incertae sedis
- Family: Epitoniidae
- Genus: Amaea
- Species: A. pompholyx

Binomial name
- Amaea pompholyx (Dall, 1890)

Synonyms
- Scala pompholyx Dall, 1896 (superseded combination)

= Amaea pompholyx =

Species of gastropod

Amaea pompholyx is a species of predatory sea snails, marine prosobranch gastropod mollusks in the family Epitoniidae.

== Description ==
The shell grows to a length of 14 mm, its maximum diameter is 7.6 mm.

(Original description) The thin shell is conical, and inflated. it is white with a pale yellow epidermis, and features a smooth, polished, glassy protoconch. It consists of nine or more whorls.

The spiral sculpture is made up of numerous fine, closely set, rounded threads with narrower interspaces, covering the entire surface, and a single, more robust thread marking the base along which the suture runs.

The transverse sculpture includes rather irregular, rounded wrinkles that follow the incremental lines when present, though these are often absent, partially reticulating the stronger spirals.

Additionally, there are extremely thin, faintly raised varical lamellae, numbering about 32 on the body whorl; these lamellae are slightly more pronounced near the suture and fainter on the base. The suture is distinct but not deep, and the base is imperforate. The aperture is subcircular and slightly angulated below.

== Distribution ==
This marine species occurs off the Galápagos Islands.
