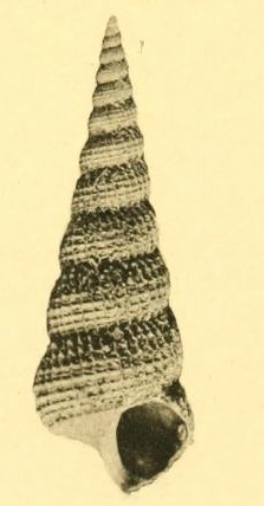
- Shell of Amaea marteli (holotype)

Scientific classification
- Kingdom: Animalia
- Phylum: Mollusca
- Class: Gastropoda
- Subclass: Caenogastropoda
- Order: incertae sedis
- Family: Epitoniidae
- Genus: Amaea
- Species: A. marteli

Binomial name
- Amaea marteli (de Boury, 1913)

Synonyms
- Scala (Elegantiscala) marteli de Boury, 1913 (basionym); Scala marteli de Boury, 1913 (original combination)

= Amaea marteli =

Species of gastropod

Amaea marteli is a species of predatory sea snails, marine prosobranch gastropod mollusks in the family Epitoniidae.

== Description ==
The length of the shell attains 12.5 mm, its diameter 4 mm.

(Original description in French) The whitish-grey shell is smaller than average. It is thin, elongated, conical, and very pointed, with no perforations. The suture is slightly oblique, not deep, and fairly wide open. The nucleus of the protoconch is broken but still consists of two smooth, pointed whorls. The subsequent 12 whorls are low and not very convex. They are adorned with moderately oblique axial ribs that are closely spaced, very low, thin, leaf-like, strongly wrinkled, and slightly auriculate at their tops. The intercostal spaces are occupied by large spiral cords much thicker than the ribs, extending onto the retrocurrent part of the ribs. These spaces are wider, forming small rectangles defined by the axial ribs and spiral cords. The interior of these compartments is adorned with very fine secondary cords, giving a granular appearance. The body whorl contains approximately 36 axial ribs. The base is bordered by a thin, sharply defined cord that marks a disc. From the circumbasal cord, the disc features very fine radiating riblets partly embedded in it, following the ribs themselves. Additionally, there are very regular and quite large concentric cords. The columellar funicle appears to be absent. The columella slopes steeply. The aperture appears oval, and the peristome, completely damaged, cannot be examined.

== Distribution ==
This marine species occurs in the Persian Gulf.

== External linkls ==
- Conchology.be: image
