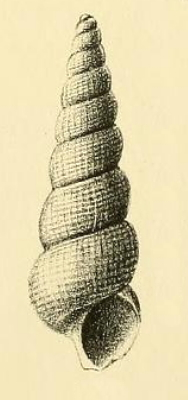
- Shell of Amaea optima (holotype)

Scientific classification
- Kingdom: Animalia
- Phylum: Mollusca
- Class: Gastropoda
- Subclass: Caenogastropoda
- Order: incertae sedis
- Family: Epitoniidae
- Genus: Amaea
- Species: A. optima

Binomial name
- Amaea optima (Melvill & Standen, 1903)

Synonyms
- Epitonium optimum (Melvill & Standen, 1903); Scala (Cirsotrema) optima Melvill & Standen, 1903 superseded combination; Scala optima Melvill & Standen, 1903

= Amaea optima =

Species of gastropod

Amaea optima is a species of predatory sea snails, marine prosobranch gastropod mollusks in the family Epitoniidae.

== Description ==
The length of the shell attains 13 mm, its diameter 3 mm.

(Original description in Latin) A slender, fusiform, whitish shell with ten whorls (based on the sole incomplete specimen), the apical ones being unclear ... the remaining whorls are deeply impressed at the sutures, and intricately adorned with closely spaced, oblique longitudinal lamellae that are thin, sharp, and occasionally bear varices. The shell is spirally ridged, with square-shaped intervals between the ridges. The aperture is small and rounded, white within, and the outer lip is thin, with a reflected margin near the umbilical area.

== Distribution ==
This marine species occurs off Muscat
