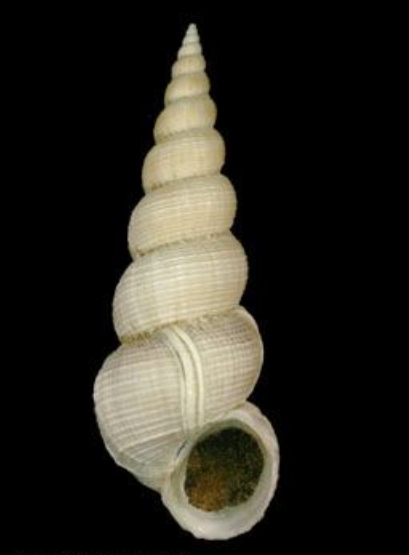
- Shell of Amaea magnifica (specimen at the Natural History Museum, Rotterdam)

Scientific classification
- Kingdom: Animalia
- Phylum: Mollusca
- Class: Gastropoda
- Subclass: Caenogastropoda
- Order: incertae sedis
- Family: Epitoniidae
- Genus: Amaea
- Species: A. magnifica

Binomial name
- Amaea magnifica (G. B. Sowerby II, 1844)

Synonyms
- Scalaria magnifica G. B. Sowerby II, 1844

= Amaea magnifica =

Species of gastropod

Amaea magnifica is a species of predatory sea snails, marine prosobranch gastropod mollusks in the family Epitoniidae.

== Description ==
The length of the shell attains 103 mm.

(Original description in Latin) The very thin, delicate, elongated shell is imperforate and is spirally encircled with numerous fine raised ribs, featuring a prominent larger rib near the lower part of the whorls. The thin lamellae are irregularly spaced. The whorls are somewhat numerous, swollen, and slightly elevated near the deep suture. Varices are exceedingly rare. The shell's color is predominantly white, delicately tinged with pale purple and yellowish hues.

== Distribution ==
This marine species occurs off Japan and Taiwan.
