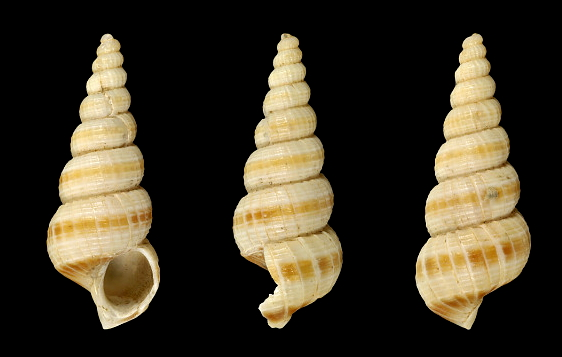
- Shell of Amaea mitchelli (holotype at the Smithsonian Institution)

Scientific classification
- Kingdom: Animalia
- Phylum: Mollusca
- Class: Gastropoda
- Subclass: Caenogastropoda
- Order: incertae sedis
- Family: Epitoniidae
- Genus: Amaea
- Species: A. mitchelli

Binomial name
- Amaea mitchelli (Dall, 1896)
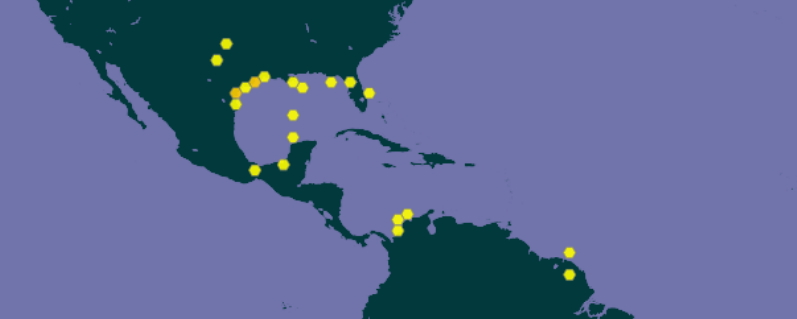

Synonyms
- Scala mitchelli Dall, 1896 (original combination)

= Amaea mitchelli =

Species of gastropod

Amaea mitchelli, common name Mitchell's wentletrap, is a species of predatory sea snails, marine prosobranch gastropod mollusks in the family Epitoniidae.

It was named for James D. Mitchell (1848–1922), a Texas naturalist.

== Description ==
The shell grows to a length of 46 mm, its maximum diameter is 14 mm.

(Original description) The shell is relatively large for the genus. It is thin, with rounded, compact whorls and a well-defined suture, topped by an elongated spire. Its color is a yellowish white, with a dark reddish-brown band above the periphery and across the basal area.

The surface is covered with numerous low, fine, spiral riblets, spaced by wider interspaces, and crossed by approximately 18 distant, irregularly spaced, low varical threads, slightly angled just in front of the suture. The body whorl features a narrow basal cord adorned with fine spiral threads, with a brownish spiral band visible just beneath the cord. The younger whorls display a tendency toward peripheral angulation. The basal area is distinct, bordered by a low keel, with weak spiral sculpture, though the varical ridges remain unchanged. The axis is imperforate.

The aperture is higher than wide, with an interrupted peristome over the body. The columellar lip is strongly reflected, while the outer lip is narrow and subtly reflexed.

The shell of the holotype is decollate, showing eight strongly convex whorls, though originally it likely had at least three or four more.

== Distribution ==
This marine species occurs in the Gulf of Mexico; also off Colombia and French Guiana.
