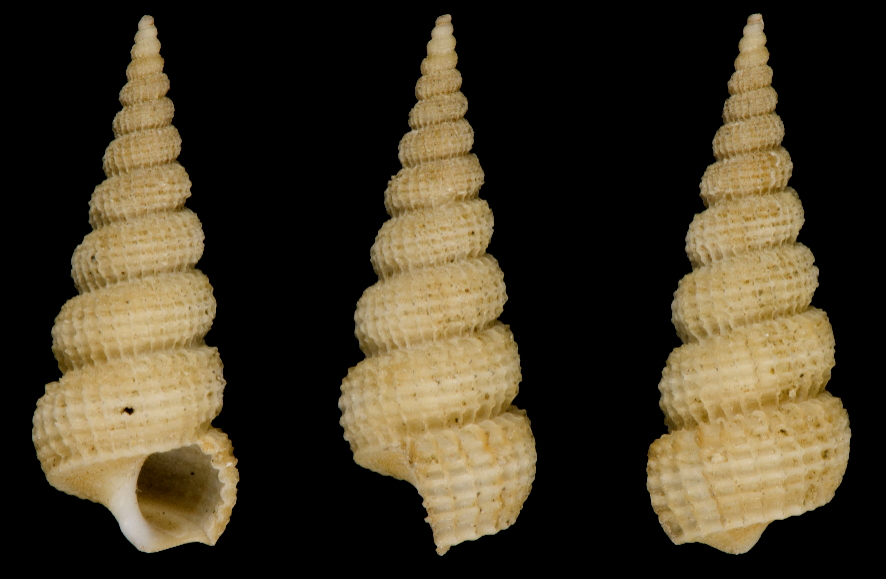
- Shell of Amaea retifera (lectotype at the Smithsonian Institution)

Scientific classification
- Kingdom: Animalia
- Phylum: Mollusca
- Class: Gastropoda
- Subclass: Caenogastropoda
- Order: incertae sedis
- Family: Epitoniidae
- Genus: Amaea
- Species: A. retifera

Binomial name
- Amaea retifera (Dall, 1889)
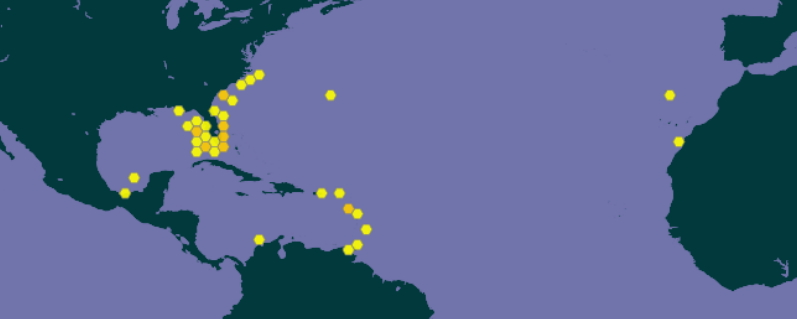

Synonyms
- Scala (Acrilla) retifera Dall, 1889

= Amaea retifera =

Species of gastropod

Amaea retifera is a species of predatory sea snails, marine prosobranch gastropod mollusks in the family Epitoniidae.

== Description ==
The shell grows to a length of 12.5 mm, its maximum diameter is 4.3 mm.

(Original description) The shell is small and thin. It is yellowish or grayish in color. The shell consists of ten regular whorls and three smooth, polished dark brown whorls in the protoconch. Its apex is acute, with well-rounded whorls and a distinct suture. The surface of the whorls is closely reticulated, with about 25 slightly elevated, thin transverse lamellae on the body whorl, and five strong, evenly spaced, regular spiral ribs. The lamellae are fluted and frilled with great regularity as they pass over the ribs. They extend from the suture to the margin of the large basal disk, where they continue as slightly raised lines, radiating toward the axis of the shell, giving the disk a wheel-like appearance. The disk, slightly concave, is sculpted with fine radiating threads and stronger spiral threads. The entire shell, including the disk, has a brownish-yellow tint, except for the columella, which is pure white, polished, and features a single strong spiral fasciole. The outer lip is thin, with little reflection, and the margin is angled by the carina of the disk and the slightly projecting columella, giving the aperture a somewhat squarish appearance. The large basal disk occupies most of the base from the suture downward.

== Distribution ==
This marine species was found on the North Carolina shelf, USA to Brazil; and off Barbados and Guadeloupe.
