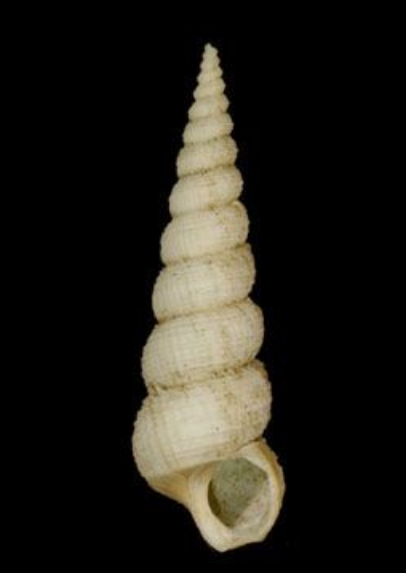
- Shell of Amaea gazeoides (specimen at the Natural History Museum, Rotterdam)

Scientific classification
- Kingdom: Animalia
- Phylum: Mollusca
- Class: Gastropoda
- Subclass: Caenogastropoda
- Order: incertae sedis
- Family: Epitoniidae
- Genus: Amaea
- Species: A. gazeoides

Binomial name
- Amaea gazeoides Kuroda & T. Habe, 1961

= Amaea gazeoides =

Species of gastropod

Amaea gazeoides is an extinct species of predatory sea snails, marine prosobranch gastropod mollusks in the family Epitoniidae.

== Description ==
The length of the shell attains 26 mm.

== Distribution ==
This marine species occurs off the Philippines; in the East China Sea, and Japan.
