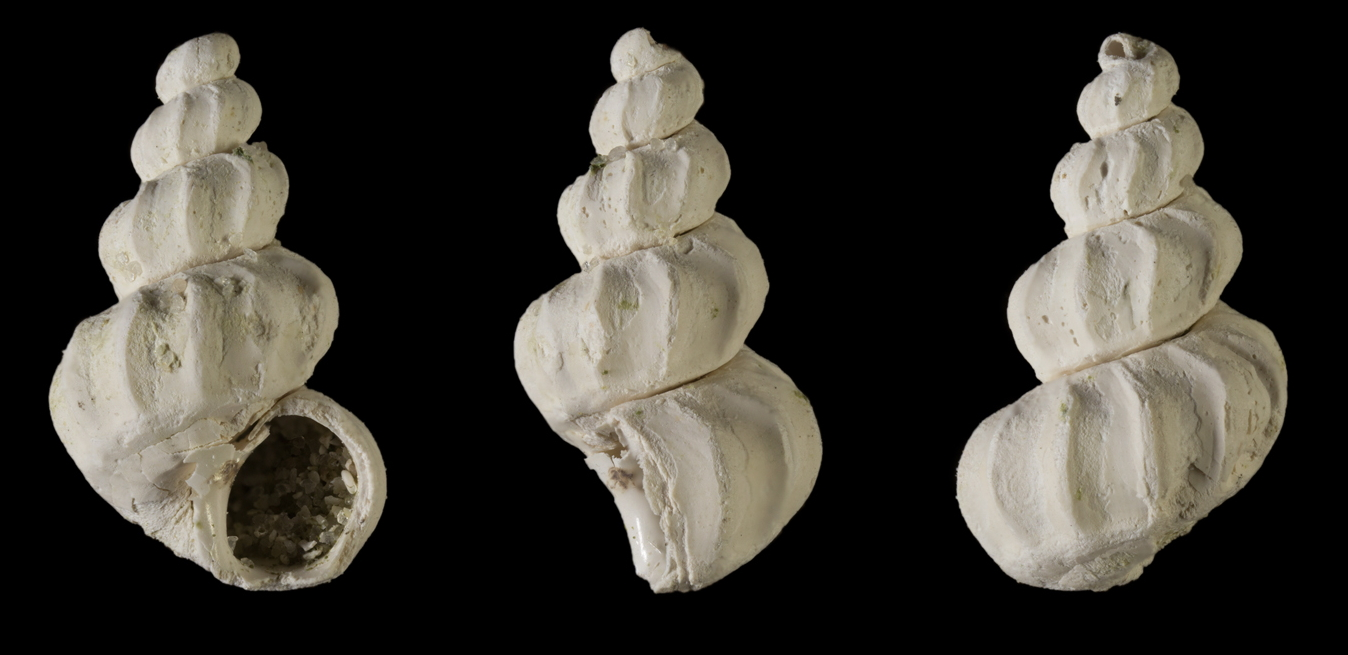
- Shell of † Amaea bowerbankii (specimen at MNHN, Paris)

Scientific classification
- Kingdom: Animalia
- Phylum: Mollusca
- Class: Gastropoda
- Subclass: Caenogastropoda
- Order: incertae sedis
- Family: Epitoniidae
- Genus: Amaea
- Species: †A. bowerbankii

Binomial name
- †Amaea bowerbankii (J. Morris, 1852)

Synonyms
- † Amaea (Coniscala) bowerbankii (J. Morris, 1852); † Scalaria bowerbankii J. Morris, 1852 superseded combination

= Amaea bowerbankii =

Species of gastropod

Amaea bowerbankii is an extinct species of predatory sea snails, marine prosobranch gastropod mollusks in the family Epitoniidae.

== Description ==
(Original description) An elongated, turreted, moderately thick shell featuring nine to ten rounded, ventricose whorls. The shell is marked by 18 to 20 somewhat sharp, slightly oblique longitudinal ribs, with both the ribs and the intervening furrows finely transversely striated. The body whorl is distinctly carinated.

On the lower whorls, the ribs may become divided and more irregular compared to the more uniform ribs on the upper whorls.

== Distribution ==
Fossils of this marine species were found in Paleogene strata of the Lower Thanet Sands (Great Britain) and Marne, France.
