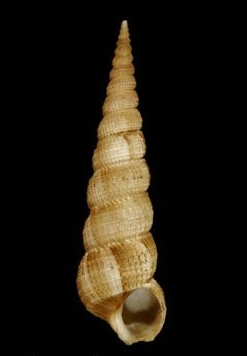
- Shell of Amaea sericogazea (specimen at the Natural History Museum, Rotterdam)

Scientific classification
- Kingdom: Animalia
- Phylum: Mollusca
- Class: Gastropoda
- Subclass: Caenogastropoda
- Order: incertae sedis
- Family: Epitoniidae
- Genus: Amaea
- Species: A. sericogazea

Binomial name
- Amaea sericogazea (Masahito, Kuroda & T. Habe, 1971)

Synonyms
- Amaea teramachii Kaicher, 1980; Scalina sericogazea Masahito, Kuroda & T. Habe, 1971 superseded combination

= Amaea sericogazea =

Species of gastropod

Amaea sericogazea is a species of predatory sea snails, marine prosobranch gastropod mollusks in the family Epitoniidae.

== Description ==
The length of the shell attains 30 mm.

== Distribution ==
This marine species was found in Sagami Bay, Japan; it also occurs in the East China Sea and off the Philippines.
