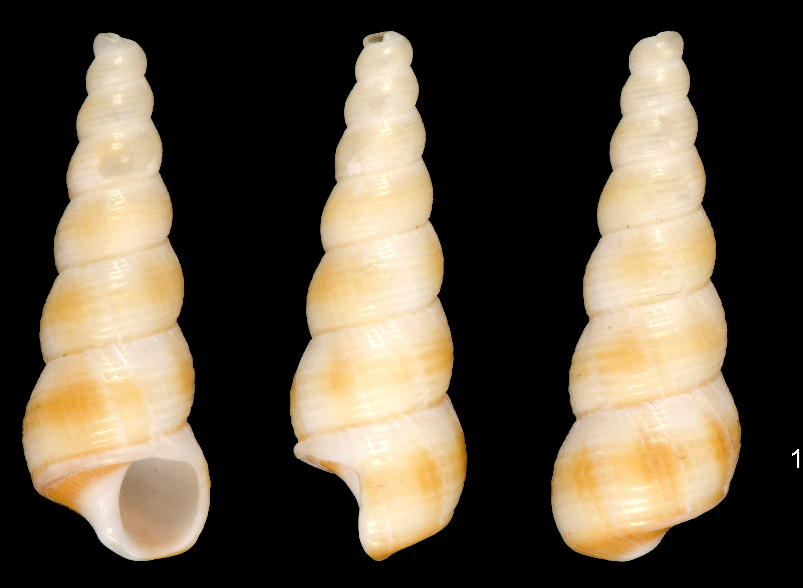
- Shell of Amaea brunneopicta (holotype at the Smithsonian Institution)

Scientific classification
- Kingdom: Animalia
- Phylum: Mollusca
- Class: Gastropoda
- Subclass: Caenogastropoda
- Order: incertae sedis
- Family: Epitoniidae
- Genus: Amaea
- Species: A. brunneopicta

Binomial name
- Amaea brunneopicta (Dall, 1908)
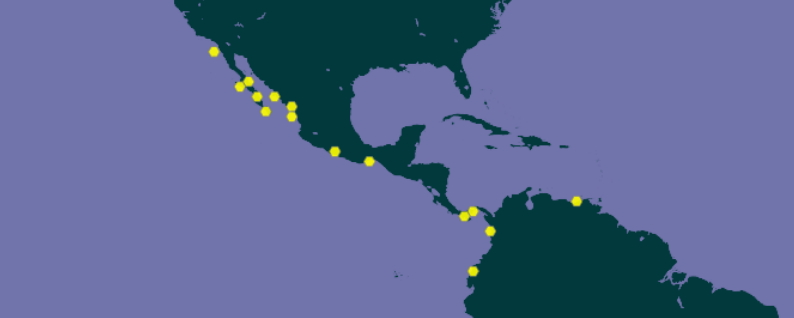

Synonyms
- Eccliseogyra nebulosa (Dall, 1919); Eglisia nebulosa Dall, 1919 junior subjective synonym; Epitonium (Ferminoscala) brunneopictum Dall, 1908; Epitonium brunneopictum Dall, 1908

= Amaea brunneopicta =

Species of gastropod

Amaea brunneopicta is a species of predatory sea snails, marine prosobranch gastropod mollusks in the family Epitoniidae.

== Description ==
The shell grows to a length of 37 mm, its maximum diameter is 10 mm.

(Original description) The shell is slender and acute. It is pale brown with a broad peripheral band and a basal disk of darker brown. It consists of approximately eleven whorls, excluding the missing protoconch. Its sculpture mirrors that of Amaea ferminiana, with three primary and about six secondary spirals between the sutures, accompanied by fine spiral striae. The axial lamellae are small, sharp, and regularly spaced, with around thirty-six on the penultimate whorl, appearing as delicate whitish lines on the brown surface. The basal disk is distinctly threaded with sharp spirals and is slightly elevated.

== Distribution ==
This marine species occurs in the Pacific Ocean off Lower California, USA; also off Mexico, Panama and Colombia.
