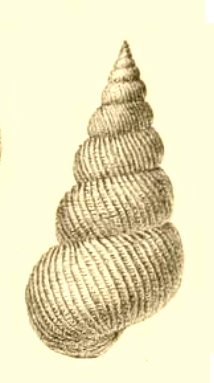
- Shell of Amaea aspicienda (holotype)

Scientific classification
- Kingdom: Animalia
- Phylum: Mollusca
- Class: Gastropoda
- Subclass: Caenogastropoda
- Order: incertae sedis
- Family: Epitoniidae
- Genus: Amaea
- Species: A. aspicienda

Binomial name
- Amaea aspicienda (Melvill, 1912)

Synonyms
- Epitonium aspiciendum (Melvill, 1912); Scala aspicienda Melvill, 1912

= Amaea aspicienda =

Species of gastropod

Amaea aspicienda is a species of predatory sea snails, marine prosobranch gastropod mollusks in the family Epitoniidae.

== Description ==
The length of the shell attains 15 mm, its diameter 6.75 mm.

(Original description in Latin) The oblong-fusiform shell is extremely delicate and has a papyracious texture. It has a narrow fissure and a white coloration. It features up to 11 whorls, including 3-4 small, glossy, smooth, and translucent apical whorls. The remaining whorls are slightly swollen and impressed at the sutures, densely covered with an intricate network pattern with fine, closely spaced lamellae, particularly on the upper whorls, where there are around 50 lamellae on the antepenultimate whorl. The surface is finely ornamented with closely packed spiral ridges, and the interstices between the lirations are microscopically finely striolate with subtle longitudinal striations. The aperture is round, with the single specimen's lip fractured and imperfect. it is thin an slightly expanded. The columellar margin is reflexed.

== Distribution ==
This marine species occurs in the Arabian Sea, west of Mumbai.
