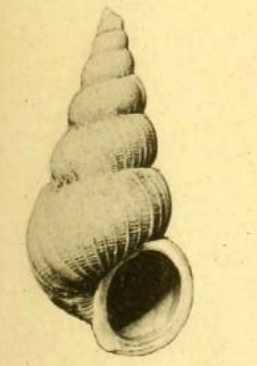
- Shell of Amaea grossicingulata (holotype)

Scientific classification
- Kingdom: Animalia
- Phylum: Mollusca
- Class: Gastropoda
- Subclass: Caenogastropoda
- Order: incertae sedis
- Family: Epitoniidae
- Genus: Amaea
- Species: A. grossicingulata

Binomial name
- Amaea grossicingulata (de Boury, 1913)

Synonyms
- Scala (Foliaceiscala) grossicingulata de Boury, 1913 (superseded combination); Scala grossicingulata de Boury, 1913

= Amaea grossicingulata =

Species of gastropod

Amaea grossicingulata is a species of predatory sea snails, marine prosobranch gastropod mollusks in the family Epitoniidae.

== Description ==
The length of the shell attains 13 mm, its diameter 6 mm.

(Original description in French) The conical shell is white, featuring a narrow umbilical perforation, adorned with filiform longitudinal ribs and relatively large decurrent cords. The open suture is slightly oblique, fairly deep and unperforated.

The protoconch is broken. There are 6 1/2 remaining convex whorls, decorated with slightly oblique, sharp filiform longitudinal ribs that are barely protruding, occasionally thickening into very low varices. These ribs lack auricles and form a small expansion within the suture, reducing their exposure to wear. The intercostal spaces display large transverse cords arranged in a very regular pattern, with gaps nearly equal to the cords. Approximately 12 cords are visible on the penultimate whorl. The body whorl, nearly equivalent in size to the preceding whorls if complete, contains 28 ribs, including 2 varices. The base is convex without a cord around the base. Ribs extend onto the base and enter the greatly reduced umbilical perforation. The columella lacks a funiculus. The aperture is oval-oblong with a double peristome. The thin, inner peristome is continuous and merges somewhat with the less developed, discontinuous inner peristome at its rear portion. No lip auricle is discernible. The peristome gently slopes towards the anterior columellar region.

== Distribution ==
This marine species occurs off the Philippines and in the East China Sea.

== External linkls ==
- Conchology.be: image
