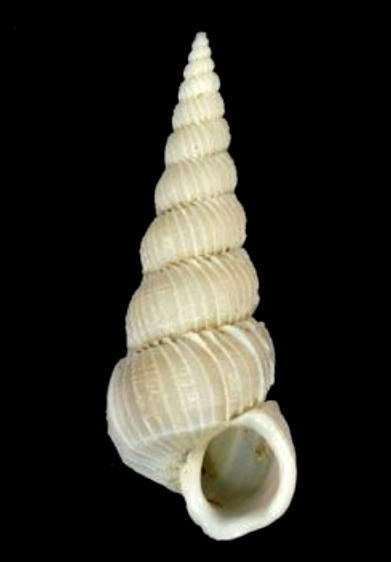
- Shell of Amaea thielei (specimen at the Natural History Museum, Rotterdam)

Scientific classification
- Kingdom: Animalia
- Phylum: Mollusca
- Class: Gastropoda
- Subclass: Caenogastropoda
- Order: incertae sedis
- Family: Epitoniidae
- Genus: Amaea
- Species: A. thielei

Binomial name
- Amaea thielei (de Boury, 1913)

Synonyms
- Scala (Amaea) thielei de Boury, 1913; Scala thielei de Boury, 1913; † Scalaria picturata Yokoyama, 1922

= Amaea thielei =

Species of gastropod

Amaea thielei is a species of predatory sea snails, marine prosobranch gastropod mollusks in the family Epitoniidae.

== Description ==
The length of the shell attains 22 mm, its diameter 7 mm.

(Original description in French) The thin shell is extremely fragile, thin, imperforate, and elongated-conical in shape. It is adorned with numerous longitudinal, filiform, delicate, leaf-like ribs that are barely prominent, along with many fine transverse cords, giving the shell a decussate appearance. The suture, although not very deep, is quite open and entirely imperforate.

The apex of the shell is missing, with only half of a smooth embryonic whorl remaining. The subsequent whorls, totaling 11 1/2, are very convex and grow slowly. They are decorated with numerous, tightly spaced, sharp, thin, and barely raised longitudinal ribs that are somewhat filiform. These ribs occasionally transform into equally thin, but slightly more pronounced varices, which curve at the top, often becoming more prominent and forming a kind of embossed expansion near the suture. Between these ribs are faintly developed, numerous, unevenly descending cords that extend onto the inner face of the ribs opposite the aperture.

The body whorl, smaller than the rest of the spire, bears approximately 50 ribs and 15 transverse cords. The base is slightly convex, adorned with radiating lamellae that continue from the ribs after they fold onto the base. The base is defined by an angular edge, accompanied by a cord that encircles it. There is only a faint trace of concentric cords, barely visible on the surface of the shell. The continuation of the axial ribs towards the columella is more pronounced.

The aperture is ovate-oblong. The peristome is double: the inner peristome is continuous, very thin, and reduced to a simple sheet, while the outer peristome is interrupted at the posterior part and formed by the last varix. The columella is accompanied by a barely noticeable funiculus, and it slopes slightly at the anterior part. The shell's color is a white with a faint tinge of fawn.

== Distribution ==
This marine species occurs off Japan and Korea.
