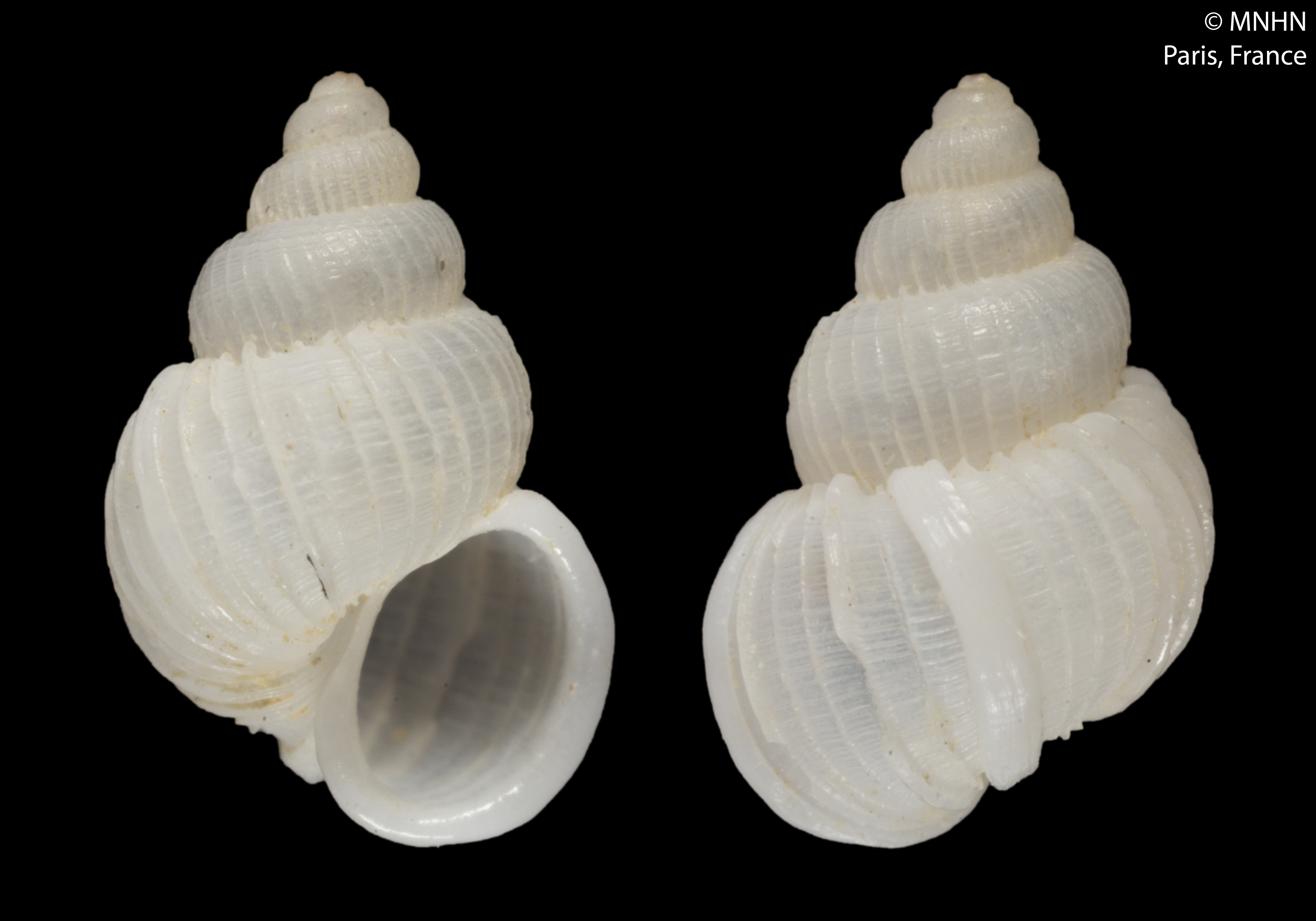
- Shell of Amaea globularis (holotype at MNHN, paris)

Scientific classification
- Kingdom: Animalia
- Phylum: Mollusca
- Class: Gastropoda
- Subclass: Caenogastropoda
- Order: incertae sedis
- Family: Epitoniidae
- Genus: Amaea
- Species: A. globularis

Binomial name
- Amaea globularis Bozzetti, 2009

= Amaea globularis =

Species of gastropod

Amaea globularis is an extinct species of predatory sea snails, marine prosobranch gastropod mollusks in the family Epitoniidae.

== Description ==
The length of the shell attains 7 mm.

== Distribution ==
This marine species occurs off Madagascar.
