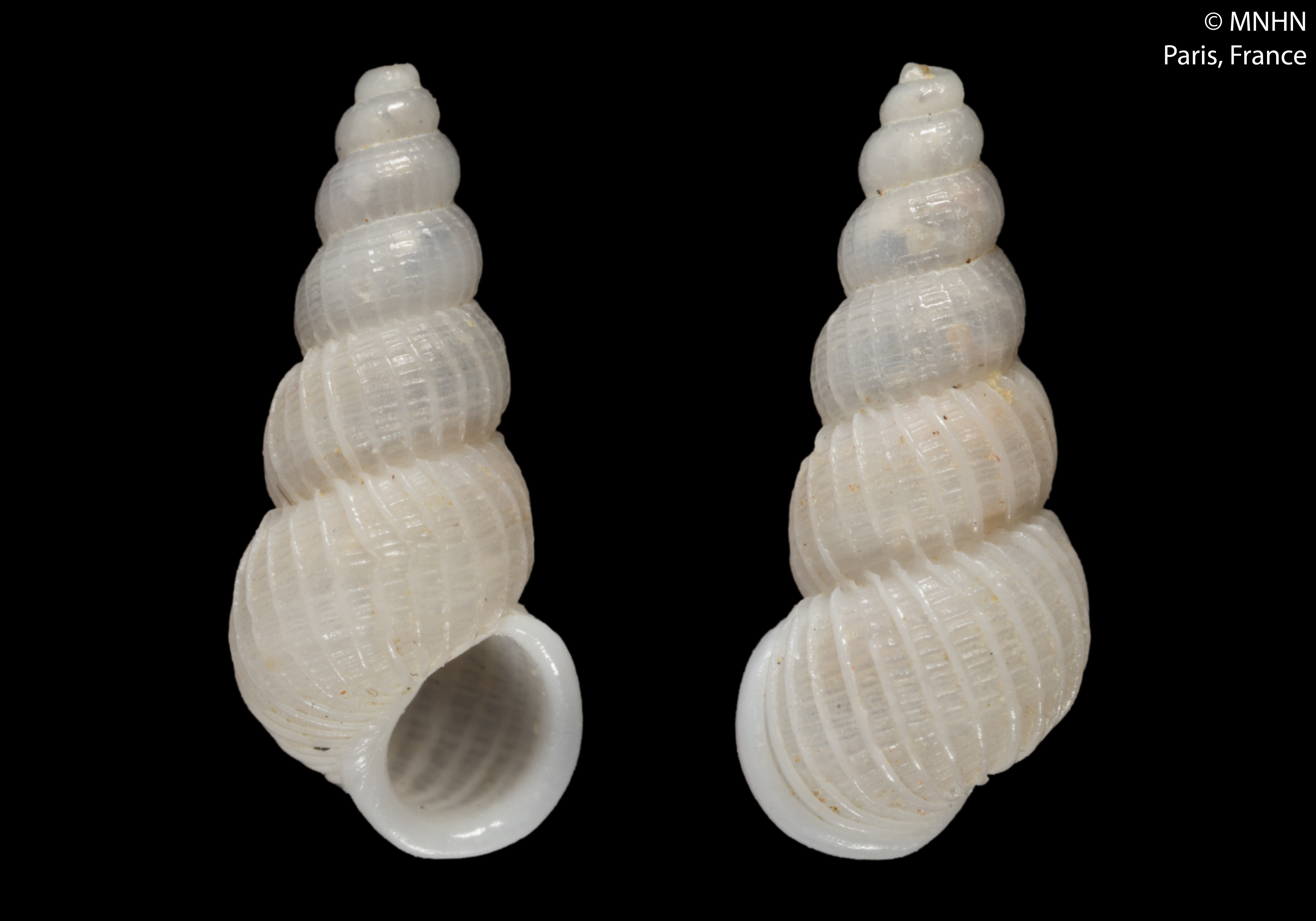
- Shell of Amaea solangeae (holotype at MNHN, Paris)

Scientific classification
- Kingdom: Animalia
- Phylum: Mollusca
- Class: Gastropoda
- Subclass: Caenogastropoda
- Order: incertae sedis
- Family: Epitoniidae
- Genus: Amaea
- Species: A. solangeae

Binomial name
- Amaea solangeae Bozzetti, 2008

= Amaea solangeae =

Species of gastropod

Amaea solangeae is a species of predatory sea snails, marine prosobranch gastropod mollusks in the family Epitoniidae.

== Description ==
The length of the shell attains 6.8 mm.

== Distribution ==
This marine species occurs off Madagascar.
