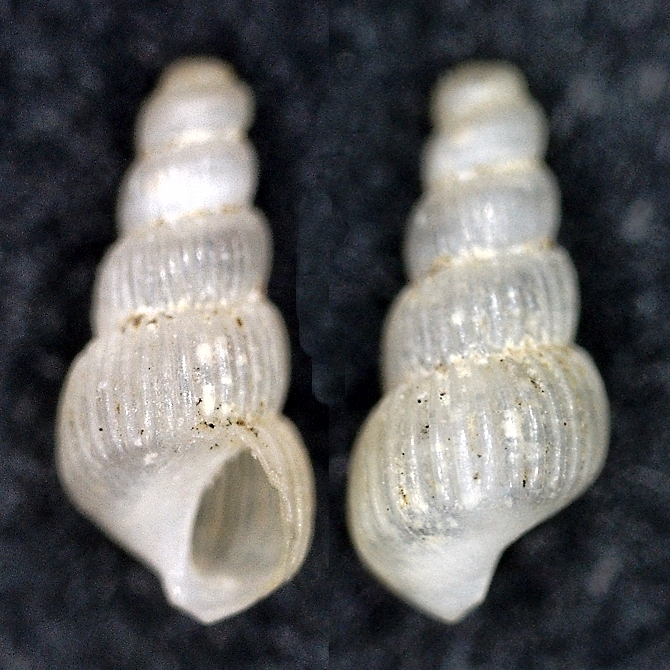
- Shell of Amaea optata (specimen at the Natural History Museum, Rotterdam)

Scientific classification
- Kingdom: Animalia
- Phylum: Mollusca
- Class: Gastropoda
- Subclass: Caenogastropoda
- Order: incertae sedis
- Family: Epitoniidae
- Genus: Amaea
- Species: A. optata

Binomial name
- Amaea optata (Jousseaume, 1912)

Synonyms
- Epitonium optatum (Jousseaume, 1912); Tenuiscala optata Jousseaume, 1912 ·

= Amaea optata =

Species of gastropod

Amaea optata is a species of predatory sea snails, marine prosobranch gastropod mollusks in the family Epitoniidae.

== Description ==
The length of the shell attains 3.5 mm, its diameter 1.5 mm.

(Original description in Latin) A small, imperforate, solid, whitish shell with an elongate-conical shape, latticed by numerous small varices and delicate thread-like striations. It features 8 convex whorls that descend gradually and evenly. The first three whorls are smooth, while the subsequent ones are adorned with numerous, slightly arched varices, elegantly striated between them. The aperture is rounded, with barely noticeable angulation at the front and back, and the peristome is relatively thick, nearly interrupted at the base of the penultimate whorl.

== Distribution ==
This marine species occurs off Aden
