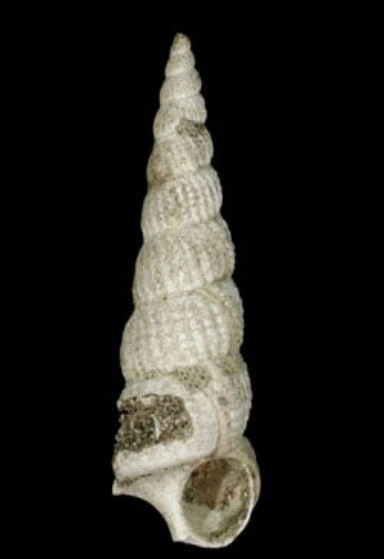
- Shell of † Amaea woodi (specimen at the Natural History Museum, Rotterdam)

Scientific classification
- Kingdom: Animalia
- Phylum: Mollusca
- Class: Gastropoda
- Subclass: Caenogastropoda
- Order: incertae sedis
- Family: Epitoniidae
- Genus: Amaea
- Species: †A. woodi

Binomial name
- †Amaea woodi (Deshayes, 1861)

Synonyms
- † Scallaria woodi Deshayes, 1861; † Scala (Clathroscala) woodi (Deshayes - Harmer, 1920); † Scala (Clathorscala) cancellata (Brocchi - van Der Burg, 1920); † Amaea (Clathroscala) woodi (Deshayes - Glibert, 1958)

= Amaea woodi =

Species of gastropod

Amaea woodi is a very rare extinct species of predatory sea snails, marine prosobranch gastropod mollusks in the family Epitoniidae.

== Description ==
The length of the shell varies between 12 mm and 14 mm, its diameter between 4 mm and 5 mm.

A shell significantly smaller than the typical † Clathroscala cancellata, elongated and tapering to a fine point, smooth (except for the growth lines), thin and fragile. It features 9 or 10 slightly convex whorls, adorned with fine, closely packed, longitudinal ribs and delicate transverse striations, both of which terminate abruptly at the peristome. The suture is deep. The aperture is subcircular, and the peristome is continuous.

== Distribution ==
Fossils of this marine species were found in Pliocene strata in the harbour of Antwerp, Belgium; it was originally found in the Coralline Crag Formation, East Anglia, Great Britain.
