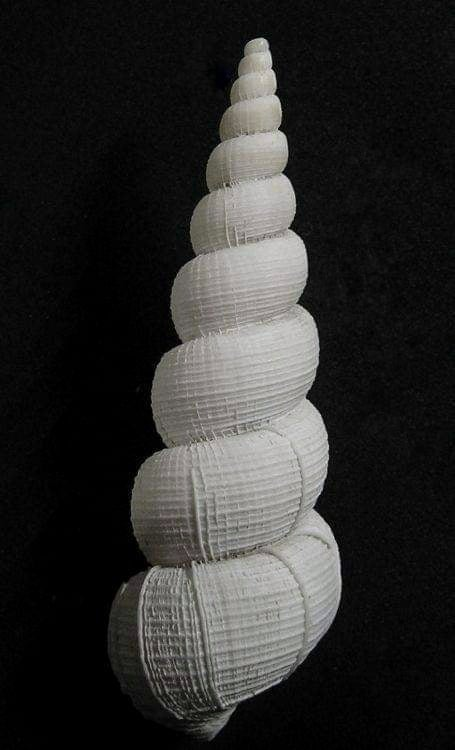
- Shell of Amaea magnifica

Scientific classification
- Kingdom: Animalia
- Phylum: Mollusca
- Class: Gastropoda
- Subclass: Caenogastropoda
- Order: incertae sedis
- Family: Epitoniidae
- Genus: Amaea; H. Adams & A. Adams, 1853

Type species
- Scalaria magnifica G. B. Sowerby II, 1844
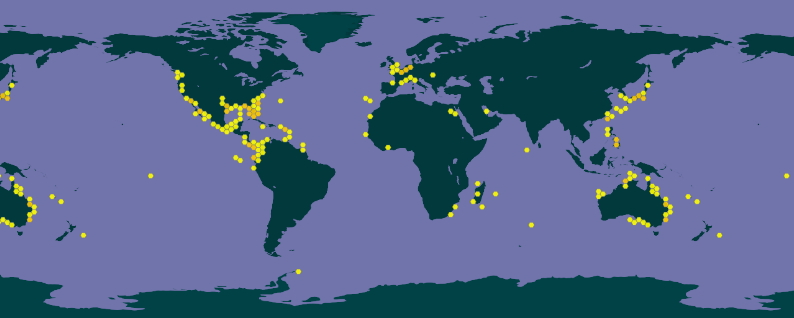

Synonyms
- Amaea (Amaea) H. Adams & A. Adams, 1853 alternative representation; † Amaea (Bifidoscala) Cossmann, 1888 alternative representation; † Amaea (Coniscala) de Boury, 1887 alternative representation; † Amaea (Littoriniscala) de Boury, 1887 alternative representation; Amaea (Scalina) Conrad, 1865; Amaea (Variciscala) de Boury, 1909 alternative representation; Epitonium (Ferminoscala) Dall, 1908; Ferminoscala Dall, 1908; † Littoriniscala de Boury, 1887 superseded rank; Scala (Amaea) H. Adams & A. Adams, 1853 (original rank); Scala (Discoscala) Sacco, 1890; † Scala (Littoriniscala) de Boury, 1887; Scalaria (Discoscala) Sacco, 1890; † Scalina Conrad, 1865 (uncertain synonym); † Textiscala de Boury, 1911

= Amaea =

Genus of gastropods

Amaea is a genus of predatory sea snails, marine prosobranch gastropod mollusks in the family Epitoniidae. They are commonly known as wentletraps.

Not to be confused with Amaea Malmgren, 1866, replaced junior synonym of Amaeana, Hartman, 1959; family Terebellidae.

== Description ==
(Described as Scala (Amaea) H. Adams & A. Adams, 1853) The thin, turreted shell shows united, cancellated whorls and a few irregular, thin varices. The aperture is semilunar;. The inner lip is swollen at the center, while the outer lip is thin and unadorned.

(Described as Epitonium (Ferminoscala) Dall, 1908) Spiral whorls in contact, turritelloid and reticulate, featuring a single prominent varix in the fully mature shell. The base lacks an umbilicus but includes a distinct basal disk.

== Species ==
- Amaea africana Bouchet & Tillier, 1978
- Amaea alistairi H. P. Wagner, 1990
- Amaea apexroseus E. F. García, 2003
- Amaea arabica (Nyst, 1873)
- † Amaea asperrima (Cossmann, 1888)
- Amaea aspicienda (Melvill, 1912)
- Amaea boucheti E. F. García, 2003
- † Amaea bowerbankii (J. Morris, 1852)
- Amaea brunneopicta (Dall, 1908)
- Amaea cerea (Masahito, Kuroda & T. Habe, 1971)
- Amaea contexta DuShane, 1970
- † Amaea decussata (Lamarck, 1804)
- Amaea deroyae DuShane, 1970
- Amaea diluta E. F. García, 2003
- Amaea elegantula E. F. García, 2003
- Amaea ferminiana (Dall, 1908)
- Amaea flammea Y.-C. Lee, 2001
- Amaea foulisi Kilburn, 1985
- Amaea gazeoides Kuroda & T. Habe, 1961
- Amaea globularis Bozzetti, 2009
- † Amaea gracillima (Suter, 1917)
- Amaea gratissima (Thiele, 1925)
- Amaea grossicingulata (de Boury, 1913)
- Amaea guineensis Bouchet & Tillier, 1978
- Amaea hedleyi (de Boury, 1912)
- † Amaea inornata (Tate, 1890)
- Amaea iwaotakii M. Azuma, 1961
- Amaea kushimotensis T. Nakayama, 2000
- † Amaea lapparenti (de Boury, 1887)
- † Amaea lemoinei (de Boury, 1883)
- Amaea lennyi E. F. García, 2003
- † Amaea macula Garvie, 1996
- Amaea magnifica (G. B. Sowerby II, 1844)
- Amaea marteli (de Boury, 1913)
- Amaea mathildona (Masahito, Kuroda & T. Habe, 1971)
- Amaea mathildopsis (Barnard, 1963)
- Amaea mitchelli (Dall, 1896)
- Amaea natalis (Barnard, 1963)
- Amaea nebulodermata (Azuma, 1972)
- Amaea noguchii T. Habe & Masuda, 1990
- Amaea ogaitoi Masahito & T. Habe, 1975
- Amaea optata (Jousseaume, 1912)
- Amaea optima (Melvill & Standen, 1903)
- Amaea oyasionensis (Ozaki, 1958)
- Amaea pompholyx (Dall, 1890)
- † Amaea pulcherrima Lozouet, 1999
- Amaea retifera (Dall, 1889)
- Amaea rubigosola Y.-C. Lee, 2001
- † Amaea scaberrima (Michelotti, 1840)
- Amaea secunda Kuroda & Ko. Itô, 1961
- † Amaea septeuilensis (Fenaux, 1938)
- Amaea sericogazea (Masahito, Kuroda & T. Habe, 1971)
- Amaea setonaikaiensis Masahito & T. Habe, 1975
- Amaea solangeae Bozzetti, 2008
- Amaea splendida (de Boury, 1913)
- † Amaea staminea (Contad, 1860)
- Amaea sulcata (G. B. Sowerby II, 1844)
- Amaea tehuanarum DuShane & J. H. McLean, 1968
- Amaea thielei (de Boury, 1913)
- Amaea tosaensis (T. Habe & Masuda, 1990)
- † Amaea triplicata (Tate, 1890)
- † Amaea woodi (Deshayes, 1861)

== Synonyms ==
- Amaea acuminata (G. B. Sowerby II, 1844): synonym of Acrilla acuminata (G. B. Sowerby II, 1844)
- Amaea adenensis (Jousseaume, 1912): synonym of Acrilla minor (G. B. Sowerby II, 1873) (junior subjective synonym)
- Amaea analogica (Barnard, 1963): synonym of Plastiscala analogica (Barnard, 1963)
- Amaea bitaeniata (Masahito & T. Habe, 1976): synonym of Amaea nebulodermata (Azuma, 1972) (junior subjective synonym)
- Amaea decussata (Lamarck, 1804) sensu Kiener, 1838: synonym of Amaea arabica (Nyst, 1873)
- Amaea dorysa (Iredale, 1936): synonym of Narvaliscala dorysa Iredale, 1936
- Amaea fimbriatula (Masahito, Kuroda & T. Habe, 1971): synonym of Cirsotrema fimbriatulum (Masahito, Kuroda & T. Habe, 1971) (superseded combination)
- Amaea fimbriolata (Melvill, 1897): synonym of Cirsotrema fimbriolatum (Melvill, 1897)
- Amaea flindersi (Cotton & Godfrey, 1938): synonym of Narvaliscala flindersi (Cotton & Godfrey, 1938)
- Amaea fusca (G. B. Sowerby II, 1844): synonym of Acrilloscala fusca (G. B. Sowerby II, 1844)
- Amaea gracilis (H. Adams, 1873): synonym of Amaea minor (G. B. Sowerby II, 1873): synonym of Acrilla minor (G. B. Sowerby II, 1873)
- Amaea grimaldii (Dautzenberg & de Boury, 1897): synonym of Cylindriscala jeffreysi (Tryon, 1887)
- Amaea immaculata (G. B. Sowerby II, 1844): synonym of Epitonium immaculatum (G. B. Sowerby II, 1844)
- Amaea kawamurai Azuma, 1960: synonym of Amaea splendida (de Boury, 1913)
- Amaea kieneri (Tapparone Canefri, 1876): synonym of Cirsotrema kieneri Tapparone Canefri, 1876: synonym of Amaea arabica (Nyst, 1873)
- Amaea laidlawi (Melvill & Standen, 1903): synonym of Epitonium laidlawi (Melvill & Standen, 1903)
- Amaea lamyi (de Boury, 1909): synonym of Acrilloscala lamyi (de Boury, 1909)
- Amaea luxa Okutani, 1964: synonym of Periapta polygyrella (P. Fischer, 1897) (dubious synonym)
- Amaea luxus Okutani, 1964: synonym of Periapta polygyrella (P. Fischer, 1897)
- Amaea macrina (Iredale, 1936): synonym of Murdochella macrina Iredale, 1936
- Amaea martinii (W. Wood, 1828): synonym of Filiscala martinii (W. Wood, 1828): synonym of Filiscala raricosta (Lamarck, 1804)
- Amaea minor (G. B. Sowerby II, 1873): synonym of Acrilla minor (G. B. Sowerby II, 1873) (superseded combination)
- † Amaea ojiensis Yokoyama, 1927: synonym of Amaea hedleyi (de Boury, 1912)
- Amaea percancellata T. Nakayama, 2000: synonym of Narvaliscala percancellata (T. Nakayama, 2000)
- Amaea plini de Boury MS (unavailable MS name)
- Amaea smithii (R. B. Watson, 1897): synonym of Epitonium tryoni (de Boury, 1913) (junior homonym)
- Amaea sowerbyi Dunker, 1882: synonym of Amaea arabica (Nyst, 1873)
- Amaea subcancellata M. Azuma, 1962: synonym of Amaea percancellata T. Nakayama, 2000: synonym of Narvaliscala percancellata (T. Nakayama, 2000) (Junior secondary homonym of Scalaria subcancellata (d'Orbigny, 1852); Amaea percancellata is a replacement name)
- † Amaea suroclathrata Stilwell & Zinsmeister, 1992 : synonym of † Cirsotrema suroclathratum (Stilwell & Zinsmeister, 1992)
- Amaea teramachii Kaicher, 1980: synonym of Amaea sericogazea (Masahito, Kuroda & T. Habe, 1971)
- Amaea tosaensis (M. Azuma, 1962): synonym of Epitonium tosaense (M. Azuma, 1962) (superseded combination)
- Amaea trabeculata (A. Adams, 1861): synonym of Cirsotrema trabeculatum (A. Adams, 1861) (superseded combination)
- Amaea turnerae (van Regteren Altena, 1971): synonym of Gyroscala xenicima (Melvill & Standen, 1903)
- Amaea verconis (Cotton, 1939): synonym of Plastiscala verconis (Cotton, 1939)
- Amaea xenicima (Melvill & Standen, 1903): synonym of Gyroscala xenicima (Melvill & Standen, 1903)
- Amaea youngi Kilburn, 1985: synonym of Filiscala youngi (Kilburn, 1985) (original combination)
