= Acirsa morsei =

Scientific classification
- Kingdom: Animalia
- Phylum: Mollusca
- Class: Gastropoda
- Subclass: Caenogastropoda
- Order: incertae sedis
- Family: Epitoniidae
- Genus: Acirsa
- Species: A. morsei

Binomial name
- Acirsa morsei (Yokoyama, 1926)

Synonyms
- Tachyrhynchus septemcostatus Golikov, 1986; Turbonilla morsei Yokoyama, 1926

Species of gastropod

Acirsa morsei is a species of sea snail, a marine gastropod mollusk in the family Epitoniidae.
