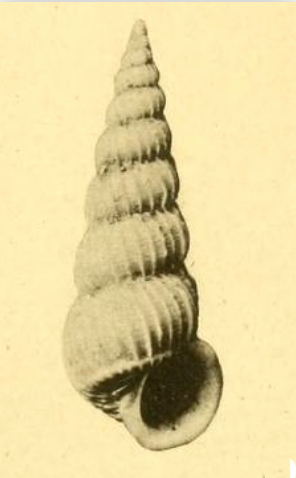
- Shell of Amaea hedleyi (holotype)

Scientific classification
- Kingdom: Animalia
- Phylum: Mollusca
- Class: Gastropoda
- Subclass: Caenogastropoda
- Order: incertae sedis
- Family: Epitoniidae
- Genus: Amaea
- Species: A. hedleyi

Binomial name
- Amaea hedleyi (de Boury, 1912)

Synonyms
- Acirsa hedleyi (de Boury, 1912); Acrilla hedleyi (de Boury, 1912) (superseded combination); † Amaea ojiensis Yokoyama, 1927; Scala (Acrilla) hedleyi de Boury, 1913 (superseded combination); Scala hedleyi de Boury, 1913 (superseded combination)

= Amaea hedleyi =

Species of gastropod

Amaea hedleyi is a species of predatory sea snails, marine prosobranch gastropod mollusks in the family Epitoniidae.

== Description ==
The length of the shell attains 10 mm, its diameter 3 mm

(Original description in French) The white shell is conical and moderately elongated. It shows thin, sharp, slightly raised ribs and rather thick transverse cords. A circumbasal cord defines a well-visible disc. The suture is quite deep, widely open, and imperforate.

The protoconch is partially broken in the holotype but preserved in the juvenile specimen, showing 3 smooth whorls with an obtuse apex. The 9 1/2 subsequent whorls are convex and show very slightly oblique, tightly spaced, thin, sharp, and slightly raised longitudinal ribs that are not auriculate. These ribs bend rather sharply near the suture, connecting with the lower ends of the ribs from the previous whorl. Between these ribs, one observes rather thick transverse cords that do not extend over the ribs. These cords are slightly raised and separated by nearly equal spaces. The body whorl has 23 ribs, two of which, near the outer lip, especially one, transform into fairly thick varices. The base is barely convex, circumscribed by a distinct cord that defines a disc, across which the ribs extend to reach the columella. These ribs bend sharply as they pass over the circumbasal cord and become much smaller on the disc, which is almost devoid of the cords present on the rest of the shell. The columella is accompanied by a fairly elongated funiculus, swollen in the middle and well developed.

The aperture is rounded, very slightly subquadrangular. The inner peristome is reduced to a very thin sheet, visible only in the juvenile, but destroyed in the adult at the entrance of the aperture, where only the two edges are visible. The outer peristome is discontinuous and fairly thick, with barely a trace of auricles at both ends, the anterior part near the columella being slightly sloping.

== Distribution ==
This marine species occurs off Japan and Australia.
