= Amaea gratissima =

Scientific classification
- Kingdom: Animalia
- Phylum: Mollusca
- Class: Gastropoda
- Subclass: Caenogastropoda
- Order: incertae sedis
- Family: Epitoniidae
- Genus: Amaea
- Species: A. gratissima

Binomial name
- Amaea gratissima (Thiele, 1925)

Synonyms
- Eccliseogyra gratissima (Thiele, 1925); Scala gratissima Thiele, 1925 (original combination)

Species of gastropod

Amaea gratissima is a species of predatory sea snails, marine prosobranch gastropod mollusks in the family Epitoniidae.

== Distribution ==
This marine species occurs in the Indian Ocean close to Dar es Salaam, Tanzania.
