= Acirsa pratoma =

Scientific classification
- Kingdom: Animalia
- Phylum: Mollusca
- Class: Gastropoda
- Subclass: Caenogastropoda
- Order: incertae sedis
- Family: Epitoniidae
- Genus: Acirsa
- Species: A. pratoma

Binomial name
- Acirsa pratoma (Dall, 1919)

Synonyms
- Tachyrhynchus pratomus Dall, 1919

Species of gastropod

Acirsa pratoma is a species of sea snail, a marine gastropod mollusk in the family Turritellidae.
