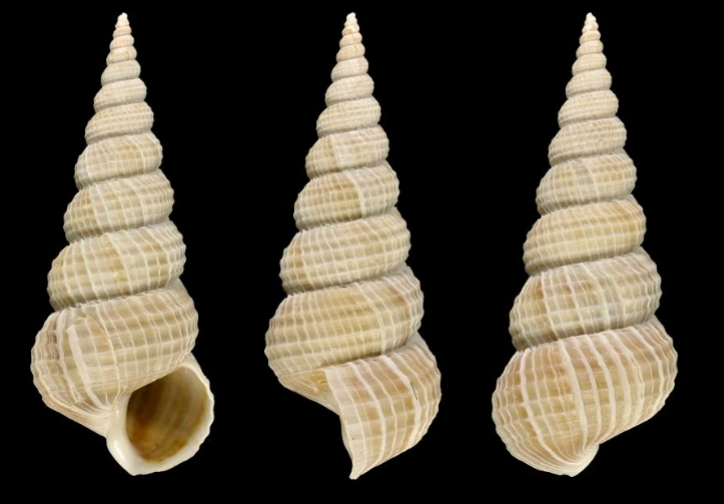
- Shell of Amaea ferminiana (holotype at the Smithsonian Institution)

Scientific classification
- Kingdom: Animalia
- Phylum: Mollusca
- Class: Gastropoda
- Subclass: Caenogastropoda
- Order: incertae sedis
- Family: Epitoniidae
- Genus: Amaea
- Species: A. ferminiana

Binomial name
- Amaea ferminiana (Dall, 1908)

Synonyms
- Acrilla weigandi (Böse, 1910) † junior subjective synonym; Epitonium (Ferminoscala) ferminianum Dall, 1908 superseded combination; Epitonium ferminianum Dall, 1908 (superseded combination); Scala (Acrilla) weigandi Böse, 1910 † junior subjective synonym; Scalina weigandi (Bose, 1910) junior subjective synonym; Environment

= Amaea ferminiana =

Species of gastropod

Amaea ferminiana is a species of predatory sea snails, marine prosobranch gastropod mollusks in the family Epitoniidae.

== Description ==
The shell grows to a length of 38 mm, its maximum diameter is 17 mm.

(Original description) The shell is large, solid, and acute, with eleven or more closely adherent whorls. It exhibits a livid flesh color that fades to white, with the terminal varix being distinctly white. The surface is dull and unpolished. The axial sculpture consists of numerous low, small, sharp lamellae, which are slightly more prominent before the suture on the last two whorls. These lamellae are reticulated by about six prominent, flattened spiral threads with wider interspaces, containing much finer spiral threads. The basal disk is similarly covered with closely set, very fine spiral threads, with the suture positioned along its posterior margin. The aperture is rounded and slightly patulous in line with the axis, and in fully mature shells, a thick, white varicose peritreme is bevelled away from the aperture towards the thicker portion of the varix behind.

== Distribution ==
This marine species occurs in Panama Bay; also off Mexico and Colombia.
