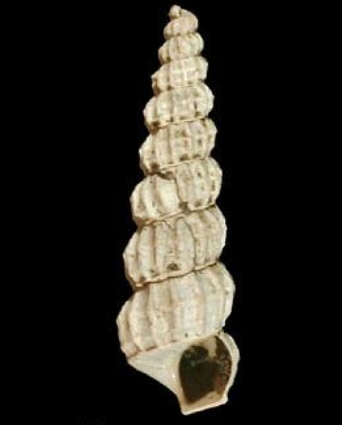
- Shell of Amaea arabica (specimen at the Natural History Museum, Rotterdam)

Scientific classification
- Kingdom: Animalia
- Phylum: Mollusca
- Class: Gastropoda
- Subclass: Caenogastropoda
- Order: incertae sedis
- Family: Epitoniidae
- Genus: Amaea
- Species: A. arabica

Binomial name
- Amaea arabica (Nyst, 1873)

Synonyms
- Amaea decussata (Lamarck, 1804) sensu Kiener, 1838; Amaea kieneri (Tapparone Canefri, 1876); Amaea sowerbyi Dunker, 1882; Cirsotrema kieneri Tapparone Canefri, 1876; Elegantiscala kieneri (Tapparone Canefri, 1876); Scalaria arabica Nyst, 1873 (original combination)

= Amaea arabica =

Species of gastropod

Amaea arabica is a species of predatory sea snails, marine prosobranch gastropod mollusks in the family Epitoniidae.

== Taxonomy ==
Kiener (1838) and G.B. Sowerby II (1844) recorded this Recent species under the name "Scalaria decussata Lamarck, 1804", originally established for a fossil species from the Eocene of the Paris Basin. The names Scalaria arabica and Amaea sowerbyi were both established for Sowerby's "Scalaria decussata" (and are thus objective synonyms), and the name Cirsotrema kieneri was established for Kiener's "Scalaria decussata" (and is thus a subjective synonym).

== Description ==
The shell grows to a length of 25 mm.

== Distribution ==
This marine species occurs in the Red Sea, in the Indian Ocean south to Mauritius; off Australia (Northern Territory, Queensland, Western Australia).
