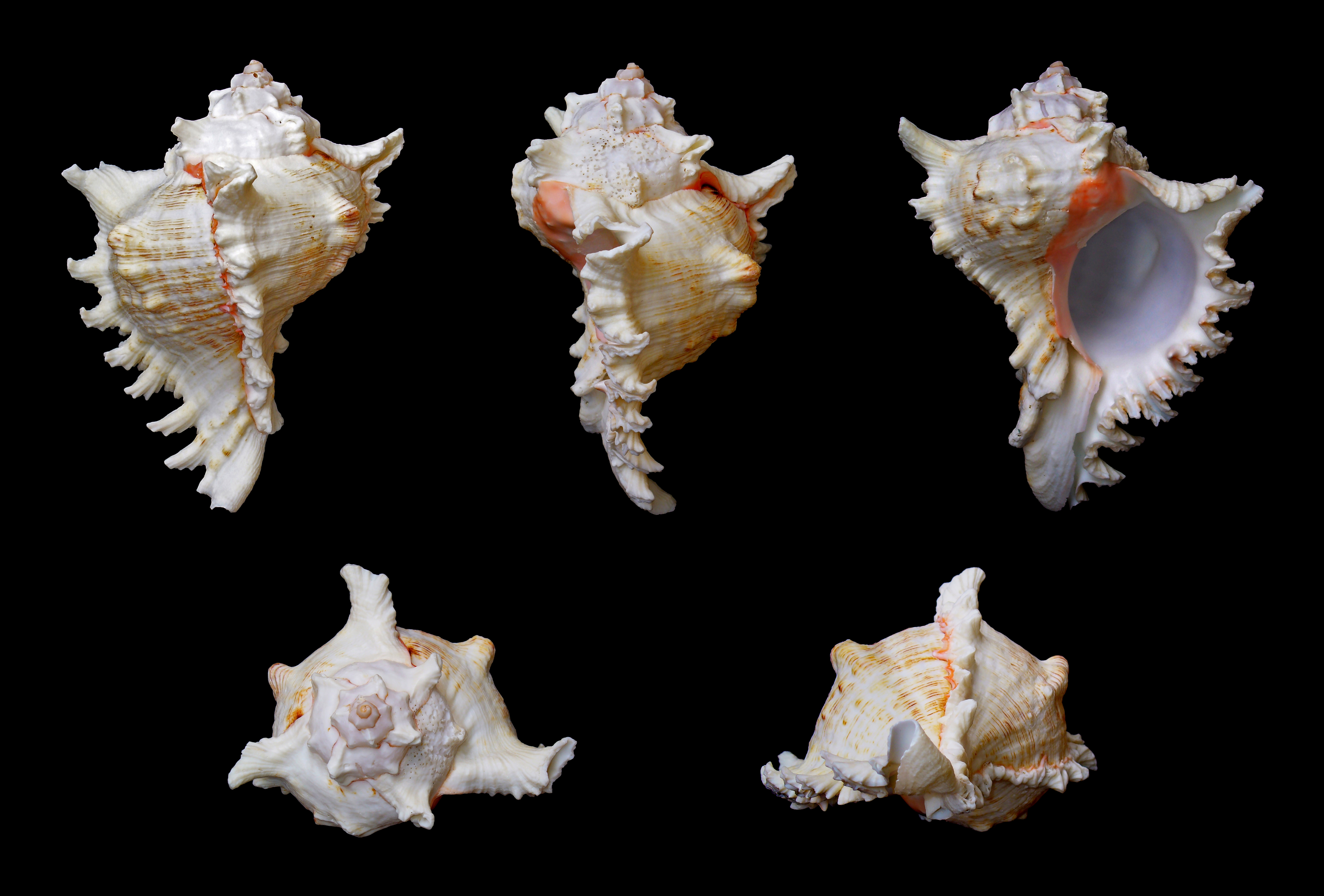
- Different views of a shell of Chicoreus ramosus

Scientific classification
- Kingdom: Animalia
- Phylum: Mollusca
- Class: Gastropoda
- Subclass: Caenogastropoda
- Order: Neogastropoda
- Family: Muricidae
- Genus: Chicoreus
- Species: C. ramosus

Binomial name
- Chicoreus ramosus (Linnaeus, 1758)

Synonyms
- Chicoreus (Chicoreus) ramosus (Linnaeus, 1758); Murex fortispinna François, 1891; Murex frondosus sensu Martini Mørch, 1852; Murex inflatus Lamarck, 1822; Murex ramosus Linnaeus, 1758; Purpura fusiformis Röding, 1798; Purpura incarnata Röding, 1758

= Chicoreus ramosus =

Species of gastropod

Chicoreus ramosus, common name the ramose murex or branched murex, is a species of predatory sea snail, a marine gastropod mollusk in the family Muricidae, the murex snails. It is considered an economically important species in the Indo-West Pacific, especially in India.

== Distribution ==
This sea snail is found widely spread in the Indo-West Pacific, and occurs from east to South Africa, including Mozambique, Tanzania, Madagascar, the Red Sea, the Gulf of Oman, Aldabra, Chagos and Mauritius. It also occurs in eastern Polynesia, southern Japan, New Caledonia and Queensland in Australia.

== Shell description ==
C. ramosus has a large, solid, very rugged and heavy shell, of up to 330 mm in length. It has a relatively globose outline, possessing a short spire, a slightly inflated body whorl, and a moderately long siphonal canal. One of its most striking ornamentations are the conspicuous, leaf-like, recurved hollow digitations. It also presents three spinose axial varices per whorl, with two elongated nodes between them. The shell is coloured white to light brown externally, with a white aperture, generally pink towards the inner edge, the outer lip and the columella.

== Ecology ==
=== Habitat ===
The Ramose murex inhabits sandy and rubble bottoms near coral reefs, to depths of around 10 m.

=== Feeding habits ===
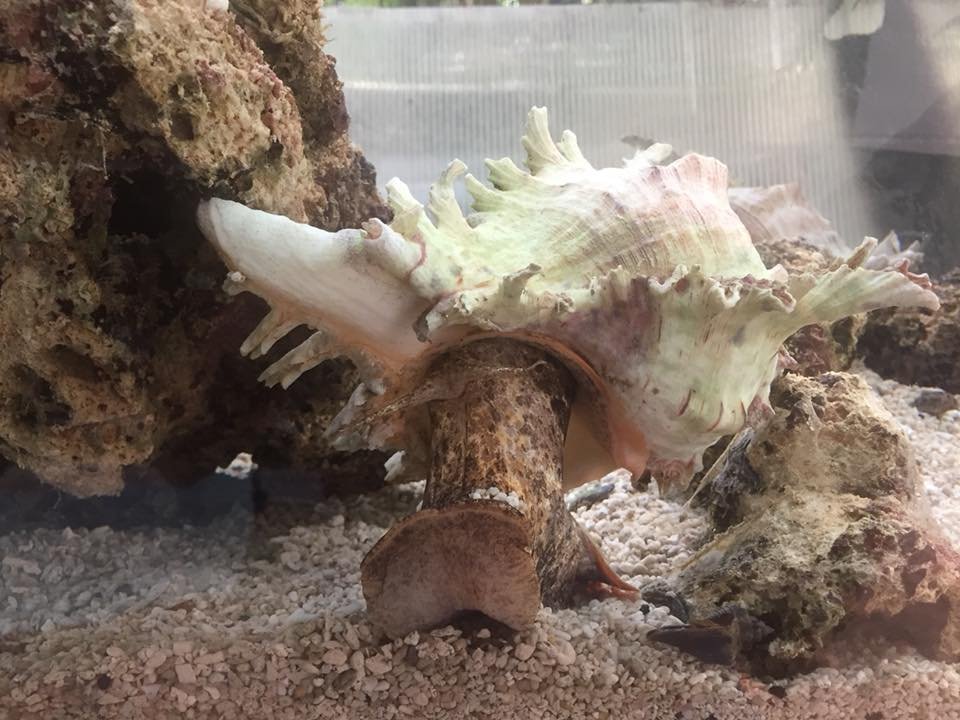
Live Chicoreus ramosus

As is the case in other Muricidae, C. ramosus is a carnivorous predatory species, usually feeding on bivalves and other gastropods.
