= Prosobranchia =

Historic group of molluscs

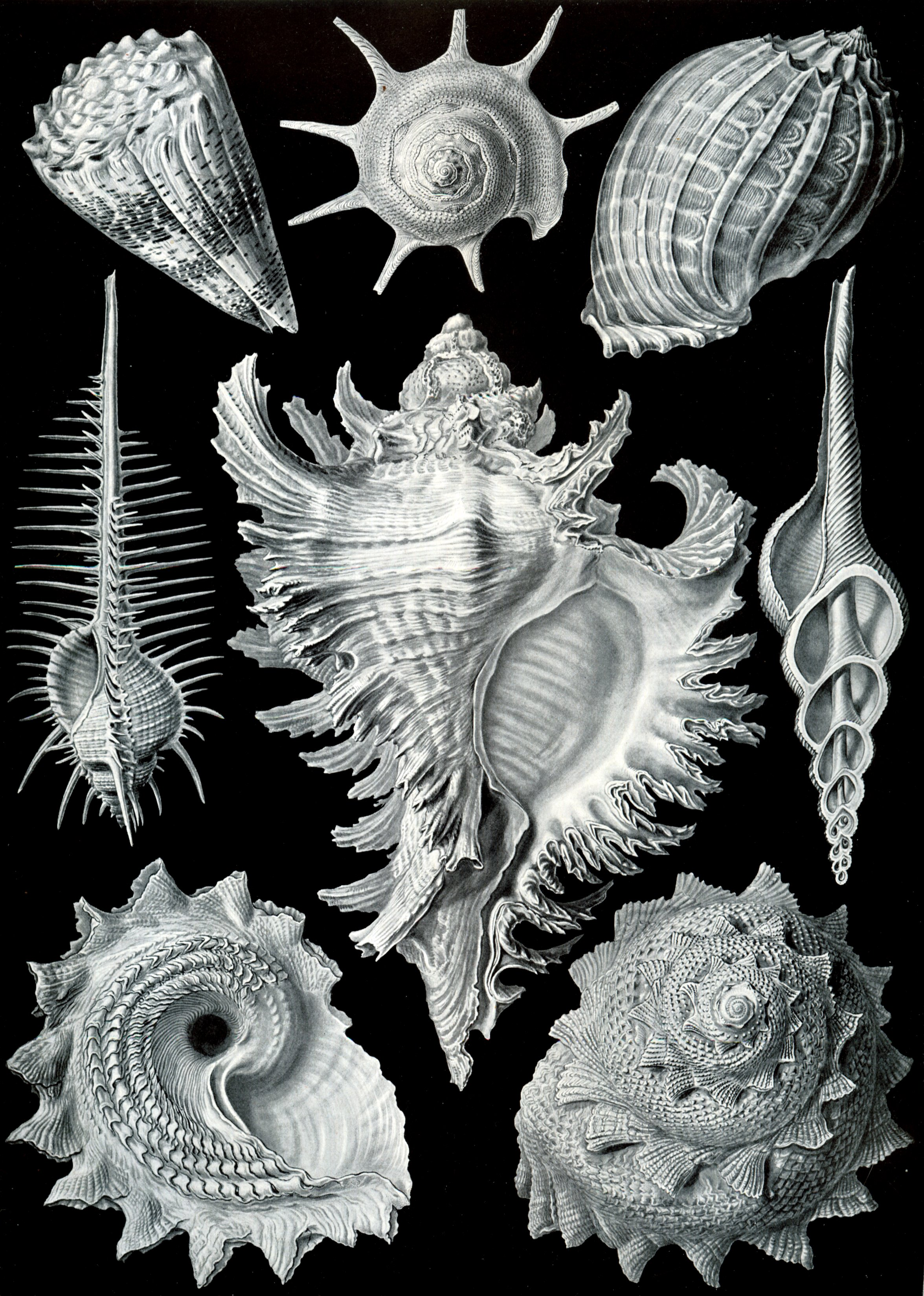
Shells from a variety of prosobranch gastropods, from Ernst Haeckel's Artforms of Nature, 1904.

Prosobranchia (Note: Meaning gills in front (of the heart), in contrast to "opisthobranch" means gills behind (and to the right of the heart).) was a large taxonomic subclass of gastropods, which included sea snails, land snails and freshwater snails. This taxon dates back to the 1920s, but has since been proven to be polyphyletic (consisting of more than one lineage of descent). In biology taxonomy must reflect phylogeny and monophyletic groups are preferred; in other words, the classification of a group must reflect its evolutionary descent as far as that is known through studies of Morphology (biology) and genetic analysis, and must include a common ancestor and all of its descendants. Therefore, the taxon Prosobranchia with its multiple evolutionary origins is no longer considered suitable to be used.

One can still encounter this subclass used as if it is still valid in many texts and websites. Although Prosobranchia is no longer generally accepted as a taxon by people who study living Mollusca, still the term prosobranch is legitimately used as an anatomically descriptive adjective or noun, and the taxon Prosobranchia is still sometimes used by paleontologists.

The majority of marine gastropods are prosobranch, as are a few land snails and freshwater snails. The prosobranch gastropods include the majority of marine snails, among them conches, cones, cowries, limpets, murexes, periwinkles, volutes and whelks, as well as numerous freshwater groups, and some land snails with an operculum. Prosobranchs have their gills, mantle cavity and anus situated in front of their heart. Most prosobranchs have separate sexes.

== Description ==
The majority of prosobranchs have an operculum, a corneous or calcareous plate situated on the dorsal surface of the foot. In many prosobranchs, the animal can completely close the aperture with the operculum.

The nervous system of prosobranchs is twisted into a figure 8 due to a developmental process known as torsion. The eyes are situated at the base of the tentacles.

== Taxonomic context ==
The taxonomy of the gastropods is changing rapidly. The old classification (Johannes Thiele) divided Gastropoda into three subclasses: Prosobranchia, Opisthobranchia and Pulmonata. The subclass Prosobranchia (Henri Milne-Edwards) was further divided into the orders Archaeogastropoda, Mesogastropoda and Neogastropoda. The new version of the gastropod classification is explained in Taxonomy of the Gastropoda (Ponder & Lindberg, 1997).

Former prosobranch molluscs

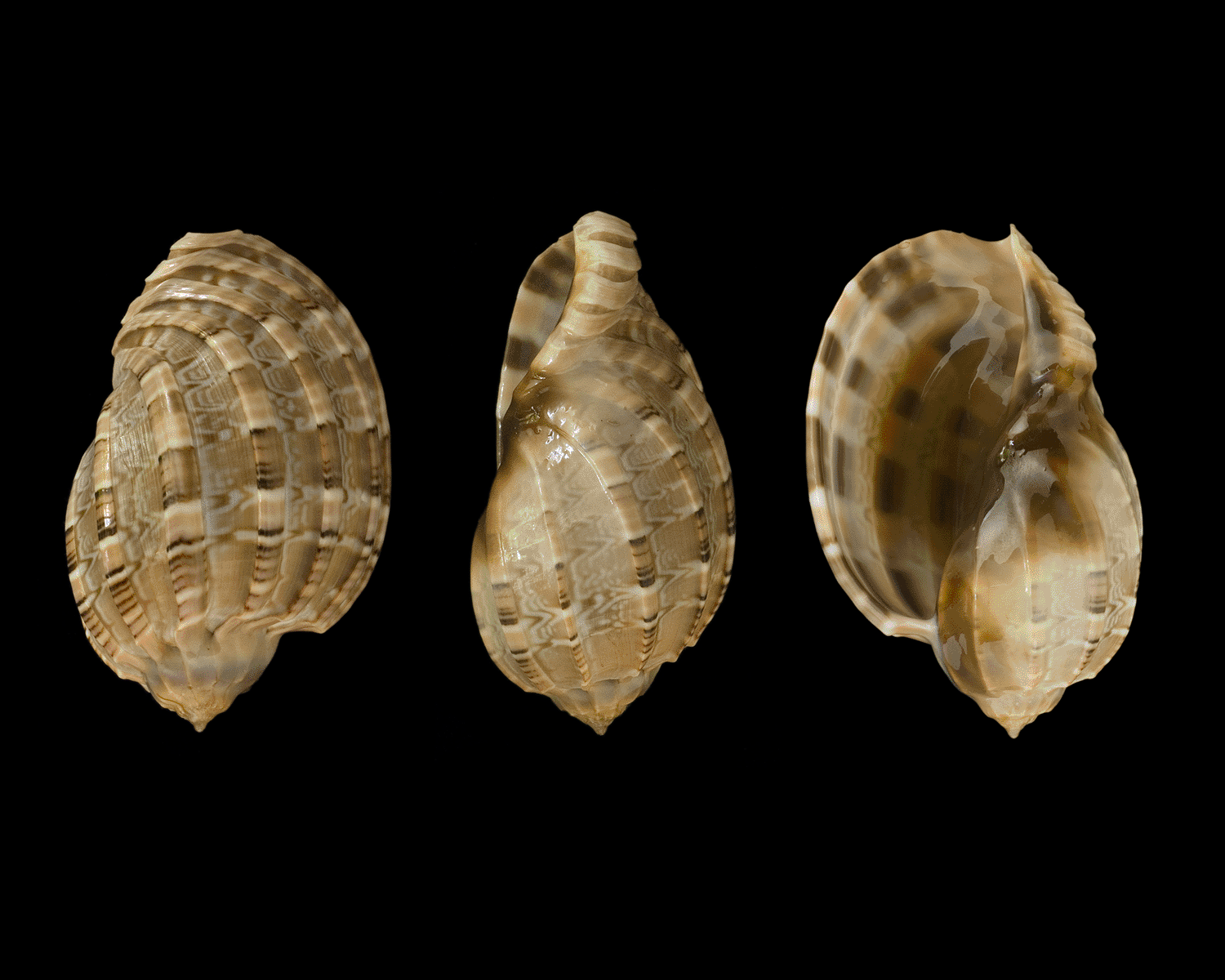
Three views of the shell of a Harpa sp., now considered a caenogastropod

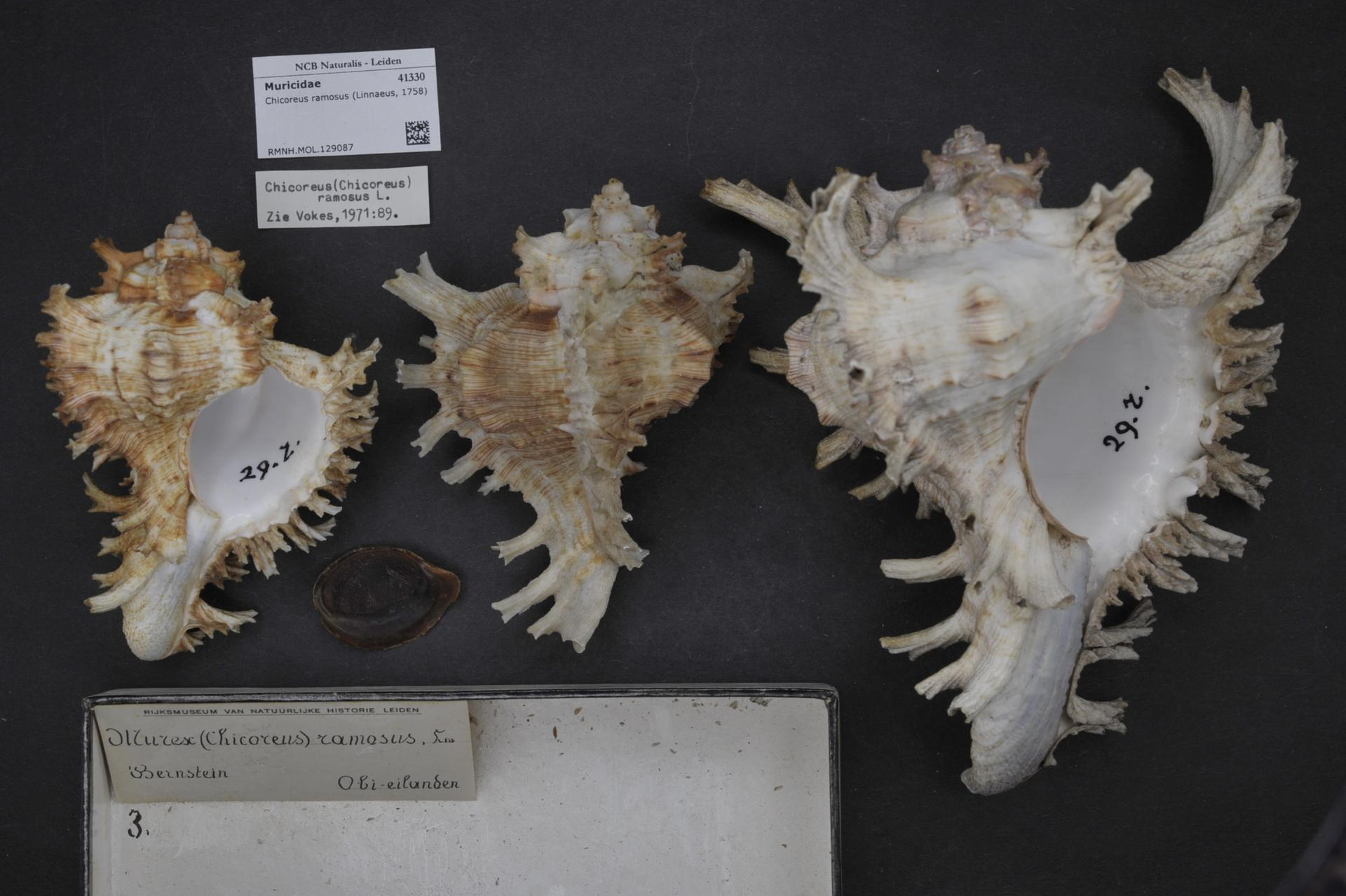
Chicoreus ramosus shells, another caenogastropod
