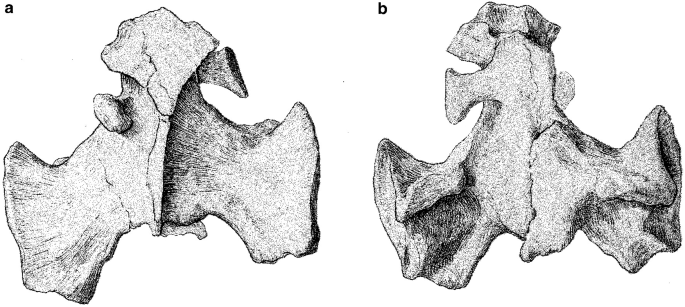
- Holotype fragment of the braincase in dorsal (a) and ventral (b) views

Scientific classification
- Kingdom: Animalia
- Phylum: Chordata
- Class: Reptilia
- Order: Testudines
- Suborder: Pleurodira
- Family: †Bothremydidae
- Genus: †Apertotemporalis; Stromer, 1934
- Species: †A. baharijensis

Binomial name
- †Apertotemporalis baharijensis Stromer, 1934

= Apertotemporalis =

Apertotemporalis Temporal range: Late Cretaceous, Cenomanian

Genus of turtles

Apertotemporalis (from the Latin aperto "open" and temporalis, in reference to the temporal fenestra) is a dubious genus of bothremydid turtle that lived in present-day Egypt during the Late Cretaceous period. It was described by German paleontologist Ernst Stromer in 1934. The genus contains a single species, A. baharijensis, named on the basis of a fragmentary skull. This fossil was unearthed by Austro-Hungarian paleontologist Richard Markgraf during an expedition to the Bahariya Oasis in western Egypt, in rock from the Bahariya Formation. This formation dates to the Cenomanian stage of the Late Cretaceous, which lasted from 101 to 94 million years ago. This skull was destroyed in 1944 during the Bombing of Munich in World War II.

Its holotype skull was very poorly preserved, and only contained much of the braincase and a fragment of the anterior (front) region of the skull. Like that of other bothremydids, the skull was wide and low, measuring 9.6 centimeters (3.8 in) in width and 4 centimeters (1.6 in) in height. The skull was thought to bear distinguishing characteristics by Stromer, however later paleontologists have considered the skull undiagnostic due to its worn and fragmentary condition, leading it to be declared a nomen dubium.

Apertotemporalis is a member of the Bothremydidae, a family of side-necked turtles. It is the former type genus of the family Apertotemporalidae, however this name is no longer in use. The genus coexisted with other turtles such as an indeterminate araripemydid, chelonioidean, and bothremydid, along with giant fishes like Mawsonia and Paranogmius, large crocodylomorphs like Stomatosuchus, and a host of dinosaurs like Spinosaurus, Paralititan, and Tameryraptor. During the Cenomanian, the Bahariya Formation was on the margin of the Tethys Sea, and represented a large network of mangrove swamps, rivers, and tidal flats.

== Discovery and research history ==
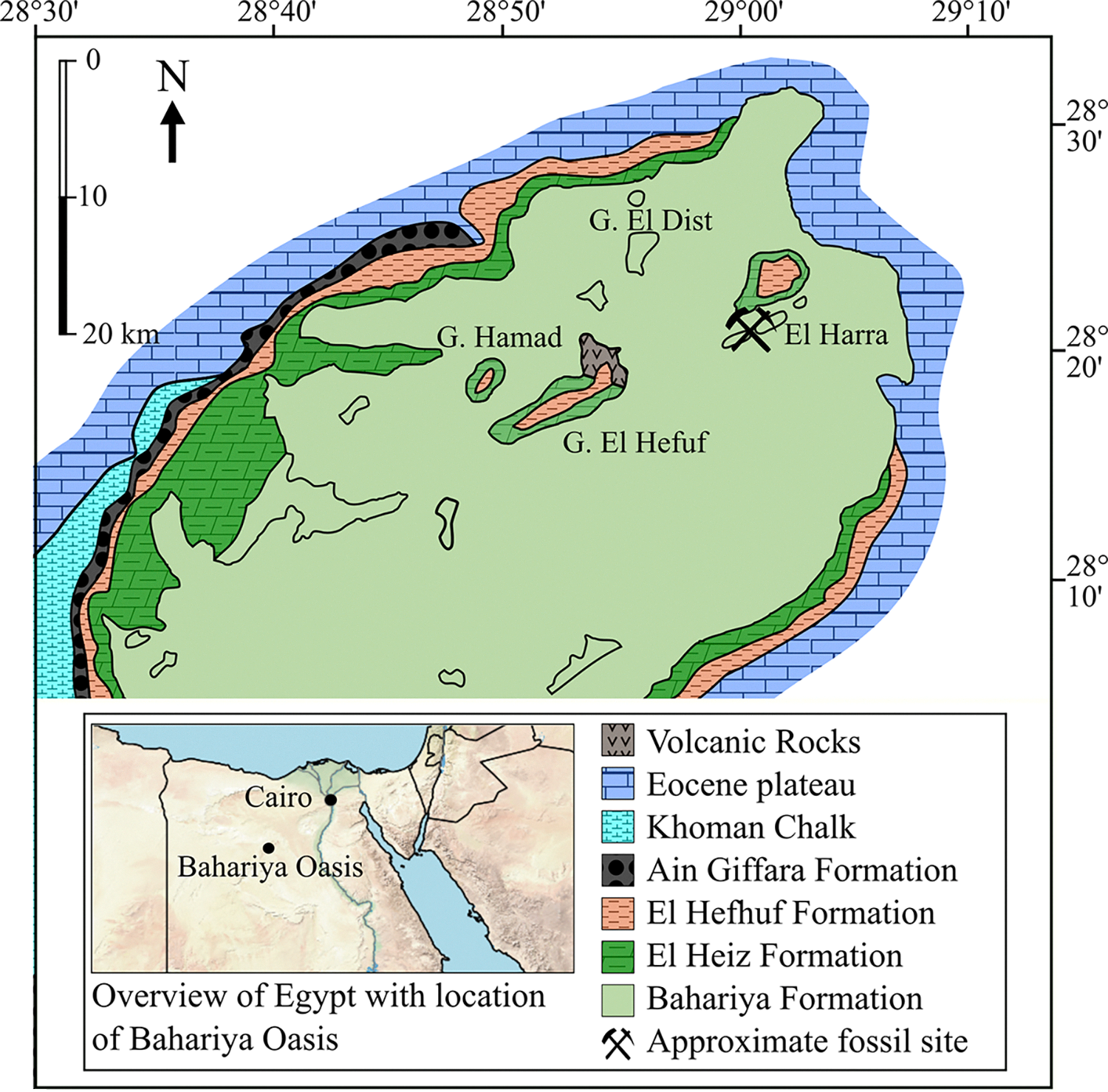
Geologic map of the Bahariya Oasis; Apertotemporalis fossils were found at the G. El Dist site

The first fossils of this taxon were unearthed in 1912 by Austro-Hungarian paleontologist Richard Markgraf in the Bahariya Oasis in the western desert of Egypt, with financial backing from German paleontologist Ernst Stromer and the Paläontologisches Museum München (Bavarian State Collection of Paleontology). The remains, consisting of an incomplete skull in three pieces, were found at the Gebel El Dist locality in a stretch of greyish sandy mudstone at the base of the outcrop. These mudstones derive from the Bahariya Formation, which contains strata dating to the Cenomanian stage of the Late Cretaceous period. In 1934, Stromer scientifically described the skull (cataloged as NR 1912 VIII 93), and identified it as a new genus and species of turtle, Apertotemporalis baharijensis. The generic name Apertotemporalis comes from the Latin aperto "open" and temporalis (in reference to the temporal fenestra). The specific name baharijensis is in reference to the Bahariya Oasis and the Bahariya Formation where it was discovered. The poorly preserved holotype specimen (a specimen used when naming a new species) consisted of two larger skull fragments that formed the braincase, and a third smaller fragment from the anterior (front) portion of the skull. However, this fragment cannot be confidently associated with the other two pieces.

During the night of 24–25 April 1944, the Paläontologisches Museum München was severely damaged during the British bombing of Munich in World War II. The holotype of Apertotemporalis was destroyed in the attack. Due to personal and political tensions between Stromer and the museum's curator, who was a fervent Nazi, the fossils were not rehoused prior to the bombing. Stromer's finds, including Apertotemporalis, received little academic or public attention. Since their destruction, no other fossils have been assigned to the genus. In 1946, German paleontologist Oskar Kuhn classified it in its own family within Pleurosternoidea named Apertotemporalidae, which was later thought to include the genus Chitracephalus as well. This clade was thought to be united by their large skulls and open temporal regions, however the name has not seen use in recent decades.

=== Later analysis ===
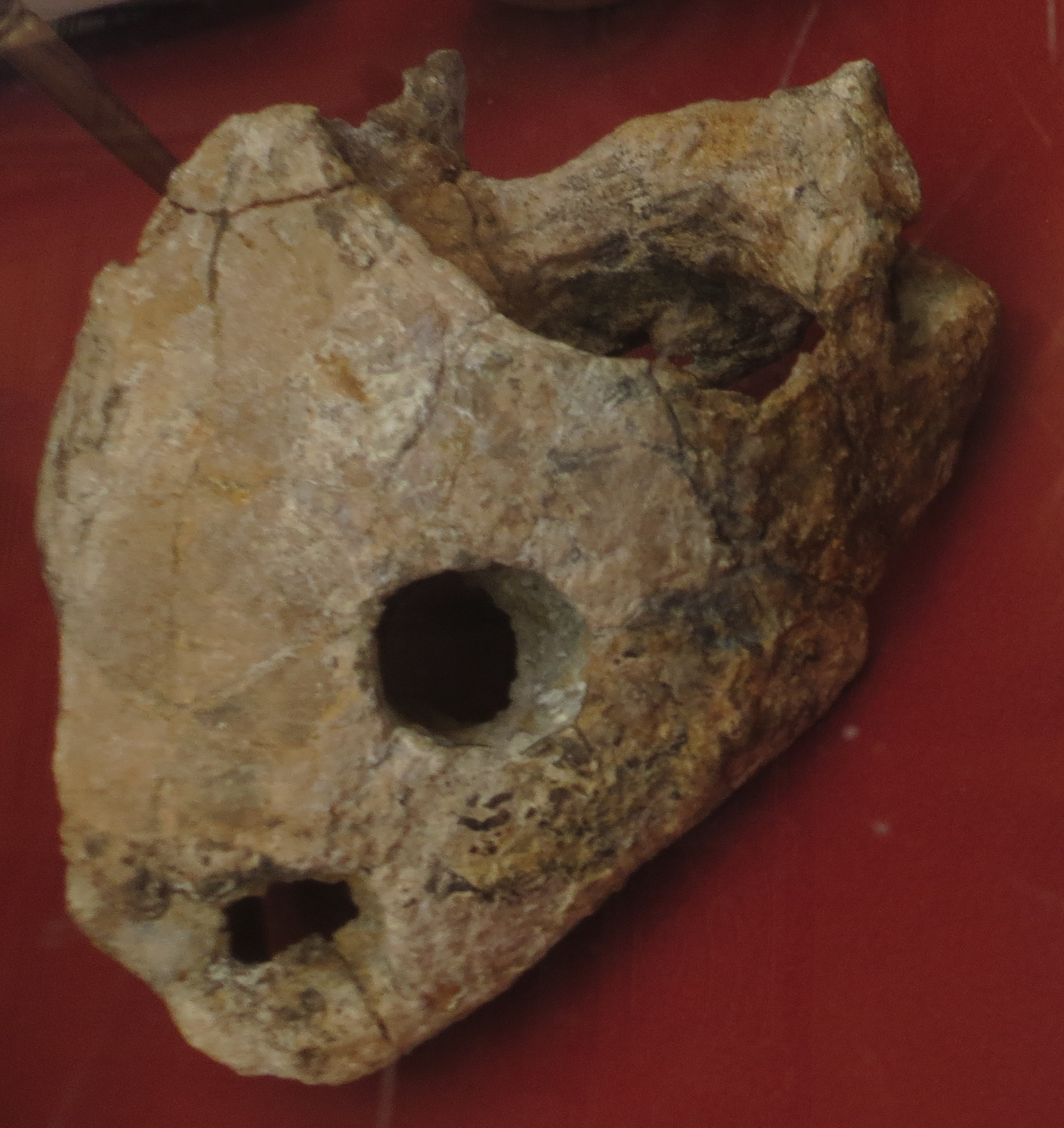
A skull of Nigeremys, another bothremydid

In 1988, French paleontologist France de Lapparent de Broin classified Apertotemporalis as a member of Bothremydidae alongside a number of other Cretaceous North African pleurodirans like Nigeremys. This assessment was followed by a 1988 paper by de Broin and Portuguese researcher Miguel Telles Antunes, which speculated that Apertotemporalis was the African ancestor of later Bothremydids like Rosasia and that it was closely related to "Bothremys" (now Algorachelys) parva. This study also dated Apertotemporalis to the Albian stage, rather than the accepted Cenomanian. Alternatively, in their 1998 description of Zolhafah, de Broin and French paleontologist Christa Werner assigned Apertotemporalis to a subfamily in Bothremydidae they nicknamed the "Nigeremys group". According to the authors, this clade consisted of Apertotemporalis, Nigeremys, and Sokotochelys, which were united by skull features such as an enlarged snout and an enlarged trochlear process behind the ear. The cladogram from Antunes and de Broin's 1988 paper can be seen below, with some unnamed bothremydids not included:

- Pelomedusoides
  - Pelomedusidae
  - - Podocnemididae
    - Bothremydidae
      - Apodichelys
      - Apertotemporalis
      - Madagascar taxon A
      - Madagascar taxon B
      - - - Bothremys
          - Rosasia
        - - Nigeremys
          - Sokotochelys
        - - Taphrosphys
          - Elochelys

In their 2006 comprehensive review of pleurodiran turtles, American paleontologist Eugene Gaffney and colleagues stated that Apertotemporalis should be considered a nomen nudum or nomen dubium based on the fact that the skull was destroyed in World War II, it was very poorly preserved due to weathering and damage, and that the skull itself has no diagnostic characteristics that distinguish it from other taxa. Additionally, Gaffney and colleagues stated that the skull only bears one characteristic of bothremydids, a fully enclosed "incisura columellae auris" (a notch in the quadrate bone of turtles), which is also found in other families. The authors closed by stating that the skull was so poorly preserved that the other Egyptian bothremydid Arenila could be the same taxon as Apertotemporalis, but due to the latter's inadequate preservation it is impossible to be sure. Several later authors have stated that Apertotemporalis is a nomen dubium within Bothremydidae or, alternatively, is a nomen nudum and not a valid taxon.

== Description ==
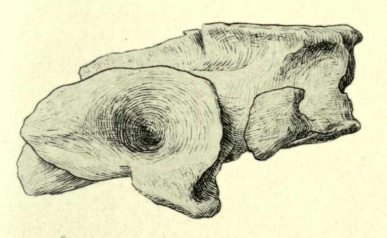
The holotype in lateral (side) view

The skull of the Apertotemporalis holotype was 9.6 centimeters (3.8 in) wide at the ear regions and only 4 centimeters (1.6 in) tall from the base to the top of the skull roof. Assuming proportions similar to those of Orbitia borneensis, the carapace of Apertotemporalis was 50 centimeters (20 in) long. However, Stromer noted that the holotype of Apertotemporalis was not associated with any carapace fragments and that the proportions of turtles vary widely, making these estimates tentative. The left side of the skull was gravely damaged, which Stromer speculated was due to pathologies.

From dorsal (top) view, a small crest was visible on the parietal (back cranium) bones that was similar to those of Testudo and Trionyx, though the extent of this crest was impossible to determine. This skull lacks a temporal roof or temporal arches, creating an opening in the temporal for a visible temporal fenestra. Additionally, this crest forms further posteriorly (hindwards) in Apertotemporalis than in other genera like Terrapene carolina. The pterygoid bones were flat and narrow, with a hook-shaped ectopterygoid process on their distal (outer) sides. This pronounced ectopterygoid process suggests that Apertotemporalis had a powerful bite.

== Palaeoenvironment ==
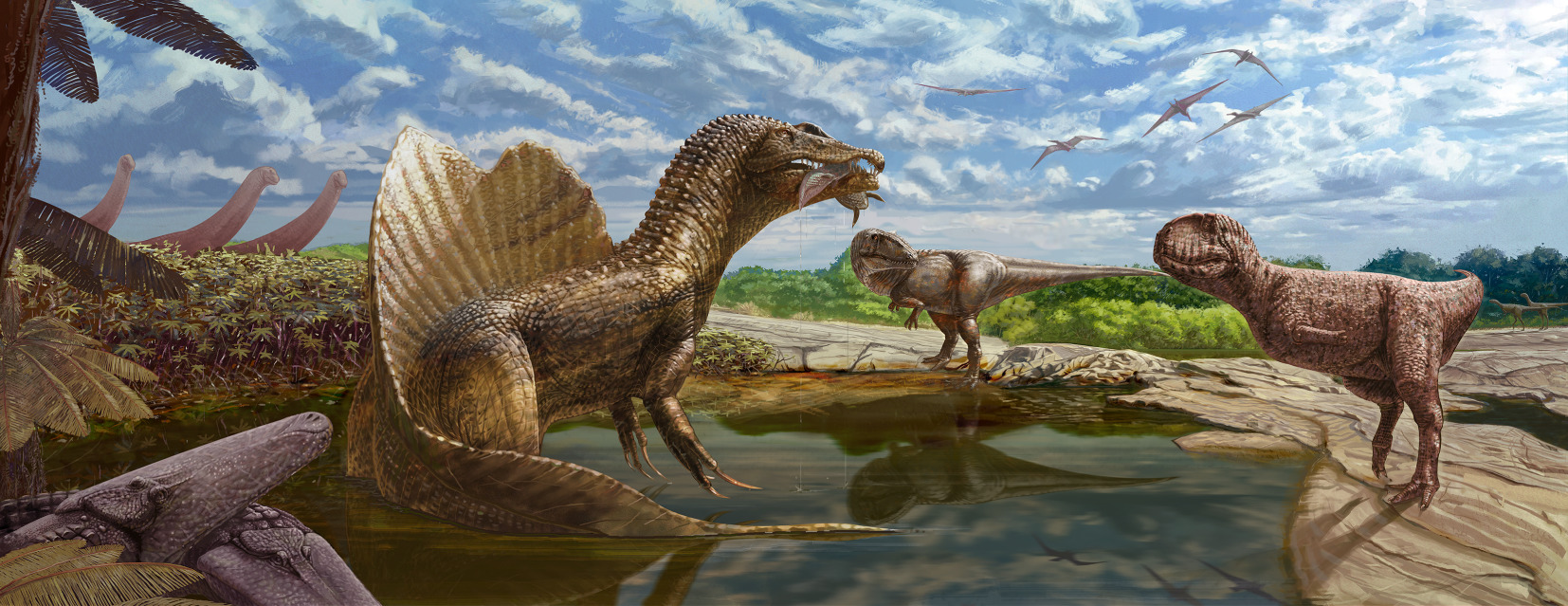
Restoration of fauna of the Bahariya Formation

The discovery of Apertotemporalis in the Bahariya Formation indicates that bothremydids could inhabit marine-littoral environments, such as brackish lagoons and freshwater streams. Bothremydids' adaptations to saltwater environments like these facilitated their spread, with members of the family known from nearly every continent by the climax of the Cretaceous. Bothremydid diets are very diverse, with taxa being omnivorous, piscivorous, or carnivorous, aiding them in achieving their wide distribution. In a 2022 book, Egyptian researcher Jamale Ijouiher stated that Apertotemporalis was a generalist omnivore. However, bothremydids never developed the paddle limbs found in oceanic turtles like chelonioideans, restricting them from traveling across deep open oceans. North Africa, during the Cenomanian stage of the Late Cretaceous, bordered the Tethys Sea, and was a mangrove-dominated coastal environment filled with vast tidal flats and waterways. Fossils of terrestrial and freshwater animals, including those of Apertotemporalis, were largely found in a lower layer of the Bahariya Formation whereas those of marine animals like plesiosaurs are more common in upper layers of the formation, indicating a change in the environment to a marine depositional one. Apertotemporalis was the first turtle described and the only one named from the Bahariya Formation, however indeterminate taxa from the families Araripemydidae, Chelonioidea, Trionychia, Chelyidae, Pelomedusidae, and Bothremydidae have been described.

A diverse fauna of other animals is known from the Bahariya Formation. Underwater life diversity exploded during this period in the mangroves of North Africa, represented by genera like the bony fish Mawsonia and Paranogmius, sawskates Onchopristis and Schizorhiza, sharks like Squalicorax and Cretolamna, and a variety of invertebrates. Non-dinosaurian reptiles such as the early sea snake Simoliophis, several indeterminate plesiosaurs, crocodylomorphs like the stomatosuchid Stomatosuchus and the eunotosuchian Libycosuchus, and an indeterminate pterosaur are also known from the formation. Dinosaurs are represented by the sauropods Aegyptosaurus, Paralititan, and an indeterminate titanosaur, the theropods Spinosaurus, Tameryraptor, Bahariasaurus, an indeterminate abelisaurid, and possibly Sigilmassasaurus and Deltadromeus.
