= 2016 in reptile paleontology =

This list of fossil reptiles described in 2016 is a list of new taxa of fossil reptiles that were described during the year 2016, as well as other significant discoveries and events related to reptile paleontology that occurred in 2016.

== Lepidosaurs ==
=== Lizards ===
==== Research ====
- Twelve specimens of lizards (including stem-gekkotans, crown-agamids, a lacertid, a putative stem-chamaeleonid and squamates of uncertain phylogenetic placement, probably stem-squamates) are described from the Cretaceous (Albian-Cenomanian boundary) amber from Myanmar by Daza et al. (2016); however, the supposed stem-chamaeleonid is subsequently reinterpreted as an albanerpetontid amphibian by Matsumoto & Evans (2018).
- A study of almost 30 specimens of Polyglyphanodon sternbergi, including almost complete skeletons, is published by Simões et al. (2016), who report the discovery of previously unrecognized ontogenetic series, sexual dimorphism and a complete lower temporal bar in the skull of members of this species.
- New anatomical data on the Late Cretaceous lizard Slavoia darevskii is published by Tałanda (2016), who interprets it as a stem-amphisbaenian.
- A study on the skull anatomy of the Eocene amphisbaenian Spathorhynchus fossorium is published by Müller, Hipsley & Maisano (2016).
- A study on mosasaur tooth implantation and its phylogenetic implications is published by Liu et al. (2016).
- A redescription of the mosasaur Hainosaurus bernardi Dollo (1885) is published by Jimenez-Huidobro & Caldwell (2016), who transfer this species to the genus Tylosaurus and synonymize genera Tylosaurus and Hainosaurus.
- A revision of the species assigned to the mosasaur genus Tylosaurus is published by Jiménez-Huidobro, Simões & Caldwell (2016); their conclusion that T. kansasensis is a junior synonym of T. nepaeolicus is subsequently rejected by Stewart & Mallon (2018).
- Early Miocene chamaeleonid fossils, including a specimen tentatively attributed to the species Chamaeleo cf. andrusovi Čerňanský (2010), previously known only from the early Miocene of the Czech Republic, are described from the Aliveri locality (Euboea, Greece) by Georgalis, Villa & Delfino (2016).
- Lizard fossils which might be the oldest known chameleon fossils from India are described from the Miocene Nagri Formation by Sankhyan & Čerňanský (2016).

==== New taxa ====
Name	Novelty	Status	Authors	Age	Unit	Location	Notes	Images
Bagaluus	Gen. et sp. nov	Valid	Alifanov	Early Cretaceous		Mongolia	A member of Scincomorpha belonging to the family Hodzhakuliidae. The type species is B. primigenius.	
Carnoscincus	Gen. et sp. nov	Valid	Alifanov	Early Cretaceous		Mongolia	A member of Scincomorpha belonging to the family Hodzhakuliidae. The type species is C. eublepharus.	
Janosikia	Gen. et comb. nov	Valid	Čerňanský, Klembara & Smith	Early Miocene		Germany	A member of Lacertidae; a new genus for "Ophisaurus" ulmensis Gerhardt (1903).	
Jeddaherdan	Gen. et sp. nov	Disputed	Apesteguía et al.	Uncertain		Morocco	An iguanian belonging to the group Acrodonta. The type species is J. aleadonta. Originally described as coming from the Cretaceous Kem Kem Group; Vullo et al. (2022) argued that its fossil material is actually Quaternary in age, and considered it to be a fossil material of a member of the genus Uromastyx.	
Ophisauromimus	Gen. et comb. nov	Valid	Čerňanský, Klembara & Műller	Oligocene		France; Germany	A member of Anguidae. A new genus for "Dopasia" coderetensis Augé (2005); genus also includes "Dopasia" frayssensis Augé (2005).	
Platynotoides	Gen. et sp. nov	Junior homonym	Alifanov	Early Cretaceous		Mongolia	A member of Scincomorpha belonging to the family Hodzhakuliidae. The type species is P. altidentatus. The generic name is preoccupied by Platynotoides Kaszab (1975).	
Pluridens calabaria	Sp. nov	Valid	Longrich	Late Cretaceous (late Campanian)	Nkporo Shale	Nigeria	A mosasaur, a species of Pluridens.	
Solastella	Gen. et sp. nov	Valid	Stocker & Kirk	Eocene	Devil's Graveyard Formation	United States (Texas)	A rhineurid amphisbaenian. The type species is Solastella cookei.	

=== Snakes ===
==== Research ====
- Lee et al. (2016) examine the limb anatomy of Tetrapodophis amplectus, which according to the authors is suggestive of aquatic habits.
- A redescription of the Cenomanian snake Simoliophis rochebrunei on the basis of new fossil material from France is published by Rage, Vullo & Néraudeau (2016).
- Smith & Scanferla (2016) describe a juvenile specimen of Palaeopython fischeri from the Eocene Messel pit with preserved stomach contents, including a specimen of the stem-basilisk species Geiseltaliellus maarius, which in turn preserves an unidentified insect in its stomach.
- McNamara et al. (2016) describe pigment cells responsible for coloration and patterning preserved in a fossil skin of a colubrid snake from the Late Miocene Libros Lagerstätte (Teruel, Spain).
- New fossil material of the viperid Laophis crotaloides is described from Greece by Georgalis et al. (2016).

==== New taxa ====
Name	Novelty	Status	Authors	Age	Unit	Location	Notes	Images
Lunaophis	Gen. et sp. nov	Valid	Albino, Carrillo-Briceño & Neenan	Late Cretaceous (Cenomanian)	La Luna Formation	Venezuela	A snake of uncertain phylogenetic placement. The type species is L. aquaticus.	
Platyspondylophis	Gen. et sp. nov	Valid	Smith et al.	Eocene (Ypresian)	Cambay Shale Formation	India	A member of Madtsoiidae. The type species is P. tadkeshwarensis.	
Rieppelophis	Gen. et comb. nov	Valid	Scanferla, Smith & Schaal	Eocene	Messel pit	Germany	A member of Boidae. A new genus for "Messelophis" ermannorum Schaal & Baszio (2004).	

== Ichthyosauromorphs ==
=== Research ===
- A study of taxonomic richness, disparity and evolutionary rates of ichthyosaurs throughout the Cretaceous period is published by Fischer et al. (2016).
- A restudy of "Platypterygius" campylodon is published by Fischer (2016), who transfers this species to the genus Pervushovisaurus.
- A revision of the ichthyosaur material of the British Middle and Late Jurassic referable to Ophthalmosaurus icenicus is published by Moon & Kirton (2016).

=== New taxa ===
Name	Novelty	Status	Authors	Age	Unit	Location	Notes	Images
Cryopterygius kielanae	Sp. nov	Valid	Tyborowski	Late Jurassic (Tithonian)	Kcynia Formation	Poland	A member of Ophthalmosauridae. Transferred to the genus Undorosaurus by Zverkov & Efimov (2019).	
Ichthyosaurus larkini	Sp. nov	Valid	Lomax & Massare	Early Jurassic (Hettangian)		United Kingdom		
Ichthyosaurus somersetensis	Sp. nov	Valid	Lomax & Massare	Early Jurassic (Hettangian)		United Kingdom		
Sclerocormus	Gen. et sp. nov	Valid	Jiang et al.	Early Triassic (Olenekian)	Nanlinghu Formation	China	A basal member of Ichthyosauriformes. The type species is S. parviceps.	
Wahlisaurus	Gen. et sp. nov	Valid	Lomax	Early Jurassic (Hettangian)		United Kingdom	A member of Leptonectidae. The type species is W. massarae.	

== Sauropterygians ==
=== Research ===
- A study of the histology and microanatomy of the humeri of members of the genus Nothosaurus is published by Klein et al. (2016).
- A reassessment of fossils attributed to the genus Polyptychodon is published by Madzia (2016), who considers the type species of this genus, P. interruptus, to be nomen dubium, and the genus Polyptychodon to be a wastebasket taxon.
- O'Gorman (2016) provides a new diagnosis for Fresnosaurus drescheri and describes additional plesiosaur material from the Late Cretaceous (Maastrichtian) Moreno Formation (California, USA), which he interprets as representing the first aristonectine plesiosaur reported from the Northern Hemisphere.
- A redescription of the holotype specimen of Brancasaurus brancai and a study on the phylogenetic relationships of the species is published by Sachs, Hornung & Kear (2016), who consider the species Gronausaurus wegneri to be a junior synonym of B. brancai.

=== New taxa ===
Name	Novelty	Status	Authors	Age	Unit	Location	Notes	Images
Alexandronectes	Gen. et sp. nov	Valid	Otero et al.	Late Cretaceous (early Maastrichtian)	Conway Formation	New Zealand	An aristonectine elasmosaurid plesiosaur. The type species is Alexandronectes zealandiensis.	
Dawazisaurus	Gen. et sp. nov	Valid	Cheng et al.	Middle Triassic (Anisian)	Guanling Formation	China	A non-pistosauroid eosauropterygian of uncertain phylogenetic placement. The type species is Dawazisaurus brevis.	
Kawanectes	Gen. et comb. nov	Valid	O'Gorman	Late Cretaceous (late Campanian–early Maastrichtian)	Allen Formation; La Colonia Formation	Argentina	An elasmosaurid plesiosaur. The type species is "Trinacromerum" lafquenianum Gasparini & Goñi (1985).	
Lariosaurus sanxiaensis	Sp. nov	Valid	Cheng in Chen et al.	Early Triassic	Jialingjiang Formation	China		
Lariosaurus vosseveldensis	Sp. nov	Valid	Klein et al.	Middle Triassic (Anisian)		Netherlands		
Polycotylus sopozkoi	Sp. nov	Valid	Efimov, Meleshin & Nikiforov	Late Cretaceous		Russia		
Stenorhynchosaurus	Gen. et sp. nov	Valid	Páramo et al..	Early Cretaceous (late Barremian)	Paja Formation	Colombia	A pliosaurid plesiosaur. The type species is Stenorhynchosaurus munozi.	

== Turtles ==
=== Research ===
- A study on the latitudinal gradients in species diversity of Mesozoic non-marine turtles is published by Nicholson et al. (2016).
- A study on the morphological diversity of the skulls of the fossil and recent turtles through time is published by Foth & Joyce (2016).
- A study of the bone shell histology of Condorchelys antiqua and its implications for the lifestyle of the species is published by Cerda, Sterli & Scheyer (2016).
- A study of the bone histology of shell elements of the Late Cretaceous—Paleocene chelid Yaminuechelys is published by Jannello, Cerda & de la Fuente (2016).
- A review of the fossil record, taxonomy and diagnostic features of the fossil species belonging to the genus Chelus is published by Ferreira et al. (2016).
- Fossils of Plesiochelys etalloni and Tropidemys langii, otherwise known from the Kimmeridgian of the Swiss and French Jura Mountains, are described from the British Kimmeridge Clay by Anquetin & Chapman (2016).
- An emended diagnosis of Testudo catalaunica and a study of phylogeny of extinct members of the genus Testudo is published by Luján et al. (2016).
- Giant tortoise fossils collected from the late Miocene-early Pliocene Mehrten Formation (California, USA) are identified as belonging to members of the species Hesperotestudo orthopygia by Biewer et al. (2016).

=== New taxa ===
Name	Novelty	Status	Authors	Age	Unit	Location	Notes	Images
Algorachelus	Gen. et sp. nov	Valid	Pérez-García	Late Cretaceous (Cenomanian)	Arenas de Utrillas Formation	Portugal Spain	A member of Bothremydidae. The type species is A. peregrinus.	
Anhuichelys doumuensis	Sp. nov	Valid	Tong et al.	Middle Paleocene	Doumu Formation	China	A stem-tortoise, a species of Anhuichelys.	
Clemmys hutchensorum	Sp. nov	Valid	Bourque	Early Pleistocene (late Blancan)		United States (Florida)	A species of Clemmys.	
Fontainechelon	Gen. et comb. nov	Valid	Pérez-García, Ortega & Jiménez Fuentes	Early Eocene		France	A tortoise; a new genus for "Achilemys" cassouleti Claude & Tong (2004).	
Inaechelys	Gen. et sp. nov	Disputed	Carvalho, Ghilardi & Barreto	Paleocene (Danian)	Maria Farinha Formation	Brazil	A member of Bothremydidae. The type species is I. pernambucensis. Its status as a valid taxon was challenged by Romano (2016), who considered the genus Inaechelys to be a junior synonym of the genus Rosasia and the species I. pernambucensis/Rosasia pernambucensis to be a nomen dubium.	
Keuperotesta	Gen. et sp. nov	Valid	Szczygielski & Sulej	Late Triassic		Germany	A member of Proterochersidae. The type species is Keuperotesta limendorsa. The genus Keuperotesta was considered to be a junior synonym of the genus Proterochersis by Joyce (2017), though the author maintained K. limendorsa as a distinct species within the latter genus.	
Kinosternon notolophus	Sp. nov	Valid	Bourque	Miocene (Clarendonian)	Alachua Formation; Statenville Formation	United States (Florida)	A mud turtle.	
Kinosternon pannekollops	Sp. nov	Valid	Bourque	Miocene (Clarendonian)	Ogallala Formation	United States (Texas)	A mud turtle.	
Kinosternon rincon	Sp. nov	Valid	Bourque	Miocene (late Barstovian)	Cerro Conejo Formation	United States (New Mexico)	A mud turtle.	
Kinosternon wakeeniense	Sp. nov	Valid	Bourque	Miocene (Clarendonian)	Ash Hollow Formation; Ogallala Formation	United States (Kansas, Nebraska)	A mud turtle.	
Neurankylus notos	Sp. nov	Valid	Lichtig & Lucas	Late Cretaceous (Coniacian-Santonian)	Crevasse Canyon Formation	United States (New Mexico)	A member of Baenidae.	
Neurankylus torrejonensis	Sp. nov	Valid	Lyson et al.	Paleocene (Torrejonian)	Nacimiento Formation	United States (New Mexico)	A member of Baenidae.	
Notoemys tlaxiacoensis	Sp. nov	Valid	López-Conde et al.	Late Jurassic (Kimmeridgian)	Sabinal Formation	Mexico	A member of Platychelyidae.	
Paiutemys	Gen. et sp. nov	Disputed	Joyce, Lyson & Kirkland	Late Cretaceous (late Cenomanian)	Naturita Formation	United States (Utah)	A member of Bothremydidae. The type species is P. tibert. Pérez-García (2018) considered the genus Paiutemys to be a junior synonym of the genus Algorachelus, and transferred the species P. tibert to the latter genus.	
Palaeoamyda	Gen. et comb. nov	Disputed	Cadena	Eocene		Germany	A relative of trionychids; a new genus for "Trionyx" messelianus Reinach (1900). However, Karl (2018) considered Palaeoamyda to be a junior synonym of the genus Rafetoides, and transferred "Trionyx" messelianus to the latter genus.	
Pelorochelon	Gen. et sp. et comb. nov	Valid	Pérez-García, Ortega & Jiménez Fuentes	Middle Eocene		Germany; Spain	A tortoise. The type species is P. soriana; genus also includes Pelorochelon eocaenica (Hummel, 1935).	
Proterochersis porebensis	Sp. nov	Valid	Szczygielski & Sulej	Late Triassic		Poland	A member of Proterochersidae.	
Sichuanchelys palatodentata	Sp. nov	Valid	Joyce et al.	Late Jurassic (Oxfordian)	Shishugou Formation	China	A basal member of Testudinata.	
Tartaruscola	Gen. et sp. nov	Valid	Pérez-García	Eocene (Ypresian)		France	A member of Bothremydidae belonging to the group Foxemydina. The type species is T. teodorii.	
Yelmochelys	Gen. et sp. nov	Valid	Brinkman et al.	Late Cretaceous (late Campanian and early Maastrichtian)	Cañon del Tule Formation; Cerro del Pueblo Formation	Mexico	A stem-kinosternid. The type species is Yelmochelys rosarioae.	

== Other reptiles ==
=== Research ===
- A skull of a juvenile specimen of Delorhynchus cifellii is described from the Richards Spur locality (Oklahoma, United States) by Haridy et al. (2016).
- A revision of the systematics of the Chinese pareiasaurs is published by Benton (2016).
- A study of evolution of body size of the carnivorous and herbivorous members of Captorhinidae is published by Brocklehurst (2016).
- Surmik et al. (2016) describe nothosaurid and tanystropheid bones from the Triassic of Poland preserving blood-vessel-like structures enclosing organic molecules.
- Two new specimens of Atopodentatus unicus are described by Chun et al. (2016), providing new information on the skull anatomy of this species and indicating that its rostrum, rather than being downturned as originally assumed, developed a hammerhead-like shape.
- Description of new material of Hemilopas mentzeli from the Middle Triassic of Silesia (Poland) and a study of the phylogenetic relationships of the species is published by Surmik (2016).
- Description of the anatomy of partially articulated forelimbs and isolated forelimb bones of Drepanosaurus recovered from the Late Triassic (Norian) Hayden Quarry (Chinle Formation) of New Mexico, USA is published by Pritchard et al. (2016).
- A study on the femoral and tibial histology of the rhynchosaur Stenaulorhynchus stockleyi is published by Werning & Nesbitt (2016).
- A study on the maximum body size and distribution of the reptile species known to have gone extinct during the last 50,000 years, as well as the role played by these factors in recent reptile extinction events, is published by Slavenko et al. (2016).

=== New taxa ===
Name	Novelty	Status	Authors	Age	Unit	Location	Notes	Images
Brasinorhynchus	Gen. et sp. nov	Valid	Schultz, Langer & Montefeltro	Middle Triassic (Ladinian)	Santa Maria Formation	Brazil	A rhynchosaur belonging to the group Stenaulorhynchinae. The type species is Brasinorhynchus mariantensis.	
Colobomycter vaughni	Sp. nov	Valid	MacDougall, Modesto & Reisz	Early Permian		United States (Oklahoma)	A member of Lanthanosuchoidea.	
Euconcordia	Nom. nov	Valid	Reisz, Haridy & Müller	Carboniferous (Pennsylvanian)	Calhouns Shale	United States (Kansas)	A member of Captorhinidae; a replacement name for Concordia Müller & Reisz (2005).	
Langeronyx	Gen. et comb. nov	Valid	Ezcurra, Montefeltro & Butler	Middle Triassic (Anisian)	Bromsgrove Sandstone Formation	United Kingdom	A rhynchosaur; a new genus for "Rhynchosaurus" brodiei Benton (1990).	
Ozimek	Gen. et sp. nov	Valid	Dzik & Sulej	Late Triassic (probably late Carnian)		Poland	A relative of Sharovipteryx. The type species is O. volans.	
Teyujagua	Gen. et sp. nov	Valid	Pinheiro et al.	Early Triassic (Induan to early Olenekian)	Sanga do Cabral Formation	Brazil	A member of Archosauromorpha closely related to Archosauriformes. The type species is Teyujagua paradoxa.	
Xinpusaurus xingyiensis	Sp. nov	Valid	Li et al.	Middle Triassic (Ladinian)		China	A thalattosaur.	
