= Kinkonychelys =

Kinkonychelys Temporal range: Late Cretaceous 70.6–66 Ma

Scientific classification
- Kingdom: Animalia
- Phylum: Chordata
- Class: Reptilia
- Order: Testudines
- Suborder: Pleurodira
- Family: †Bothremydidae
- Tribe: †Kurmademydini
- Genus: †Kinkonychelys; Gaffney et al., 2009

Species
- Kinkonychelys rogersi

Extinct genus of turtles

Kinkonychelys ("Lac Kinkony Study Area turtle") is an extinct genus of side-necked turtle which existed in Madagascar during the Late Cretaceous Epoch. It contains the single species Kinkonychelys rogersi, named in honor of its discoverer, Raymond R. Rogers. The genus and species are based on UA 9748, a nearly complete skull, which represents the first turtle skull described from the pre-Holocene era in Madagascar. A number of isolated skull and jaw bones have also been assigned to K. rogersi. These specimens were found in rocks of the Maastrichtian-age Maevarano Formation in the Mahajanga Basin of northwestern Madagascar. Another specimen, FMNH PR 2446, is speculated to represent another species, currently known as Kinkonychelys sp., but consensus on its distinction from K. rogersi remains unclear.

The Maevarano Formation is a nonmarine rock formation that was deposited under a seasonal, semi-arid climate. A diverse vertebrate assemblage is known from the formation, including fishes, frogs, other turtles, lizards, snakes, crocodyliforms, dinosaurs, birds, and mammals. The rocks of the formation can be subdivided into several members. UA 9748 was found in a claystone bed from an unnamed upper member; this member has also produced abundant and well-preserved fossils of ray-finned fish, crocodyliforms, and dinosaurs. The other specimens assigned to Kinkonychelys were found in the older Anembalemba Formation.

Kinkonychelys is classified as a member of the Kurmademydini group in the family Bothremydidae, together with the Late Cretaceous turtles Sankuchemys and Kurmademys, from India. The classification of Kinkonychelys into this group has helped to support the theory that the island of Madagascar and the subcontinent India were connected to each other prior to the end of the late Cretaceous period.
