= Itapecuruemys =

Itapecuruemys Temporal range: Aptian ~125–113 Ma

Scientific classification
- Kingdom: Animalia
- Phylum: Chordata
- Class: Reptilia
- Order: Testudines
- Suborder: Pleurodira
- Family: †Bothremydidae
- Subfamily: †Bothremydinae
- Tribe: †Cearachelyini
- Genus: †Itapecuruemys; Batista, Carvalho & la Fuente, 2020
- Species: †I. amazoniensis

Binomial name
- †Itapecuruemys amazoniensis Batista, Carvalho & la Fuente, 2020

Extinct genus of turtles

Itapecuruemys ("Itapecuru turtle") is an extinct genus of bothremydid pleurodiran turtle that was discovered in the Itapecuru Formation of Brazil. It is a monotypic genus, with only type species Itapecuruemys amazoniensis known.

== Etymology ==
The genus was named for the Itapecuru Formation of Brazil, the locality from which the remains of Itapecuruemys were recovered. The specific epithet is named after the Legal Amazon region, where it was found.

== Description ==
The carapace of Itapecuruemys amazoniensis is broad and low. The lateral margins converge posteriorly, with the widest point level with the fourth rib. Most of the carapace is unknown, consisting of one nuchal and several suprapygal plates, as well as seven neural plates and sixteen ribs. The first neural vertebra is similar to that of Kurmademys. The second to fifth neurals more closely resemble Foxemys. The nuchal plate is preserved only by a fragment of the anterior-most portion. Scute preservation for Itapecuruemys is poor, with only the second and third vertebral scutes and second, third and fourth pleurals being recognizable.
