= Chedighaii =

Chedighaii Temporal range: Late Cretaceous (Campanian), 83.6–74.0 Ma

Scientific classification
- Kingdom: Animalia
- Phylum: Chordata
- Class: Reptilia
- Order: Testudines
- Suborder: Pleurodira
- Family: †Bothremydidae
- Subfamily: †Bothremydinae
- Tribe: †Bothremydini
- Subtribe: †Bothremydina; Gaffney et al., 2006
- Genus: †Chedighaii; Gaffney et al., 2006

Type species
- Chedighaii hutchisoni Gaffney et al., 2006

Other species
- Chedighaii barberi (Schmidt, 1940)

Synonyms
- "Naiadochelys" ingravata Hay, 1908; Podocnemis barberi Schmidt, 1940; Podocnemis alabamae Zangerl, 1948; Bothremys barberi Gaffney and Zangerl, 1968

Genus of turtles

Chedighaii is an extinct genus of marine bothremydid side-necked turtle that inhabited eastern and south-central North America during the Campanian stage of the Late Cretaceous. It is known from two species C. hutchisoni and C. barberi. The genus name is derived from ch’ééh digháhii, the Navajo word for turtle.

The type species, C. hutchisoni was named in 2006 by Gaffney et al. for a specimen, KUVP 14765, consisting only of a skull. The specimen was found in the San Juan Basin of New Mexico, USA in the Hunter Wash Member of the Kirtland Formation. The formation is one of many formations that are from the Kirtlandian land-vertebrate age, and dates to 74.0 million years ago. The holotype skull is nearly complete. No skeleton or carapace is known, but the material of "Naiadochelys" ingravata might be assignable to C. hutchisoni. Other remains of C. hutchinsoni are known from the Cerro del Pueblo Formation of Coahuila, Mexico and the Tar Heel Formation of North Carolina.

The other species, C. barberi, was initially classified in Podocnemis and then Bothremys, and had a more easterly distribution along the coastal margins of Appalachia. Remains are known from the Brownstone Marl of Arkansas, the Blufftown Formation of Alabama and western Georgia, the Tar Heel Formation of North Carolina, and the Marshalltown Formation of New Jersey.
