= Zolhafah =

Zolhafah Temporal range: Maastrichtian

Scientific classification
- Kingdom: Animalia
- Phylum: Chordata
- Class: Reptilia
- Order: Testudines
- Suborder: Pleurodira
- Family: †Bothremydidae
- Subfamily: †Bothremydinae
- Tribe: †Bothremydini
- Subtribe: †Bothremydina
- Genus: †Zolhafah; De Broin & Werner, 1998
- Species: †Z. bella

Binomial name
- †Zolhafah bella De Broin & Werner, 1998

Genus of reptiles

Zolhafah is an extinct genus of bothremydid pleurodiran turtle that was discovered in the Western Desert of Egypt. The genus consists solely of type species Z. bella.

== Discovery ==
Zolhafah was discovered in the Ammonite Hill Member of the Dakhla Formation, Egypt, which dates back to the Maastrichtian stage of the Late Cretaceous period. The genus and its type, and only known, species, Z. bella, was described in 1998 by French paleontologists France de Lapparent de Broin and Christa Werner on the basis of a nearly complete skull. The generic name Zolhafah comes from the Arabic salifhafa "turtle", while the specific name is from the Latin bella "beautiful".

== Description ==
The preserved skull of Zolhafah is 7.2 centimetres in length. Its describers note that it differs from Bothremys and Rosasia by its slightly more rounded snout, with the posterior section of the skull being shortened. Similar to Bothremys, its choanae are at the same level as the triturating surface of the palate. It also differs from Bothremys and Rosasia by many small details, such as a frontal longer than its prefrontal, elongated orbits smaller than those of Rosasia and larger than those of Bothremys', and a higher anterior premaxillary surface. The occipital condyle is slightly posterior to the quadrate's articular process, similar to Rosasia and Bothremys. The skull is the only element from the Ammonite Hills locality that can be positively assigned to Zolhafah.
