= Araiochelys =

Araiochelys Temporal range: Paleocene, 66.043–61.7 Ma

Scientific classification
- Kingdom: Animalia
- Phylum: Chordata
- Class: Reptilia
- Order: Testudines
- Suborder: Pleurodira
- Family: †Bothremydidae
- Subfamily: †Bothremydinae
- Tribe: †Bothremydini
- Subtribe: †Bothremydina
- Genus: †Araiochelys; Gaffney et al., 2006
- Species: †A. hirayamai

Binomial name
- †Araiochelys hirayamai Gaffney et al., 2006

Extinct genus of turtles

Araiochelys ("narrow turtle") is an extinct genus of bothremydid pleurodiran turtle that was discovered in the Ouled Abdoun Basin, Morocco. The genus consists solely of type species A. hirayamai.

== Discovery ==
Araiochelys was discovered in the Ouled Abdoun Basin of Morocco, primarily known for its Maastrichtian and Paleocene fossils.

== Description ==
The preorbital section of Araiochelys's skull is narrower than in all other members of the Bothremydini. The dorsal process is noted by the describers as being narrow in contrast to Bothremys. The ridge forming the lower rim of the orbit is relatively distinct, also in contrast to Bothremys.
