= Gokakelys =

Gokakelys Temporal range: Late Cretaceous to Early Paleocene(Maastrichtian–Danian), 66.5–65 Ma

Scientific classification
- Kingdom: Animalia
- Phylum: Chordata
- Class: Reptilia
- Order: Testudines
- Suborder: Pleurodira
- Family: †Bothremydidae
- Subfamily: †Kurmademydinae
- Tribe: †Kurmademydini
- Genus: †Gokakelys; Wilson et al., 2026
- Species: †G. eos

Binomial name
- †Gokakelys eos Wilson et al., 2026

Extinct genus of turtle

Gokakelys (lit. 'Gokak Turtle') is an extinct genus of kurmademydin bothremydid side-necked turtle that lived during Late Cretaceous, or Paleogene, of Intertrappean Beds, India, the fossils were excavated from Arkosic Sandstone with Carbonate nodules sediments of Upparhatti locality in Karnataka. The type species is Gokakelys eos, which is known from a nearly undistorted skull and referred shells fossils. Just like Deccansaurus, Gokakelys fossils are known from K-Pg sediments of Intertrappean Beds.
