= Sindhochelys =

Sindhochelys Temporal range: Early Paleocene–Early Eocene

Scientific classification
- Kingdom: Animalia
- Phylum: Chordata
- Class: Reptilia
- Order: Testudines
- Suborder: Pleurodira
- Family: †Bothremydidae
- Genus: †Sindhochelys; Lapparent de broin et al., 2021

Type species
- †Sindhochelys ragei Lapparent de Broin et al., 2021

Extinct genus of turtle

Sindhochelys is a genus of extinct turtle of the family Bothremydidae. It lived during the early Paleocene in what is known Sindh, Pakistan. The genus was discovered in the Khadro Formation and named in December 2021. The genus represents the first known member of its family in Pakistan. The family Bothremydidae lived from the Cenomanian of the early Cretaceous to the Miocene epoch.

== Discovery ==
The turtle was discovered in the Paleogene aged Khadro Formation, which is located near the Ranikot Fort area of Pakistan. The formation also contains the remains of the giant snake Gigantophis, which was discovered in 1901 by Charles William Andrews.
