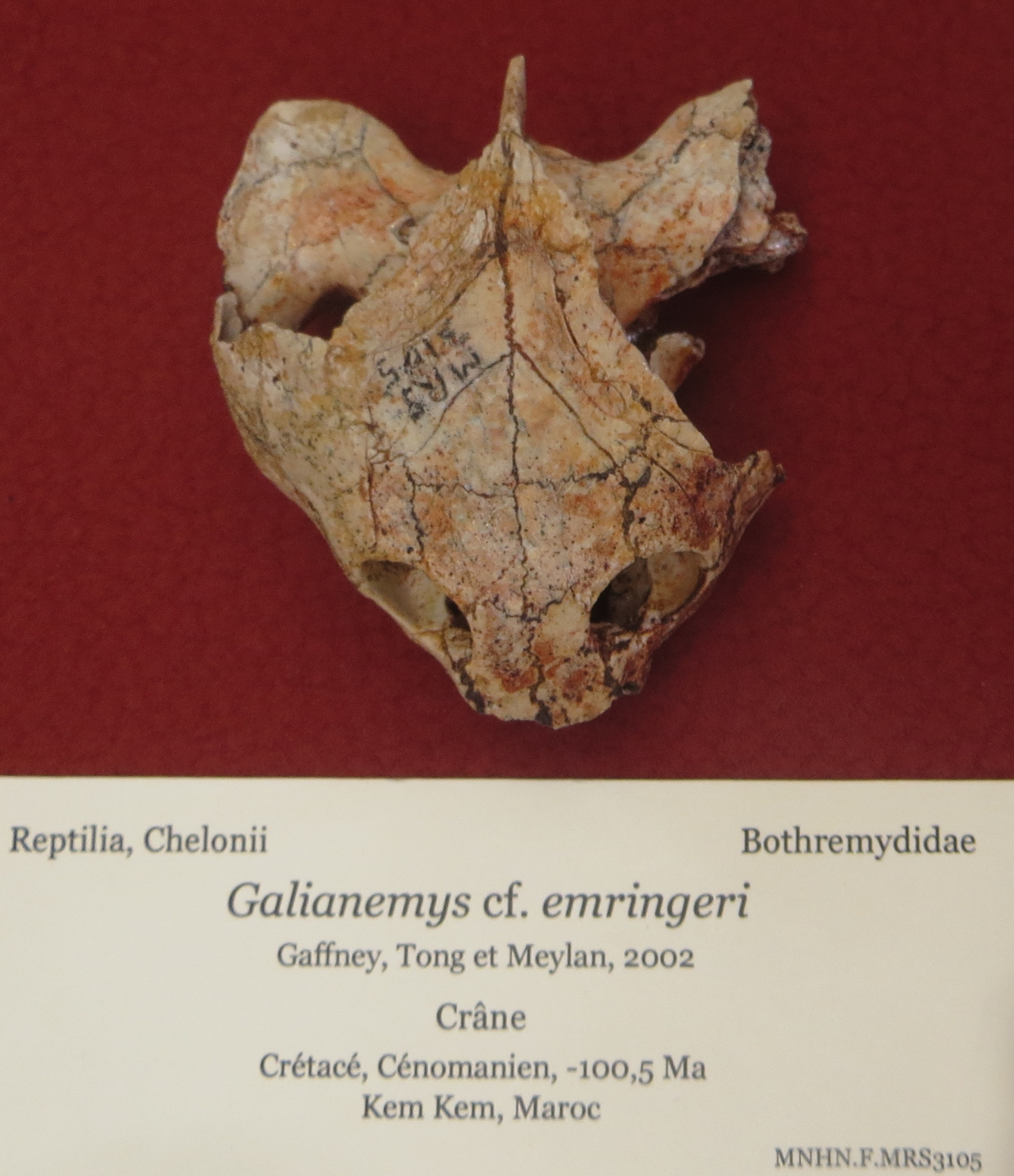
- Galianemys Skull
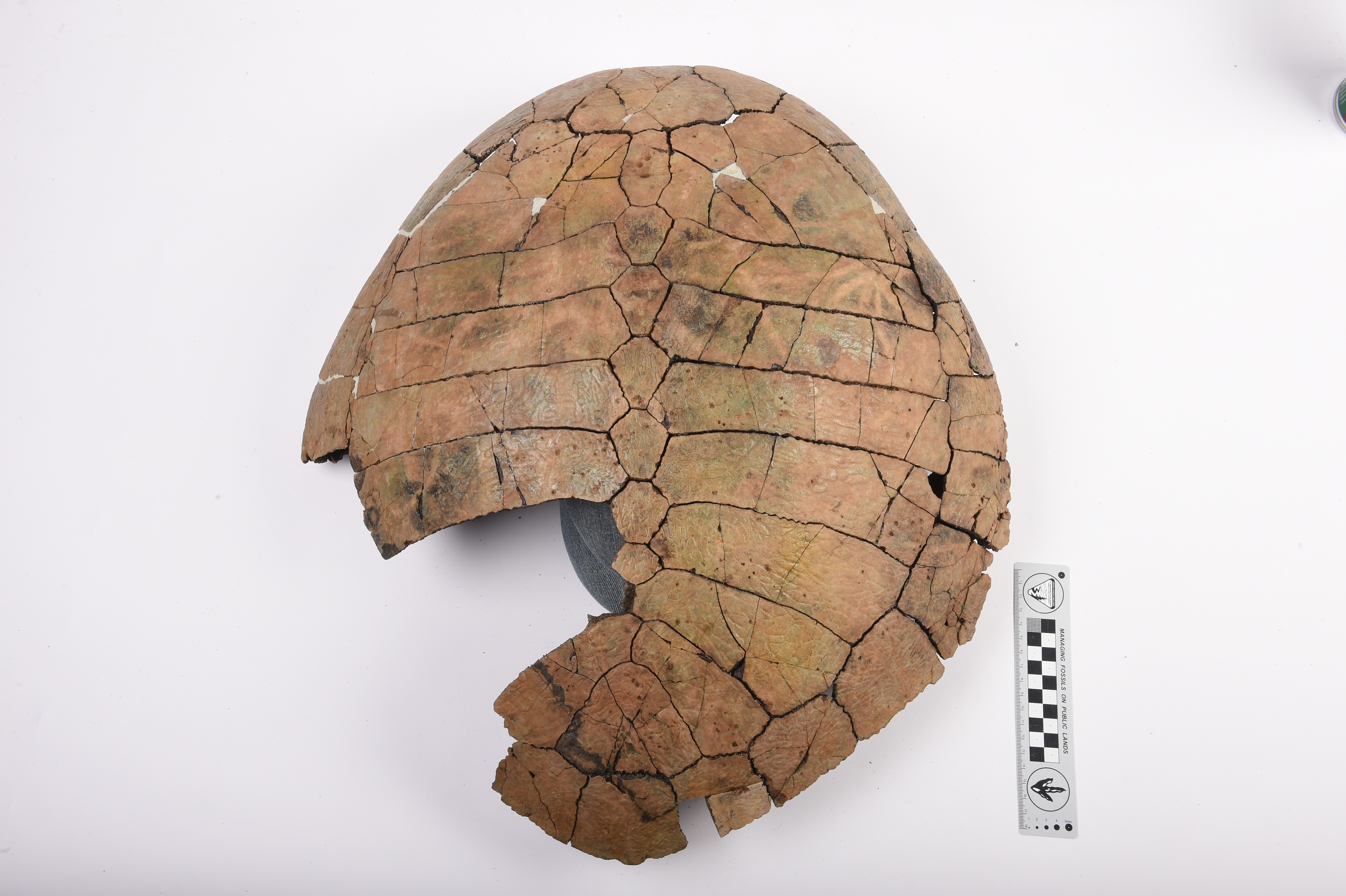
- Shell of Taphrosphys

Scientific classification
- Kingdom: Animalia
- Phylum: Chordata
- Class: Reptilia
- Order: Testudines
- Suborder: Pleurodira
- Hyperfamily: Pelomedusoides
- Family: †Bothremydidae; Baur, 1891

Subfamilies
- See text

= Bothremydidae =

Bothremydidae Temporal range: Aptian–Miocene

Extinct family of turtles

Bothremydidae is an extinct family of side-necked turtles (Pleurodira) known from the Cretaceous and Cenozoic. They are closely related to Podocnemididae, and are amongst the most widely distributed pleurodire groups, with their fossils having been found in Africa, India, the Middle East, Europe, North America and South America. Bothremydids were aquatic turtles with a high morphological diversity, indicative of generalist, molluscivorous, piscivorous and possibly herbivorous grazing diets, with some probably capable of suction feeding. Unlike modern pleurodires, which are exclusively freshwater, bothremydids inhabited freshwater, marine and coastal environments. Their marine habits allowed bothremydids to disperse across oceanic barriers into Europe and North America during the early Late Cretaceous (Cenomanian). The youngest records of the group are indeterminate remains from Saudi Arabia and Oman, dating to the Miocene.

== Taxonomy ==
The family is split into two subfamilies and a number of tribes.

Bothremydidae

- Pleurochayah appalachius Adrian et al., 2021 Woodbine Formation, Texas, Late Cretaceous (Cenomanian)
- "Chrysemys" montolivensis Roman 1897 Montoulieu, France, Oligocene (Rupelian)
- Sindhochelys ragei Lapparent de broin et al., 2021 Khadro Formation, Pakistan, Paleocene (Danian)
- Apertotemporalis Stromer, 1934 Bahariya Formation, Egypt, Late Cretaceous (Cenomanian)
- Subfamily Bothremydinae Gaffney et al., 2006
  - Abalakemys Pérez-García, 2023 Farin-Doutchi Formation, Niger, Late Cretaceous (Maastrichtian)
  - Tribe Bothremydini Gaffney et al., 2006
  - Palauchelys López-Conde et al. 2021 Olmos Formation, Mexico, Late Cretaceous (Campanian)
  - Khargachelys AbdelGawad et al. 2021 Quseir Formation, Egypt, Late Cretaceous (Campanian)
    - Subtribe Bothremydina Gaffney et al., 2006
      - Akoranemys Pérez-García, 2021. Madagascar, Late Cretaceous (Cenomanian)
      - Algorachelus Pérez-García 2017
        - Algorachelus parvus (Haas 1978) Bet-Meir Formation, Amminadav Formation, Palestine, Late Cretaceous (Cenomanian)
        - Algorachelus peregrinus Pérez-García 2017 Utrillas Formation, Spain, Nazaré, Portugal, Late Cretaceous (Cenomanian)
        - Algorachelus tibert (Joyce et al. 2016) Naturita Formation, Utah, Late Cretaceous (Cenomanian) (alternatively considered the only member of the genus Paiutemys)
      - Araiochelys Gaffney et al., 2006 Ouled Abdoun Basin, Morocco, Paleocene
        - Araiochelys hirayamai Gaffney et al., 2006
      - Bothremys Leidy, 1865 (jr synonym: Karkaemys)
        - Bothremys arabicus (Zalmout et al., 2005) Wadi Umm Ghudran Formation, Jordan, Late Cretaceous (Santonian)
        - Bothremys cooki Leidy, 1865 Merchantville Formation, Navesink Formation, New Jersey, Tar Heel Formation, North Carolina, Late Cretaceous (Campanian-Maastrichtian)
        - Bothremys kellyi Gaffney et al., 2006 Ouled Abdoun Basin, Morocco, Paleocene
        - Bothremys maghrebiana Gaffney et al., 2006 Ouled Abdoun Basin, Morocco, Paleocene
      - Chedighaii Gaffney et al., 2006
        - Chedighaii barberi (Schmidt, 1940) Brownstone Marl, Arkansas, Blufftown Formation, Georgia, Marshalltown Formation, New Jersey, Tar Heel Formation, North Carolina, Late Cretaceous (Campanian)
        - Chedighaii hutchisoni Gaffney et al., 2006 Cerro del Pueblo Formation, Mexico, Late Cretaceous (Campanian) Kirtland Formation, New Mexico, Tar Heel Formation, North Carolina, Late Cretaceous (Campanian)
      - Rosasia Costa, 1940 Argilas de Aveiro Formation, Portugal, Late Cretaceous (Campanian-Maastrichtian)
        - Rosasia soutoi Carrington da Costa, 1940
      - Inaechelys Carvalho, 2016 Maria Farinha Formation, Brasil, Paleocene
        - Inaechelys pernambucensis Carvalho, 2016
      - Zolhafah Lapparent de Broin and Werner, 1998 Dakhla Formation, Egypt, Late Cretaceous (Maastrichtian)
        - Zolhafah bella Lapparent de Broin and Werner, 1998
    - Subtribe Foxemydina Gaffney et al., 2006
      - Elochelys Nopsca, 1931 France, Spain, Late Cretaceous (Campanian-Maastrichtian)
        - Elochelys perfecta Nopsca, 1931
      - Foxemys Tong et al., 1998 Csehbánya Formation, Hungary, Late Cretaceous (Santonian) Argiles et Grès à Reptiles Formation, Marnes d'Auzas Formation, Marnes Rouges Inferieures Formation, Lestaillats Marls Formation, France, Late Cretaceous (Campanian-Maastrichtian), Villalba de la Sierra Formation, Spain, Late Cretaceous (Campanian)
        - Foxemys mechinorum Tong et al., 1998
      - Palemys Gray, 1870
        - Palemys bowerbankii (Owen, 1842) London Clay Formation, England, Eocene (Ypresian)
      - Polysternon Portis, 1882 Argiles et Grès à Reptiles Formation, Rognacian Formation, France, Vitoria Formation, Laño, Tremp Formation, Sierra Perenchiza Formation, Spain, Late Cretaceous (Campanian-Maastrichtian)
        - Polysternon provinciale (Matheron, 1869)
      - Puentemys Cadena et al., 2012 Cerrejón Formation, Colombia, Paleocene
        - Puentemys mushaisaensis Cadena et al., 2012
      - Tartaruscola Pérez-García, 2016 Saint-Papoul, France, Eocene (Ypresian)
      - Iberoccitanemys Pérez-García et al. 2012 Vegas de Matute Formation, Villalba de la Sierra Formation, Spain, Campanian Marnes d'Auzas Formation, France, Maastrichtian
        - Iberoccitanemys atlanticum (Lapparent de Broin and Murelaga, 1996 originally Polysternon atlanticum) syn Iberoccitanemys convenarum (Laurent et al., 2002)
    - Tribe Taphrosphyini Gaffney et al., 2006
        - Ilatardia Pérez-García, 2019 Farin Doutchi Formation, Niger, Late Cretaceous (Maastrichtian)
      - Subtribe Nigermydina Gaffney et al., 2006
        - Arenila Lapparent de Broin and Werner, 1998 Dakhla Formation, Egypt, Late Cretaceous (Maastrichtian)
          - Arenila krebsi Lapparent de Broin and Werner, 1998
      - Subtribe Taphrosphyina Gaffney et al., 2006
        - Azabbaremys Gaffney et al., 2001 Teberemt Formation, Mali, Paleocene
          - Azabbaremys moragjonesi Gaffney et al., 2001
        - Eotaphrosphys Perez-Garcia, 2018 Mont-Aimé, France, Late Cretaceous (Maastrichtian)
          - Eotaphrosphys ambiguum (Gaudry, 1890)
        - Labrostochelys Gaffney et al., 2006 Ouled Abdoun Basin, Morocco, Paleocene
          - Labrostochelys galkini Gaffney et al., 2006
        - Motelomama Perez-Garcia, 2018 Salina Group, Peru, Eocene (Ypresian)
          - Motelomama olssoni (Schmidt, 1931)
        - Phosphatochelys Gaffney and Tong, 2003 Ouled Abdoun Basin, Morocco, Paleocene
          - Phosphatochelys tedfordi Gaffney and Tong, 2003
        - Rhothonemys Gaffney et al., 2006 Ouled Abdoun Basin, Morocco, Paleocene
          - Rhothonemys brinkmani Gaffney et al., 2006
        - Taphrosphys Cope, 1869 (jr synonyms: Amblypeza, Bantuchelys, Prochonias)
          - Taphrosphys congolensis (Dollo, 1912) Landana Formation, Angola, Paleocene
          - Taphrosphys dares Hay, 1908 (nomen dubium)
          - Taphrosphys ippolitoi Gaffney et al., 2006 Ouled Abdoun Basin, Morocco, Paleocene
          - Taphrosphys sulcatus (Leidy, 1856) Hornerstown Formation, New Egypt Formation, New Jersey, Late Cretaceous (Maastrichtian)
        - Ummulisani Gaffney et al., 2006 Morocco, Eocene (Ypresian)
          - Ummulisani rutgersensis Gaffney et al., 2006
        - Crassachelys Bergounioux, 1952 (nomen dubium)
          - Crassachelys neurirregularis Bergounioux, 1952
        - Eusarkia Bergounioux, 1952 (nomen dubium)
          - Eusarkia rotundiformis Bergounioux, 1952
        - Gafsachelys Stefano, 1903 (nomen dubium)
          - Gafsachelys phosphatica Stefano, 1903
          - Gafsachelys moularensis Bergounioux, 1955
  - Tribe Cearachelyini Gaffney et al., 2006
    - Cearachelys Gaffney et al., Santana Formation, Brazil, Early Cretaceous (Albian)
      - Cearachelys placidoi Gaffney et al., 2001
    - Elkanemys Maniel, de la Fuente and Canale, 2021 Candeleros Formation, Argentina, Late Cretaceous (Cenomanian)
      - Elkanemys pritchardi Maniel, de la Fuente and Canale, 2021
    - Itapecuruemys Batista et al., 2020 Itapecuru Formation, Brasil, Early Cretaceous (Aptian)
      - Itapecuruemys amazoniensis Batista et al., 2020
    - Galianemys Gaffney et al., 2002 Kem Kem Group, Morocco, Late Cretaceous (Cenomanian)
      - Galianemys emringeri Gaffney et al., 2002
      - Galianemys whitei Gaffney et al., 2002
- Subfamily Kurmademydinae Gaffney et al., 2006
  - Tribe Kurmademydini Gaffney et al., 2006
    - Gokakelys Wilson Mantilla et al., 2026 Intertrappean Beds, India, Late Cretaceous (Maastrichtian)
      - Gokakelys eos Wilson Mantilla et al., 2026
    - Jainemys Joyce & Bandyopadhyay, 2020 Lameta Formation, India, Late Cretaceous (Maastrichtian)
      - Jainemys pisdurensis Joyce & Bandyopadhyay, 2020
    - Kinkonychelys Gaffney et al., 2009 Maevarano Formation, Madagascar, Late Cretaceous (Maastrichtian)
      - Kinkonychelys rogersi Gaffney et al., 2009
    - Kurmademys Gaffney et al., 2001 Kallamedu Formation, India, Late Cretaceous (Maastrichtian)
      - Kurmademys kallamedensis Gaffney et al., 2001
    - Sankuchemys Gaffney et al., 2003 Intertrappean Beds, India, Late Cretaceous (Maastrichtian)
      - Sankuchemys sethnai Gaffney et al., 2003

== Phylogeny ==
Below is a cladogram by Gaffney et al. in 2006:

- Chelidae
- - Pelomedusoides
  - - - Araripemys
      - Pelomedusidae
    - - Euraxemydidae
        - Dirqadium
        - Euraxemys
      - Podocnemidioidea
        - Podocnemidinura
        - Bothremydidae
          - Kurmademydini
            - Kurmademys
            - Sankuchemys
          - Bothremydinae
            - Cearachelyini
              - Galianemys
              - Cearachelys
            - Bothremyodda
              - Bothremydini
                - - Foxemys (=Polysternon)
                  - Polysternon
                - - Zolhafah
                  - - Rosasia
                    - - Araiochelys
                      - - - Chedighaii hutchisoni
                          - Chedighaii barberi
                        - - - Bothremys cooki
                            - Bothremys magrhebiana
                          - - Bothremys kellyi
                            - Bothremys arabicus
              - Taphrosphyini
                - - Nigeremys
                  - Arenila
                - - Azabbaremys
                  - - Labrostochelys
                    - - Taphrosphys
                      - - Rhothonemys
                        - - Phosphatochelys
                          - Ummulisani
