= Dakhla Formation =

Geological formation in Egypt

- Stratigraphic range: Maastrichtian-Danian; ~71–63 Ma
- Type: Geological formation
- Sub-units: Ammonite Hill Member; Baris Oyster Mudstone Member; Beida Shale Member; Kharga Shale Member
- Underlies: Tarawan Formation
- Overlies: Duwi Formation
- Thickness: 230 meters

Lithology
- Primary: Shale
- Other: Marl, Phosphorite

Location
- Country: Egypt

The Dakhla Formation, also called the Dakhla Shale, is a Maastrichtian-Danian geologic formation in the Western Desert, Egypt. Dinosaur remains are among the fossils that have been recovered from the formation, although none have yet been referred to a specific genus.

One of the younger Danian-aged localities of the formation, the Qreiya 3 site, is a lagerstätte preserving the earliest known records of numerous modern fish groups.

== Fossil content ==
Color key
Taxon	Reclassified taxon	Taxon falsely reported as present	Dubious taxon or junior synonym	Ichnotaxon	Ootaxon	Morphotaxon

Notes
Uncertain or tentative taxa are in small text; ~~crossed out~~ taxa are discredited.

=== Reptiles ===
==== Dinosaurs ====
Dinosaurs reported from the Dakhla Formation
Genus	Species	Presence	Material	Notes	Images
Sauropoda		Ammonite Hill Member	A left femur (Vb-646).	Comparable to femurs of Brachiosaurus and Saltasaurus	

==== Turtles ====
Turtles reported from the Dakhla Formation
Genus	Species	Presence	Material	Notes	Images
Arenila	A. krebsi	Ammonite Hill Member	Partial skull	A bothremydid turtle	
Arenila	?Cf. A. krebsi	Ammonite Hill Member	Partial dorsal shell and right pelvis	A bothremydid turtle	
Bothremydidae	Undetermined large forms	Ammonite Hill Member	Nuchal bone, left pleuron, and partial plastron of one individual	A large bothremydid turtle, with a shell length of 70–80 cm (28–31 in)	
Gigantochelys	G. aegyptiacus	Beris Member	Pelvic girdle	A large dermochelyid turtle	
Panchelonioidea	Gen. et. sp. indet.	Ammonite Hill Member	Humerus (NVP010)	A giant marine turtle	
Taphrosphys	T. cf. sulcatus	Ammonite Hill Member	Anterior part of dorsal shell and partial dorsal shell with partial anterior plastral lobe	A bothremydid turtle	
Taphrosphys	cf. T. sp.	Ammonite Hill Member	Left first pleural	A bothremydid turtle	
?aff. Tasbacka	?aff. T. sp.	Ammonite Hill Member	Left humerus	A chelonioid sea turtle	
Zolhafah	Z. bella	Ammonite Hill Member	Skull	A bothremydid turtle	

==== Squamates ====
Squamates reported from the Dakhla Formation
Genus	Species	Presence	Material	Notes	Images
Globidens	G. phosphaticus	Beris Oyster Mudstone Member	A single tooth crown (CUNV0011)	A mosasaurine.	
Halisaurus	H. auriculatus	Beris Oyster Mudstone Member		A halisaurine	
Halisaurus	H. hebae	Beris Oyster Mudstone Member		A halisaurine	
Mosasaurinae	Indeterminate	Beris Oyster Mudstone Member	A fragmentary small dentary with a single tooth (CUNV0012)	A mosasaurine	
Palaeophiidae	Indeterminate	Qreiya 3		A marine snake.	
Prognathodon	P. sp.	Lower part	Two tooth crowns, three cervical, nine dorsal, three caudal vertebrae, and ribs, found in association (NVP025)	Most similar to P. overtoni, possibly a member of that species	

=== Cartilaginous fish ===
Fish reported from the Dakhla Formation
Genus	Species	Presence	Material	Notes	Images
Hexanchidae		Qreiya 3	Teeth	A cow shark.	
Odontaspididae		Qreiya 3	Teeth	A sand shark.	
Sclerorhynchus	S. cf. leptodon	Beris Member	Four fragmentary rostral denticles originally attributed to Onchopristis sp.	A sawskate	
Sclerorhynchoidei	Indeterminate	Beris Member	An exceptionally large, 1.46 metres (4.8 ft) long rostrum originally attributed to Onchopristis sp.	A sawskate	

=== Ray-finned fish ===
Fish reported from the Dakhla Formation
Genus	Species	Presence	Material	Notes	Images
Anomoeodus	A. aegypticus	Lower Beris Member	A single specimen (NVP023)	A pycnodont.	
Anomoeodus	A. teneidaensis	Lower Beris Member	A single specimen (NVP024)	A pycnodont.	
Aulostomoidea	Indeterminate	Qreiya 3	Articulated skeleton	A trumpetfish and cornetfish relative.	
Carangidae	Indeterminate	Qreiya 3	Articulated skeleton	A relative of jacks.	
Clupeoidei	Indeterminate	Qreiya 3	Articulated skeleton	A herring relative.	
Diastemapycnodus	D. tavernensis	Beris Member	A single vomer with partial dentition	A pycnodont	
Mene	sp.	Qreiya 3	Articulated skeleton	A moonfish.	
cf. Nursallia	Indeterminate	Qreiya 3	Articulated skeleton	A pycnodont.	
Osteoglossidae	Indeterminate	Qreiya 3	Articulated skeleton	A bonytongue.	
Scombrinae (Eocoelopomini)	Indeterminate	Qreiya 3	Articulated skeleton	A scombrid.	
Syngnathidae	Indeterminate	Qreiya 3	Articulated skeleton	A pipefish.	
Veliferidae	Indeterminate	Qreiya 3	Articulated skeleton	A sailfin velifer.	
Trichiuroidea	Indeterminate	Qreiya 3	Articulated skeleton	A relative of cutlassfish and snake mackerels.	
Wadiichthys	W. anbaawyi	Beris Member		A saurodontid ichthyodectiform	
Zeiformes	Indeterminate	Qreiya 3	Articulated skeleton	A zeiform.	

=== Invertebrates ===
==== Bivalves ====
Bivalves reported from the Dakhla Formation
Genus	Species	Presence	Material	Notes	Images
Apectoichnus	A. longissimus	Ammonite Hill Member	Borings in Nypa fruits	Bivalve borings	
Teredolites	T. clavatus	Ammonite Hill Member	32 moderately preserved borings (TBT02-33) and two badly preserved specimens (TBT44-45) in Nypa fruits	Bivalve borings	

=== Plants ===
Plants reported from the Dakhla Formation
Genus	Species	Presence	Material	Notes	Images
Nypa	N. burtinii		Fruits and seed casts	A mangrove palm	
Nypa	N. sp.	Ammonite Hill Member	Fruits with bivalve borings	A mangrove palm	

== See also ==
- List of dinosaur-bearing rock formations
  - List of stratigraphic units with indeterminate dinosaur fossils
