= Ilatardia =

Ilatardia Temporal range: Maastrichtian

Scientific classification
- Domain: Eukaryota
- Kingdom: Animalia
- Phylum: Chordata
- Class: Reptilia
- Order: Testudines
- Suborder: Pleurodira
- Family: †Bothremydidae
- Clade: †Bothremydodda
- Tribe: †Taphrosphyini
- Genus: †Ilatardia; Pérez-García, 2019
- Species: †I. cetiotesta

Binomial name
- †Ilatardia cetiotesta Pérez-García, 2019

Genus of reptiles

Ilatardia is an extinct genus of bothremydid pleurodiran turtle that was discovered in the Farin Doutchi Formation of Niger. The genus consists solely of type species I. cetiotesta.

== Discovery ==
The holotype of Ilatardia was discovered in the Farin-Doutchi Formation of Niger. It consists entirely of a large, relatively complete skull, around 20 cm in length.
