= Rhothonemys =

Rhothonemys Temporal range: Paleogene

Scientific classification
- Kingdom: Animalia
- Phylum: Chordata
- Class: Reptilia
- Order: Testudines
- Suborder: Pleurodira
- Family: †Bothremydidae
- Tribe: †Taphrosphyini
- Subtribe: †Taphrosphyina
- Genus: †Rhothonemys; Gaffney, Tong & Meylan, 2006
- Species: †R. brinkmani

Binomial name
- †Rhothonemys brinkmani Gaffney, Tong & Meylan, 2006

Genus of reptiles

Rhothonemys is an extinct genus of bothremydid pleurodiran turtle that was discovered in the Paleogene of Morocco. The genus consists solely of the type species R. brinkmani.

Rhothonemys was discovered in the Ouled Abdoun Basin of Morocco, in deposits dated to the Paleogene. It is known from a partial skull, lacking the palate and basicranium, and a lower jaw, stored in the American Museum of Natural History. The genus name is derived from the Greek word ῥώθων (rhothon) "nose" and alludes to the huge nasal opening. The species name R. brinkmani honors the paleontologist Donald Brinkman.
