= Motelomama =

Motelomama Temporal range: Ypresian ~55–49 Ma

Scientific classification
- Domain: Eukaryota
- Kingdom: Animalia
- Phylum: Chordata
- Class: Reptilia
- Order: Testudines
- Suborder: Pleurodira
- Family: †Bothremydidae
- Tribe: †Taphrosphyini
- Subtribe: †Taphrosphyina
- Genus: †Motelomama; Pérez García, 2018
- Species: †M. olssoni

Binomial name
- †Motelomama olssoni (Schmidt, 1931)

Synonyms
- "Podocnemis" olssoni Schmidt 1931

Extinct genus of turtles

Motelomama is an extinct genus of bothremydid pleurodiran turtle that was discovered in the Ypresian Salina Group near Negritos, Peru. The genus consists solely of type species M. olssoni.

== Discovery ==
The holotype of Motelomama was discovered 20 miles (32 km) northeast of Negritos, Peru. It consists of a partial shell, originally described as "Podocnemis" olssoni.
