= Eotaphrosphys =

Eotaphrosphys Temporal range: Maastrichtian

Scientific classification
- Domain: Eukaryota
- Kingdom: Animalia
- Phylum: Chordata
- Class: Reptilia
- Order: Testudines
- Suborder: Pleurodira
- Family: †Bothremydidae
- Tribe: †Taphrosphyini
- Subtribe: †Taphrosphyina
- Genus: †Eotaphrosphys; Pérez-García, 2018
- Species: †E. ambiguum

Binomial name
- †Eotaphrosphys ambiguum (Gaudry, 1890)

Genus of reptiles

Eotaphrosphys is an extinct genus of bothremydid pleurodiran turtle that was discovered in the Mont Aime Formation, France. Originally assigned to the genus "Tretosternum", it consists exclusively of type species E. ambiguum.

== Discovery ==
Eotaphrosphys was described in 1890 by Jean Albert Gaudry, under the initial name of "Tretosternum" ambiguum. It was subsequently redescribed and given the name "Taphrosphys" ambiguus, and was redescribed once again in 2018 and assigned the name Eotaphrosophys.
