= Labrostochelys =

Labrostochelys Temporal range: Paleocene

Scientific classification
- Domain: Eukaryota
- Kingdom: Animalia
- Phylum: Chordata
- Class: Reptilia
- Order: Testudines
- Suborder: Pleurodira
- Family: †Bothremydidae
- Tribe: †Taphrosphyini
- Subtribe: †Taphrosphyina
- Genus: †Labrostochelys; Gaffney, 2006
- Species: †L. galkini

Binomial name
- †Labrostochelys galkini Gaffney, 2006

Genus of reptiles

Labrostochelys is an extinct genus of bothremydid pleurodiran turtle that was discovered in the Ouled Abdoun Basin, Morocco. The genus consists solely of type species L. galkini.

== Discovery ==
Labrostochelys was discovered in the Ouled Abdoun Basin of Morocco, primarily known for its Maastrichtian and Paleocene fossils. It is known from a nearly complete skull.
