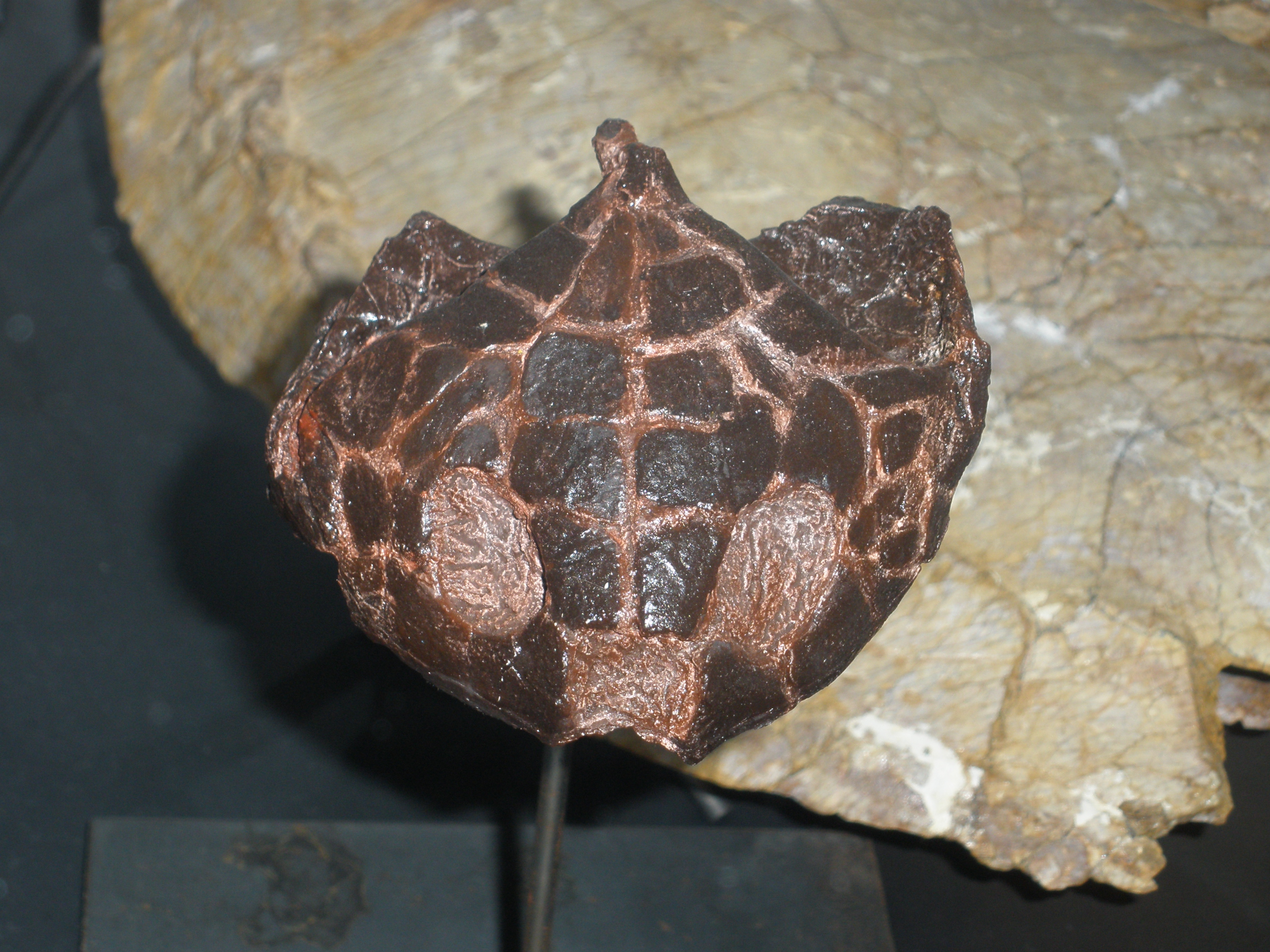
- A fossil skull of Polysternon provinciale.

Scientific classification
- Kingdom: Animalia
- Phylum: Chordata
- Class: Reptilia
- Order: Testudines
- Suborder: Pleurodira
- Family: †Bothremydidae
- Subtribe: †Foxemydina
- Genus: †Polysternon; Portis 1882

Species
- P. isonae Marmi et al. 2012; P. provinciale Matheron 1869 (type)

= Polysternon =

Polysternon Temporal range: Campanian-Maastrichtian ~70.6–66 Ma

Extinct genus of turtles

Polysternon is a genus of turtles in the extinct family Bothremydidae. It was described by Portis in 1882, and contains the species P. provinciale (originally placed in the genus Pleurosternon), which existed during the Cretaceous of what is now France and a new species, P. isonae, from the Late Maastrichtian of Spain.

The species epithet of P. isonae refers to the municipality Isona i Conca Dellà in Catalonia, where the type specimen was discovered in the Tremp Formation.

== Species ==
- Polysternon provinciale Matheron, 1869
- Polysternon isonae Marmi et al., 2012

== Distribution ==
Fossils of Polysternon have been found in:

- Argiles et Grès à Reptiles and Rognacian Formations - France
- Vitoria, Sierra Perenchiza and Tremp Formations - Spain
