= Pleurochayah =

Pleurochayah Temporal range: Cenomanian ~96–95 Ma

Scientific classification
- Domain: Eukaryota
- Kingdom: Animalia
- Phylum: Chordata
- Class: Reptilia
- Order: Testudines
- Suborder: Pleurodira
- Hyperfamily: Pelomedusoides
- Family: †Bothremydidae
- Genus: †Pleurochayah; Adrian et al., 2021
- Species: †P. appalachius

Binomial name
- †Pleurochayah appalachius Adrian et al., 2021

Extinct genus of turtles

Pleurochayah is an extinct genus of bothremydid turtle from the Lewisville Member of the Woodbine Formation in Texas, United States. It is monotypic, with only the type species P. appalachius known.
