= Alberto Souto =

Portuguese politician

Alberto Augusto Simões Souto Ratola
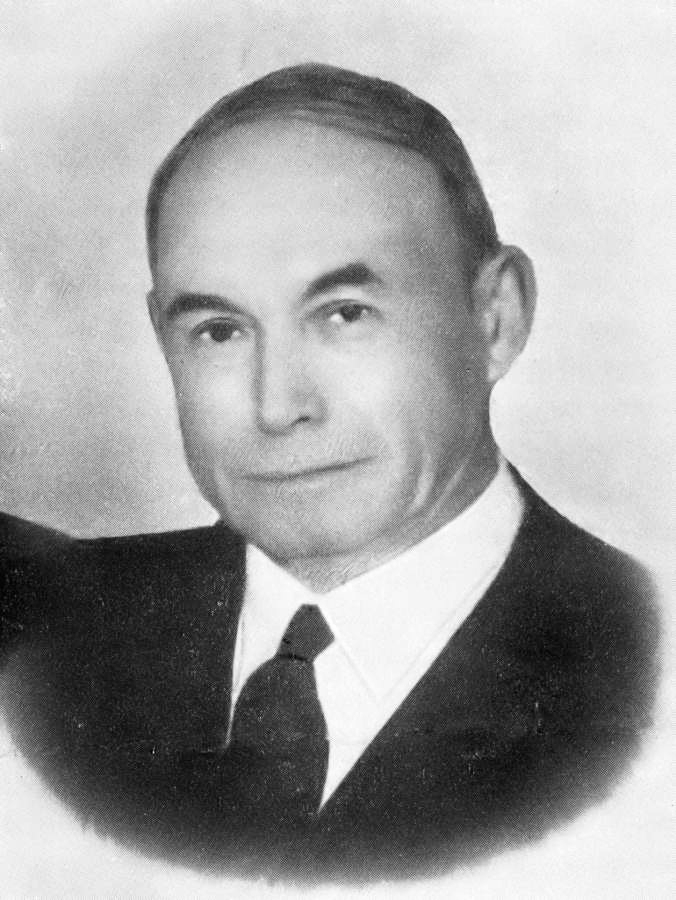
- Born: 23 July 1888; Aradas, Aveiro, Portugal
- Died: 23 October 1961 (aged 73)
- Other names: Dr. Alberto Souto
- Known for: Politics, archaeology, history
- Scientific career
- Fields: Archaeology, history
- Institutions: Museum of Aveiro

Alberto Augusto Simões Souto Ratola (23 July 1888 – 23 October 1961), better known as Alberto Souto, was a Portuguese lawyer, historian, politician and archaeologist. He was a deputy to the National Constituent Assembly of 1911, director of the Aveiro Museum and president of the Aveiro City Council.

== Early life ==
Alberto Souto was born in Aradas, Aveiro, Portugal, on 23 July 1888. He was the son of Manuel Germano Simões Ratola and Rufina Amália da Gama Souto. Destined to a career as a presbyter, he enrolled in the Coimbra Seminary in 1898, at the age of ten. With an early penchant for writing, he started his collaboration with the press very early, writing articles for the newspapers A Vitalidade and Nauta. Having decided not to go to the priesthood, in 1905 he left the seminary and enrolled at the Liceu do Porto and then at the Liceu de Aveiro. He joined the republican student movements and in this last educational establishment, he was elected president of the academy.

Despite being only seventeen years old at the time, he was already deeply involved in this area, having strongly opposed the dictatorial government of João Franco, the so-called Francoist dictatorship, which was in force in the final years of the Portuguese Constitutional Monarchy. Alberto Souto joined the republican student movements early on. He already strongly opposed the Franco dictatorship that prevailed at the end of the monarchy. However, even during the first republic, he ended up being disillusioned with party politics, starting to devote more time to his other areas of interest, namely history (of which he left numerous writings), archaeology (with excavations carried out in different places of the region) and museology (he was director of the Aveiro Museum for several years, having created the respective Section for Prehistoric and Protohistorical Archeology), among others, such as geology, biology and photography. In politics, he held several positions, among them the deputy (he was the second youngest deputy in the Constituent Assembly that drafted the Constitution, after the proclamation of the Republic) and the president of the Municipality of Aveiro.

== Propaganda ==
In 1906, he gave his first public conference entitled Peace, Fatherland and Iberism, and began an intense period of republican propaganda. Despite his youth, in 1910, when the Republic was established, he was appointed administrator of the municipality of Estarreja. That same year he was initiated in Freemasonry, in the Tenacity Lodge of Águeda, under the symbolic name of Beaurepaire.

== Political career ==
In 1911, he founded the newspaper A Liberdade, after belonging to the founding nucleus of O Democrata, and was elected a member of the Republican District Commission of Aveiro and a member of the constituency of Aveiro to the National Constituent Assembly of 1911, being one of the youngest deputies present in the Chamber. In 1913 he was one of the organizers of the Republican Congress that took place that year in Aveiro. He served as a deputy until 1915, always fighting for causes from Aveiro, among which the regulation of cod fishing, the reform of technical education and the works of Aveiro bar. In 1919 he completed his law degree at the University of Coimbra, having actively participated in the fight against the monarchical uprising that became known by the Northern Monarchy. In the following year, he started to work as a lawyer in the city of Aveiro.

== Appointment as mayor and death ==
His disillusionment with the operation led him to move away from active politics, accepting the orderly theses of the Estado Novo, which led him to be appointed Mayor of Aveiro in 1957 at the appointment of the civil governor Francisco Vale Guimarães. He exercised his mandate until his resignation on 12 June 1961. He died on 23 October of the same year.

== Legacy ==
Alberto Souto is remembered in the toponymy of the city of Aveiro and in the Colégio Alberto Souto, meanwhile extinct. The District Archive, is located in the old "Quinta do Forte" where he lived.

In 1940, an extinct turtle, Rosasia soutoi, was named after Souto.
