= Phosphatochelys =

Phosphatochelys Temporal range: Eocene

Scientific classification
- Kingdom: Animalia
- Phylum: Chordata
- Class: Reptilia
- Order: Testudines
- Suborder: Pleurodira
- Family: †Bothremydidae
- Tribe: †Taphrosphyini
- Subtribe: †Taphrosphyina
- Genus: †Phosphatochelys; Gaffney & Tong, 2003
- Species: †P. tedfordi

Binomial name
- †Phosphatochelys tedfordi Gaffney & Tong, 2003

Genus of reptiles

Phosphatochelys ("phosphate turtle") is an extinct genus of bothremydid pleurodiran turtle that was discovered near Oued Zem, Morocco. The genus consists solely of type species P. tedfordi.

== Discovery ==
Phosphatochelys was discovered in the Oued Zem locality of Morocco, and is known from exclusively from a complete 6.8-centimetre-long skull, lacking the lower jaw. The holotype was given to one of the describers by a friend, who had purchased it in France.
