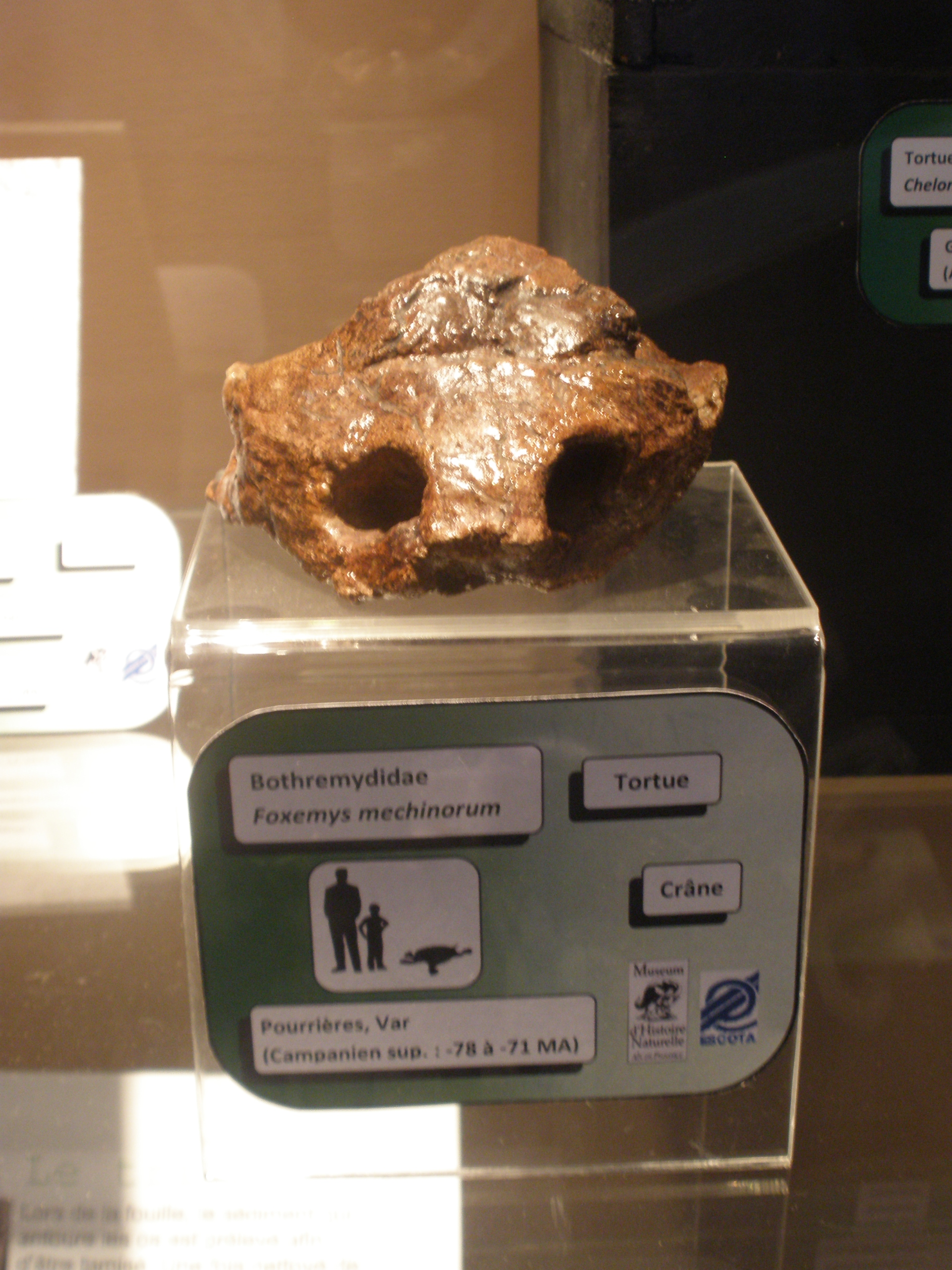
- Fossil of F. mechinorum, an extinct turtle

Scientific classification
- Domain: Eukaryota
- Kingdom: Animalia
- Phylum: Chordata
- Class: Reptilia
- Order: Testudines
- Suborder: Pleurodira
- Family: †Bothremydidae
- Subfamily: †Bothremydinae
- Tribe: †Bothremydini
- Subtribe: †Foxemydina
- Genus: †Foxemys; Tong et al., 1998

Type species
- Foxemys mechinorum Tong et al., 1998

Other species
- †F. trabanti Rabi et al. 2012

= Foxemys =

Foxemys Temporal range: Late Cretaceous, 84.9–66.043 Ma

Extinct genus of turtles

Foxemys is an extinct genus of bothremydid turtle that was discovered at Fox Amphoux, France and also Hungary and Spain. Its skull and shell structure is similar to Polysternon. Two species are in the genus: F. mechinorum and F. trabanti.

== Gallery ==
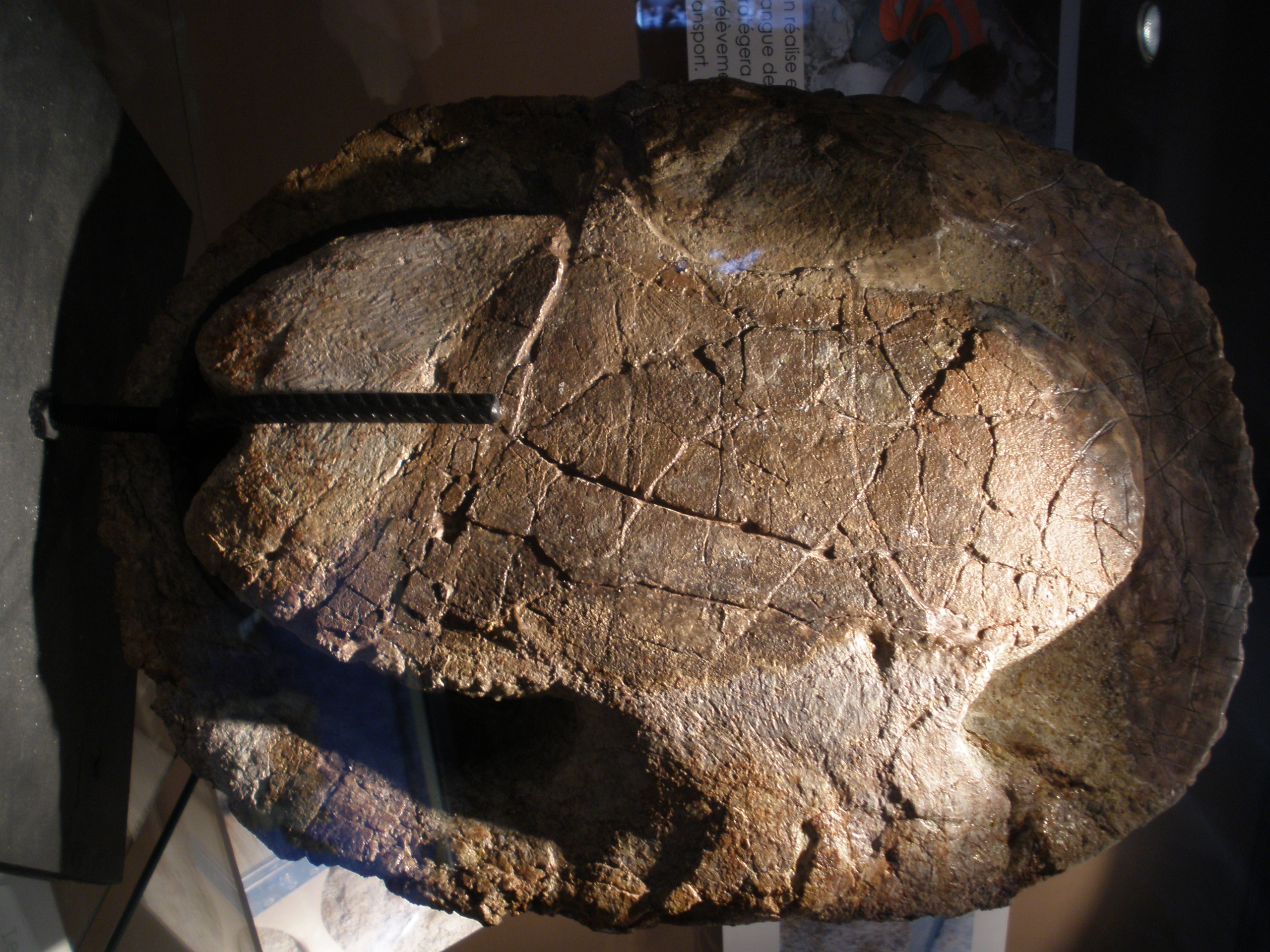
Plastron
