= Ummulisani =

Ummulisani Temporal range: Ypresian

Scientific classification
- Domain: Eukaryota
- Kingdom: Animalia
- Phylum: Chordata
- Class: Reptilia
- Order: Testudines
- Suborder: Pleurodira
- Family: †Bothremydidae
- Tribe: †Taphrosphyini
- Subtribe: †Taphrosphyina
- Genus: †Ummulisani; Gaffney, Tong & Meylan, 2006
- Species: †U. rutgersensis

Binomial name
- †Ummulisani rutgersensis Gaffney, Tong & Meylan, 2006

Genus of reptiles

Ummulisani is an extinct genus of bothremydid pleurodiran turtle that was discovered in the Eocene of Morocco. The genus consists solely of type species U. rutgersensis.

Ummulisani was discovered in the Mrah Iaresh locality, Morocco, which dates to the Ypresian stage of the Eocene. The holotype consists of a skull, lacking the palate, and is curated in the American Museum of Natural History. Two other skulls are known, both also from the Ypresian of Morocco. This turtle is notable for the hornlike protuberances on its prefrontal bones, which may have played a role in burrowing or in mating battles.
