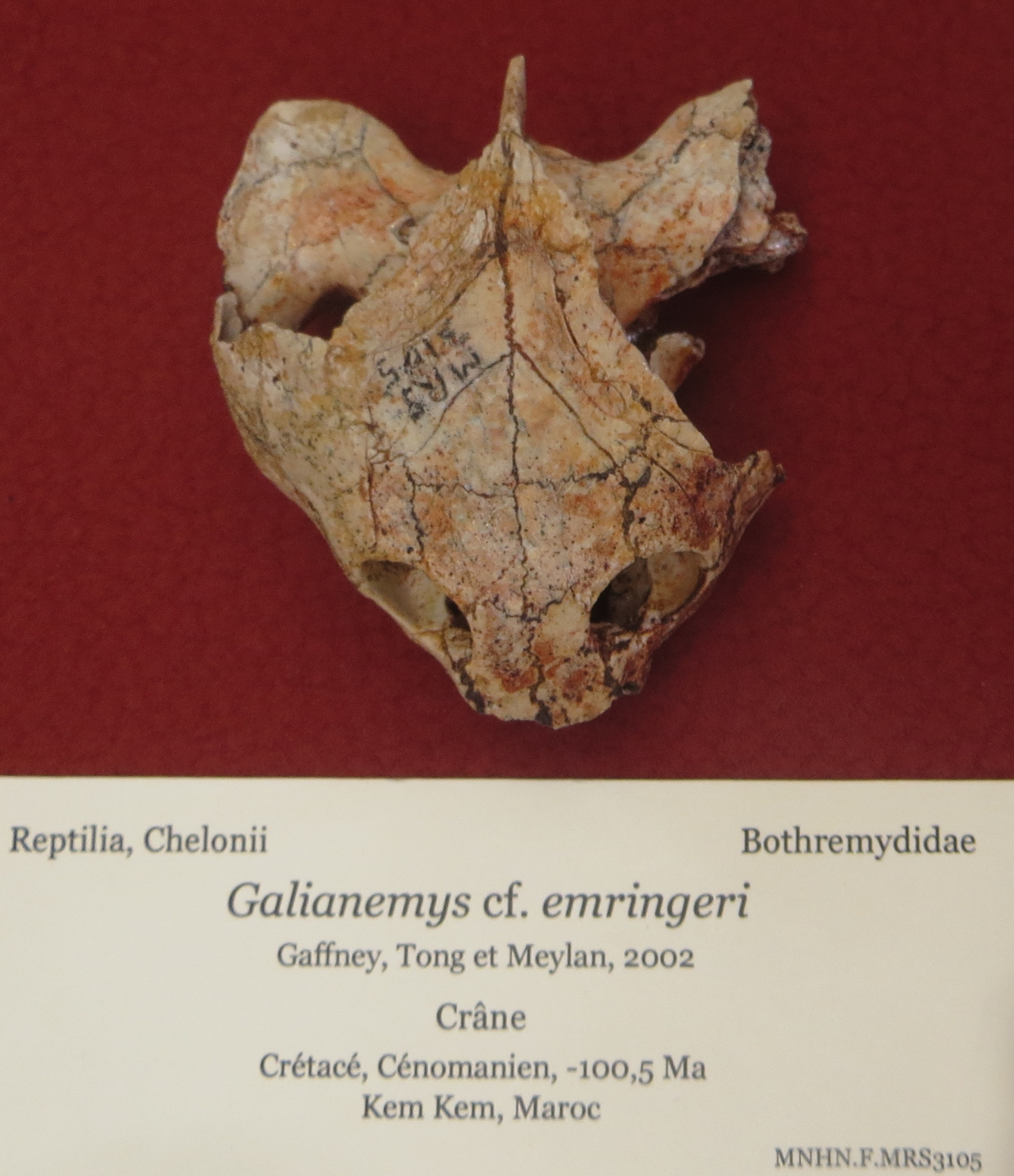
- Skull

Scientific classification
- Domain: Eukaryota
- Kingdom: Animalia
- Phylum: Chordata
- Class: Reptilia
- Order: Testudines
- Suborder: Pleurodira
- Family: †Bothremydidae
- Subfamily: †Bothremydinae
- Tribe: †Cearachelyini
- Genus: †Galianemys; Gaffney, Tong & Meylan, 2002

Species
- Galianemys whitei; Galianemys emringeri

= Galianemys =

Extinct genus of turtle

Galianemys is an extinct genus of turtle in the family Bothremydidae, discovered in the Kem Kem Beds.
