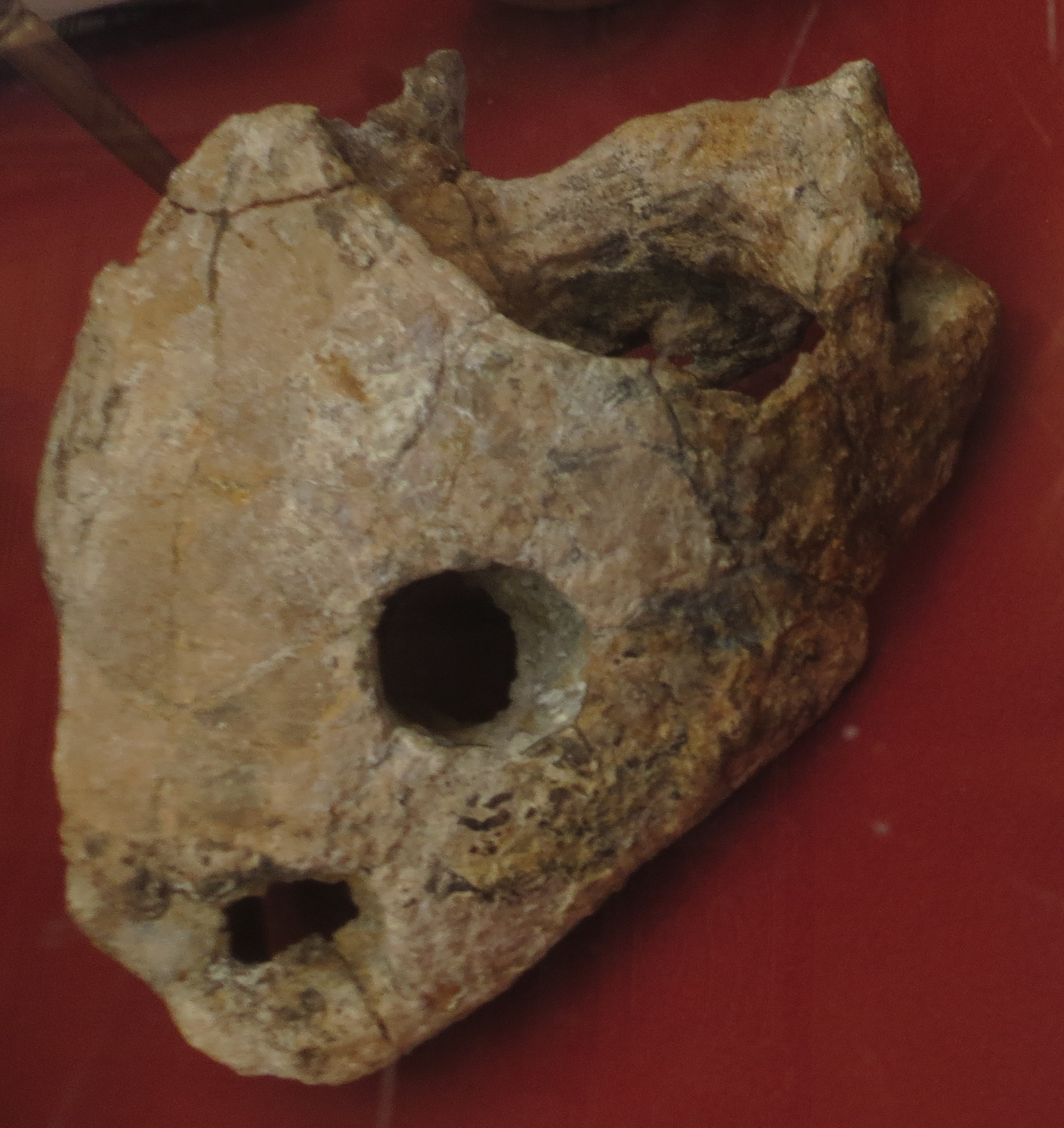
- Nigeremys fossil skull

Scientific classification
- Kingdom: Animalia
- Phylum: Chordata
- Class: Reptilia
- Order: Testudines
- Suborder: Pleurodira
- Family: †Bothremydidae
- Genus: †Nigeremys; Broin, 1977
- Species: †N. gigantea

Binomial name
- †Nigeremys gigantea Broin, 1977

= Nigeremys =

Nigeremys Temporal range: Maastrichtian–Eocene

Genus of reptiles

Nigeremys ("Niger turtle") is an extinct genus of bothremydid pleurodiran turtle from Niger, Mali and Syria. The genus consists exclusively of the combinatio nova of the type species N. gigantea.

== Discovery ==
Nigeremys was described in 1977.
