= Tartaruscola =

Tartaruscola Temporal range: Early Eocene

Scientific classification
- Domain: Eukaryota
- Kingdom: Animalia
- Phylum: Chordata
- Class: Reptilia
- Order: Testudines
- Suborder: Pleurodira
- Family: †Bothremydidae
- Genus: †Tartaruscola; Pérez-García, 2016

Tartaruscola is an extinct genus of bothremydid that inhabited France during the Eocene epoch.
