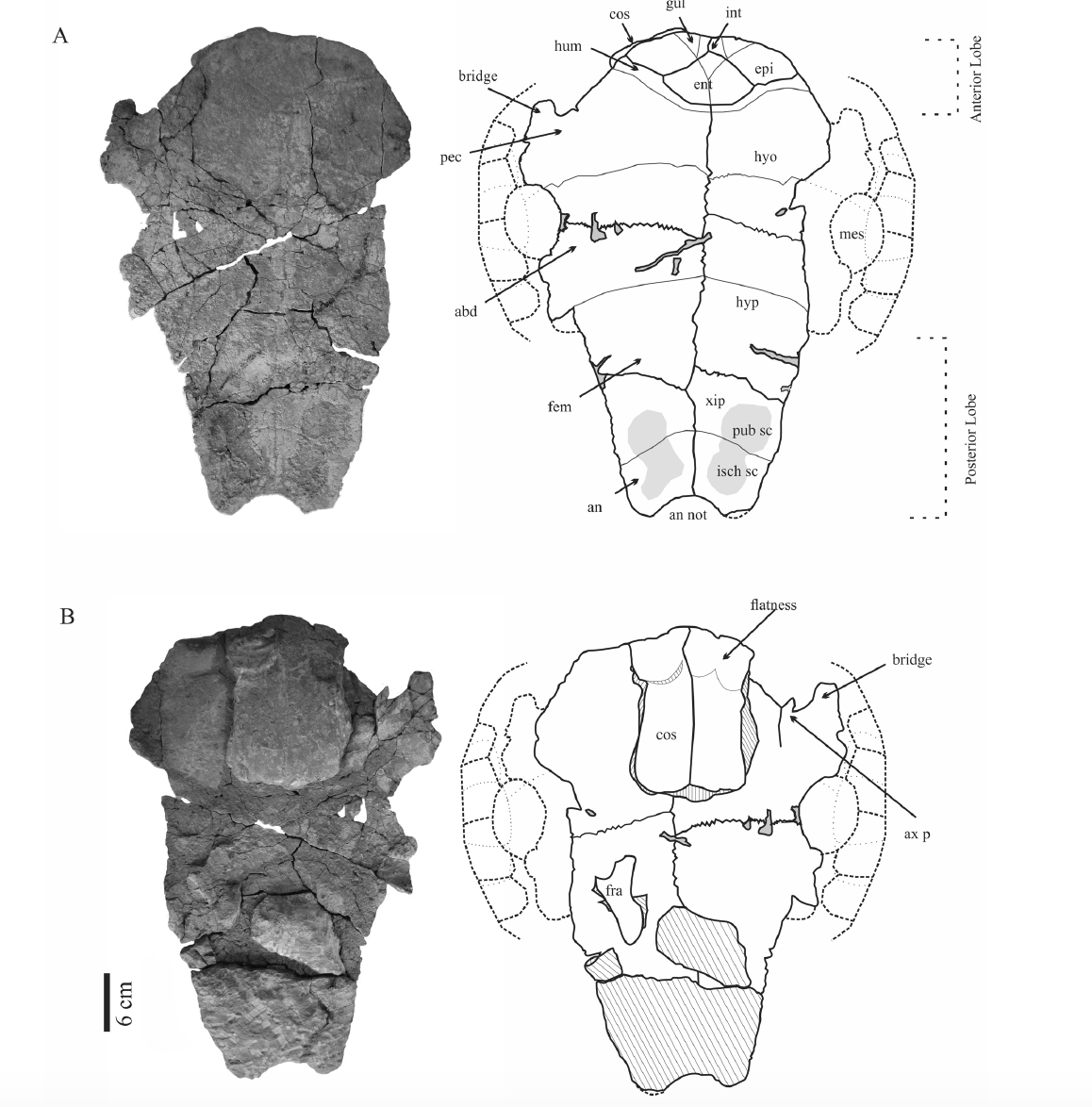
- Plastron of Inaechelys, taken from Carvalho et al. (c2016)

Scientific classification
- Kingdom: Animalia
- Phylum: Chordata
- Class: Reptilia
- Order: Testudines
- Suborder: Pleurodira
- Family: †Bothremydidae
- Subfamily: †Bothremydinae
- Tribe: †Bothremydini
- Subtribe: †Bothremydina
- Genus: †Inaechelys de Araujo Carvalho et al., 2016
- Species: †I. pernambucensis

Binomial name
- †Inaechelys pernambucensis de Araujo Carvalho et al., 2016

= Inaechelys =

Inaechelys Temporal range: Danian (Tiupampan) ~66–61 Ma

Genus of reptiles

Inaechelys is a potentially dubious genus of bothremydid pleurodiran turtle that was discovered in the Maria Farinha Formation of Brazil. The genus consists solely of type species I. pernambucensis.

== Discovery ==
Inaechelys was discovered in the Poty Cement Quarry, in Paulista, Brazil in 2005, by a team from the Federal University of Pernambuco.

== Description ==
The holotype consists of a carapace, which is fragmented but almost complete. The mesoplastron is not preserved, though its outline is still visible. The anal notch is small, semicircular and wider than it is deep.

== Taxonomy ==
Pedro Romano placed the species in the genus Rosasia in 2016.
