= Arenila =

Arenila Temporal range: Maastrichtian

Scientific classification
- Kingdom: Animalia
- Phylum: Chordata
- Class: Reptilia
- Order: Testudines
- Suborder: Pleurodira
- Family: †Bothremydidae
- Clade: †Bothremydodda
- Tribe: †Taphrosphyini
- Genus: †Arenila; De Broin & Werner, 1998
- Species: †A. krebsi

Binomial name
- †Arenila krebsi De Broin & Werner, 1998

Genus of reptiles

Arenila is an extinct genus of bothremydid pleurodiran turtle that was discovered in the Western Desert of Egypt. The genus consists solely of type species A. krebsi.

== Discovery ==
Arenila was discovered in the Ammonite Hill Member of the Dakhla Formation, Egypt, which dates back to the Maastrichtian.

== Description ==
The holotype of Arenila is a partial skull. Most of the prefrontal is preserved on the skull's left side, but lacks the anterior margin, while the right side is completely missing. The sutures are clearly visible, with the bone edges being slightly displaced. The prefrontal is broken by a parasagittal crack running from the frontal suture to the eroded edge of the prefrontal.

== Etymology ==
The generic name of Arenila is derived from the Latin arena "sand".
