= Sankuchemys =

Sankuchemys Temporal range: Late Cretaceous

Scientific classification
- Domain: Eukaryota
- Kingdom: Animalia
- Phylum: Chordata
- Class: Reptilia
- Order: Testudines
- Suborder: Pleurodira
- Family: †Bothremydidae
- Tribe: †Kurmademydini
- Genus: †Sankuchemys; Gaffney et al., 2003

Species
- Sankuchemys sethnai

Extinct genus of turtles

Sankuchemys is an extinct genus of side-necked turtle whose fossils had been found in the Intertrappean Formation of India during the late Cretaceous period. It was first named by Eugene S. Gaffney, Ashok Sahni, Herman Schleich, Swarn Deep Singh, and Rahul Srivastava in 2003, and contains the species Sankuchemys sethnai.
