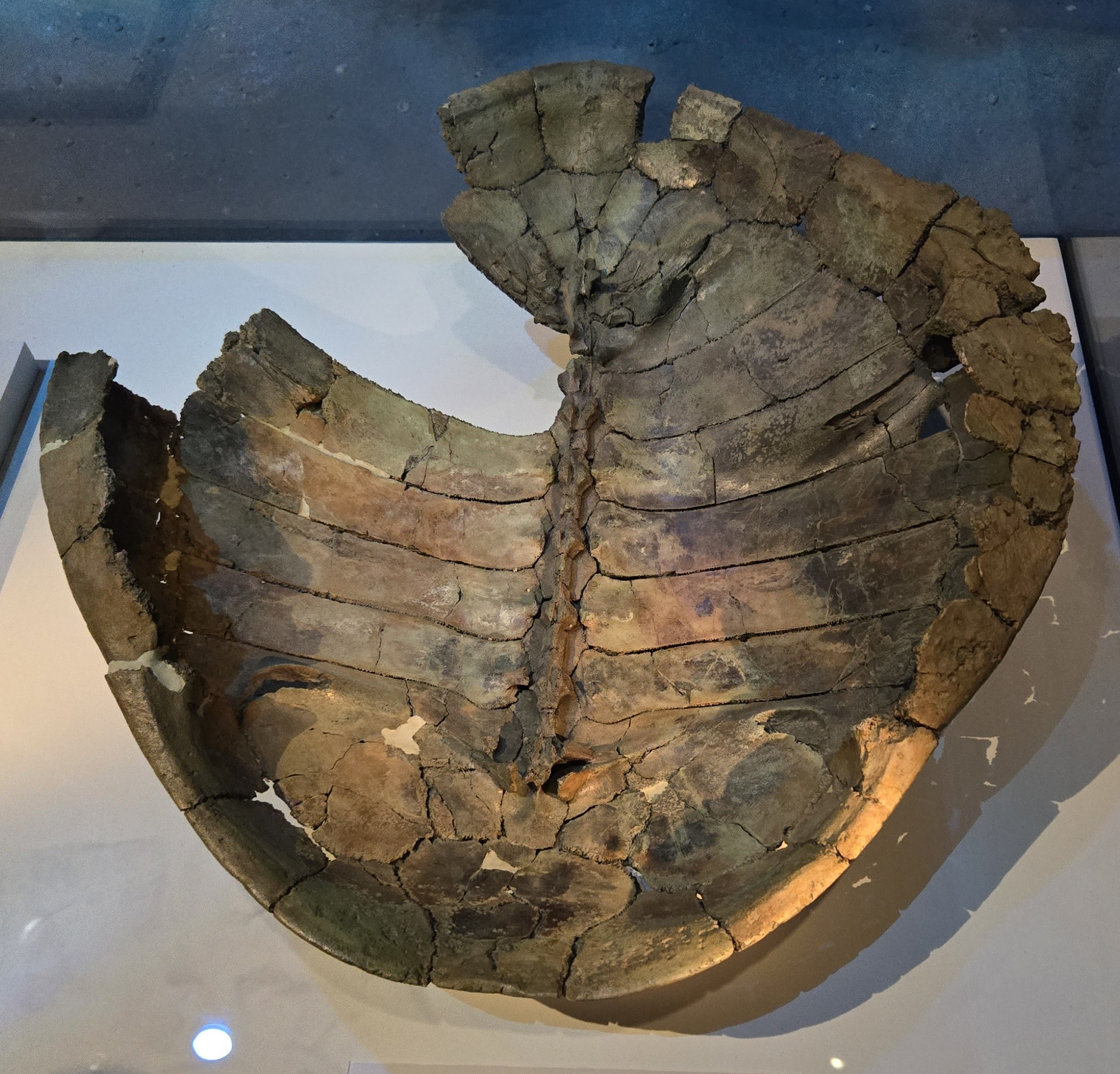
- Carapace at Edelman Fossil Park

Scientific classification
- Kingdom: Animalia
- Phylum: Chordata
- Class: Reptilia
- Order: Testudines
- Suborder: Pleurodira
- Family: †Bothremydidae
- Tribe: †Taphrosphyini
- Subtribe: †Taphrosphyina
- Genus: †Taphrosphys; Cope, 1869

Type species
- Platemys sulcatus Leidy, 1856

Species
- † T. congolensis Dollo, 1913; † T. ippolitoi Gaffney et al., 2006; † T. sulcatus Leidy, 1856

= Taphrosphys =

Taphrosphys Temporal range: Maastrichtian

Genus of reptiles

Taphrosphys is an extinct genus of bothremydid pleurodiran turtle that was discovered Angola, Morocco and the United States. The genus consists of type species T. sulcatus (originally Platemys sulcatus), T. ippolitoi, T. congolensis, and the dubious T. dares.

== Discovery ==
The holotype of Taphrosphys sulcatus was discovered in New Jersey at the site of the current Edelman Fossil Park and Museum. The species Taphrosphys congolensis is known from Angola while Taphrosphys ippolitoi was found in the Ouled Abdoun Basin in Morocco.
