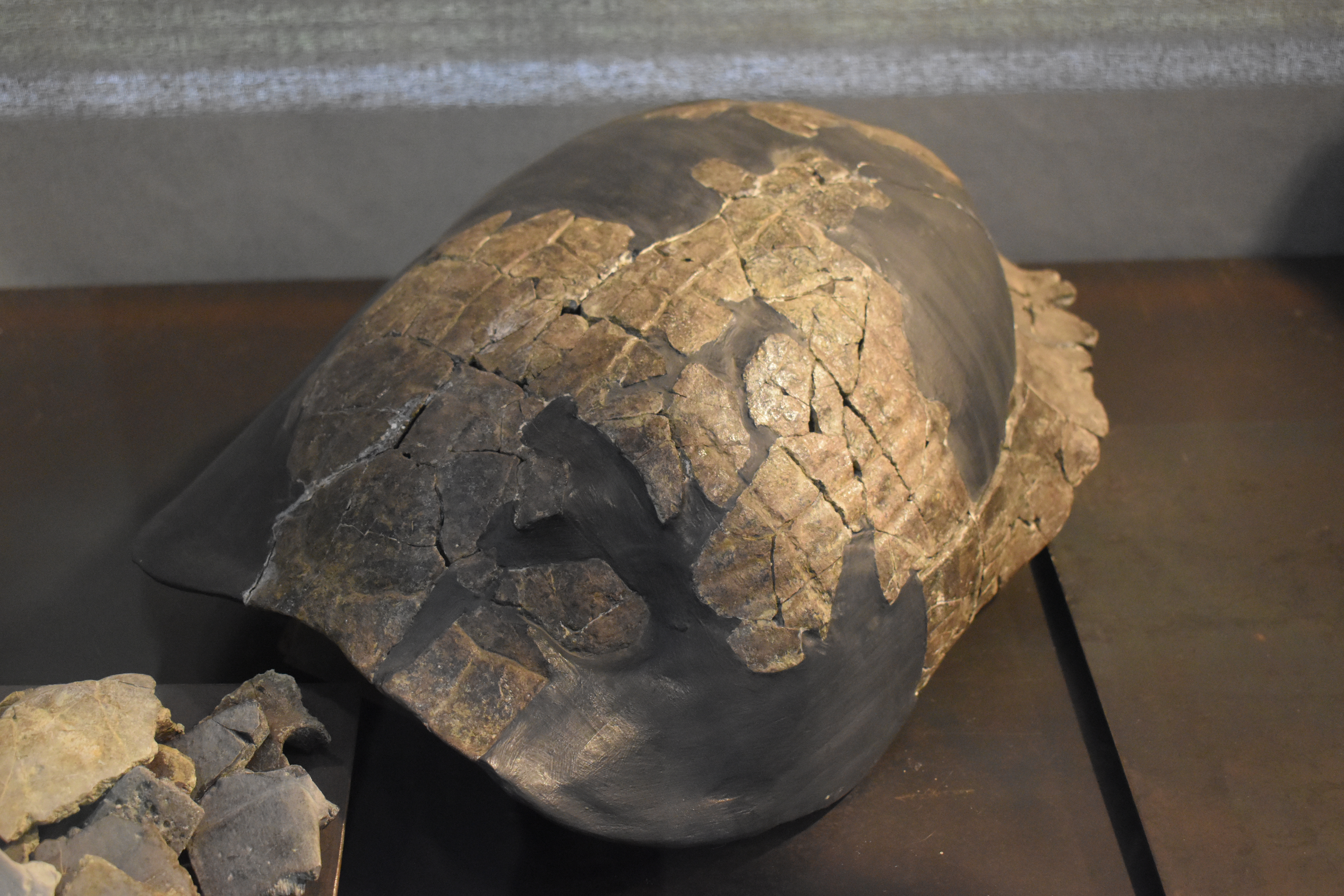

Scientific classification
- Kingdom: Animalia
- Phylum: Chordata
- Class: Reptilia
- Order: Testudines
- Suborder: Cryptodira
- Family: Testudinidae
- Genus: †Fontainechelon; Pérez-García et al., 2016

= Fontainechelon =

Fontainechelon Temporal range: Early Eocene (Early Ypresian)

Fontainechelon is an extinct genus of testudinid from Saint Papoul, France during the Early Eocene. It is known from a single species, F. cassouleti.

Fontainechelon is the oldest European testudinid, and the most basal of all testudinids.

== Etymology ==
It was named after Jean de La Fontaine, alluding to some of his fables in which the protagonist was a tortoise.

== Taxonomy ==
Fontainechelon cassouleti was historically considered a species of Achilemys. The genus Achilemys is now restricted to North America. Fontainechelon was found to be the most basal of all testudinids.

== Description ==
The species is known primarily from the holotype, which includes a partial carapace, a complete plastron, the right humerus, and the left femur. There are also several highly fragmentary referred specimens. The holotype had an estimated shell length of 37 cm.
