= Kurmademys =

Kurmademys Temporal range: Late Cretaceous 70.6–66 Ma

Scientific classification
- Domain: Eukaryota
- Kingdom: Animalia
- Phylum: Chordata
- Class: Reptilia
- Order: Testudines
- Suborder: Pleurodira
- Family: †Bothremydidae
- Tribe: †Kurmademydini
- Genus: †Kurmademys; Gaffney et al., 2001

Species
- Kurmademys kallamedensis

Extinct genus of turtles

Kurmademys is an extinct genus of side-necked turtle which existed in India during the late Cretaceous period. It was first named in 2001, by Eugene S. Gaffney, Sankar Chatterjee, and Dhiraj K. Rudra, and contains the species Kurmademys kallamedensis. The species name is derived from the Kallamedu Formation of southern India, where the type specimen of the genus was discovered. It was assigned to the family Bothremydidae.
