= Rosasia =

Rosasia Temporal range: Campanian–Maastrichtian

Scientific classification
- Kingdom: Animalia
- Phylum: Chordata
- Class: Reptilia
- Order: Testudines
- Suborder: Pleurodira
- Family: †Bothremydidae
- Subfamily: †Bothremydinae
- Tribe: †Bothremydini
- Subtribe: †Bothremydina
- Genus: †Rosasia; Carrington da Costa, 1940
- Species: †R. sotoui

Binomial name
- †Rosasia sotoui Carrington da Costa, 1940

Extinct genus of turtles

Rosasia is an extinct genus of bothremydid pleurodiran turtle that was discovered in the Argilas de Aveiro Formation of Portugal. The genus consists of a single species, R. soutoi, named after Alberto Souto.

== Description ==
Rosasia is distinguished by a skull with a moderately obtuse V-shape, less so than in Bothremys cooki. The orbits are less reduced than Bothremys, though the external nostril is unusually narrow for the group. The maxillae are greatly enlarged, and there is a strong ventral expansion of the quadratojugal. The first vertebra of the carapace largelyu covers the entire nuchal, as in Bothremys parva. The vertebrae themselves are relatively narrow.

== Taxonomy ==
In a provisional phylogeny, Antunes & Broin (1988) classified Rosasia as the sister genus to Bothremys. A 2016 paper by Carvalho et al recovered Rosasia sotoui as the sister taxon of the newly described Inaechelys pernambucensis; a few months later, another paper synonymized the two genera, with Rosasia taking precedent.
