= Aradas =

Civil parish in Portugal

- Civil parish
- Location in Portugal
- Coordinates: 40.610°N 8.648°W
- Country: Portugal
- Region: Centro
- Intermunic. comm.: Região de Aveiro
- District: Aveiro
- Municipality: Aveiro

Area
  - Total: 8.93 km^{2} (3.45 sq mi)

Population (2011)
  - Total: 9,157
  - Density: 1,000/km^{2} (2,700/sq mi)
- Time zone: UTC+00:00 (WET)
  - Summer (DST): UTC+01:00 (WEST)

Aradas is a civil parish in Aveiro Municipality, Aveiro District, Portugal. The population in 2011 was 9,157, in an area of 8.93 km^{2}.
