= Laophis =

Laophis Temporal range: Pliocene

Scientific classification
- Kingdom: Animalia
- Phylum: Chordata
- Class: Reptilia
- Order: Squamata
- Suborder: Serpentes
- Family: Viperidae
- Genus: †Laophis
- Species: †L. crotaloides

Binomial name
- †Laophis crotaloides (Owen, 1857)

Genus of snakes

Laophis (From Ancient Greek, stone snake) is a genus of viperid snake currently containing one known species that lived during the Pliocene in Northern Greece. Few fossil vertebrae of this species was found in Thessaloniki, Greece. It reached a total length possibly exceeding 3 m (9.8 ft) and a mass of up to 26 kg (57 lb), making this perhaps the largest viper discovered yet. Originally described by Sir Richard Owen, the original fossils had been lost, until a single vertebra was discovered somewhere near Thessaloniki in 2014.
