= Blufftown Formation =

Mesozoic geologic formation in the southern United States

- Stratigraphic range: Campanian
- Type: Geological formation

Location
- Region: Alabama, Georgia
- Country: United States

The Blufftown Formation is a Mesozoic geologic formation in the southern United States. Dinosaur remains are among the fossils that have been recovered from the formation, although none have yet been referred to a specific genus except "Coelosaurus" antiquus. Indeterminate hadrosaur and tyrannosaur fossils have been found here. Fish fossils have been found here too. Ostracod fossils have also been unearthed here too.

== See also ==
- List of dinosaur-bearing rock formations
  - List of stratigraphic units with indeterminate dinosaur fossils
