= Rognacian Formation =

Geologic formation in France

- Stratigraphic range: Maastrichtian
- Type: Formation

Location
- Region: Provence-Alpes-Côte d'Azur, Bouches-du-Rhône, Var
- Country: France
- Extent: Aix-en-Provence Basin

The Rognacian Formation is a geologic formation in France. It is of Maastrichtian age. The mammal Valentinella is known from the formation, alongside indeterminate dinosaur remains.

== Geological setting ==
The Upper Cretaceous continental deposits in southern France are distributed from the east to the west. The solid fragmented materials are characteristic of floodplain environments, with special deposits. There are alternating beds of fluvial channels and paleosols.

== See also ==
- List of fossiliferous stratigraphic units in France
