= Bothremys =

Bothremys Temporal range: Maastrichtian–Paleocene

Scientific classification
- Domain: Eukaryota
- Kingdom: Animalia
- Phylum: Chordata
- Class: Reptilia
- Order: Testudines
- Suborder: Pleurodira
- Family: †Bothremydidae
- Subfamily: †Bothremydinae
- Tribe: †Bothremydini
- Subtribe: †Bothremydina
- Genus: †Bothremys; Leidy, 1865

Type species
- †Bothremys cooki Leidy, 1865

Other species
- †B. arabicus Zalmout et al., 2005; †B. kellyi Gaffney et al., 2006; †B. maghrebiana Gaffney et al., 2006

Genus of reptiles

Bothremys is an extinct genus of bothremydid pleurodiran turtle that was discovered near Gloucester, New Jersey. The genus consists of type species B. cooki, B. arabicus, B. kellyi, and B. maghrebiana.

== Discovery ==
The holotype of Bothremys was discovered in the greensand formations near Gloucester Township, New Jersey, and obtained by Joseph Leidy in 1862. It consists of a partially-complete skull and a lower jaw.

== Description ==
In Leidy's 1865 description, he notes that the skull lacks the auditory passages, zygomatic arches, and some other minor bones. The lower jaw completely lacks the condyloid joint, which had apparently been destroyed. The top of the skull is nearly flat, with a slight forward incline. The orbits are relatively small, facing outwards and forwards. A deep conical pit occupies each maxilla, which led Leidy to suggest the presence of a tooth-like protuberance. The orbit are separated from the temporal process by a bony "wall" composed of sections of several different skull bones.
