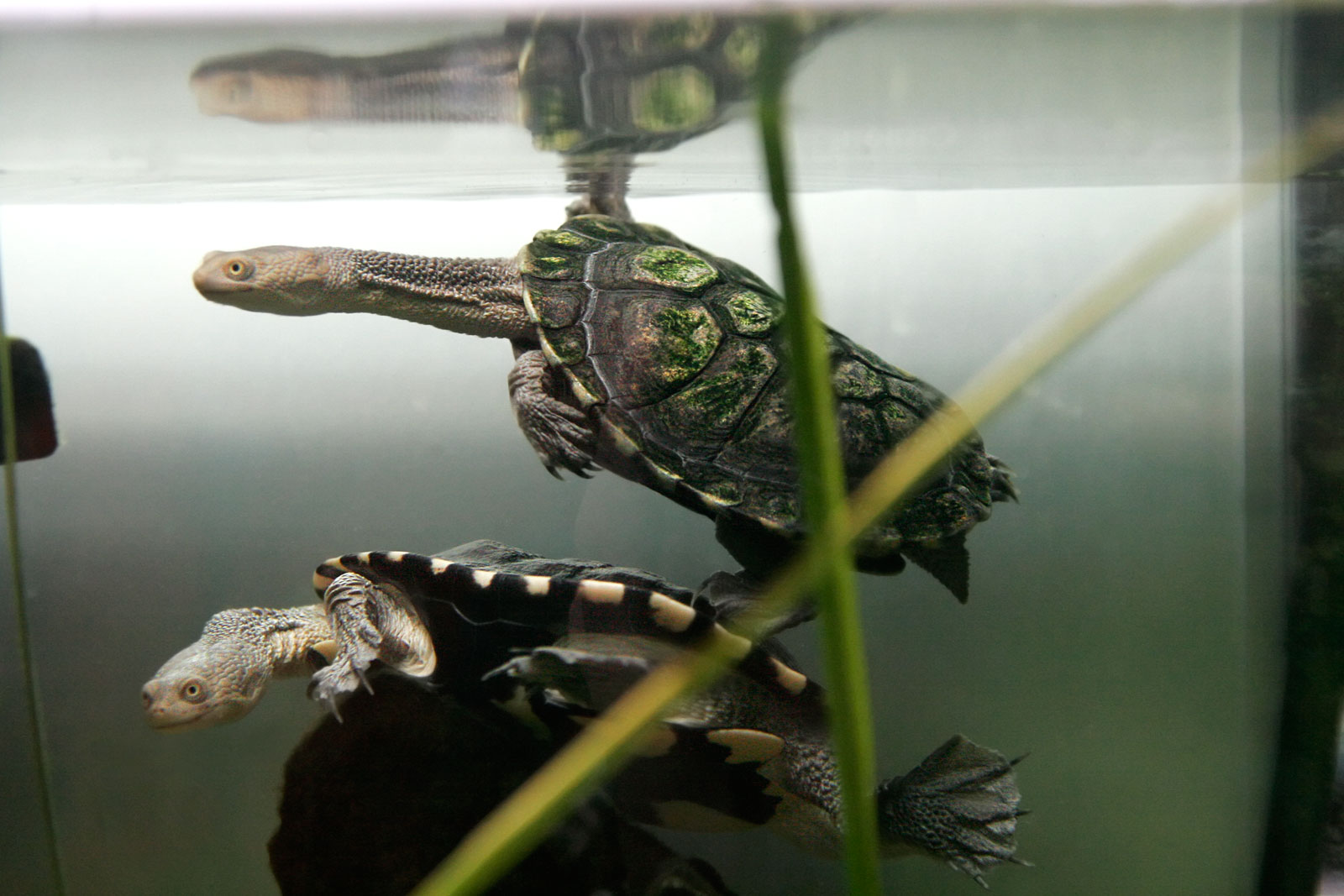
- Eastern long-necked turtle Chelodina longicollis

Scientific classification
- Kingdom: Animalia
- Phylum: Chordata
- Class: Reptilia
- Order: Testudines
- Clade: Pan-Pleurodira
- Suborder: Pleurodira; Cope, 1865

Synonyms
- Pleuroderes - Duméril and Bibron 1834:354; Pleurodera - Lichtenstein 1856:2; Pleurodera - Cope 1864:181

= Pleurodira =

Pleurodira Temporal range: Late Jurassic to present, 163–0 Ma

Suborder of turtles

The Pleurodira are one of the two living suborders of turtles (the other being the Cryptodira) more known commonly as the side-necked turtles. The name "Pleurodira" translates to "side neck", whereas the Cryptodira are known as hidden-necked turtles; these names reflect the distinct neck retraction mechanisms between the two suborders, which are the product of diverging evolutionary histories. Within the Pleurodira, three living families are represented: Chelidae, the Austro-South American side-necked turtles, the Pelomedusidae, the African mud terrapins, and the Podocnemididae, the American side-neck river turtles.

Pleurodiran turtles are currently restricted to the freshwater ecosystems of former Gondwanan landmasses, including in Australia, South America, Arabia, Madagascar and Africa. Prehistorically, they were a cosmopolitan clade during the Cretaceous and most of the Cenozoic, and even occurred in marine environments around the world.

== Description ==
Neck retraction mechanism in cryptodirans and pleurodirans.

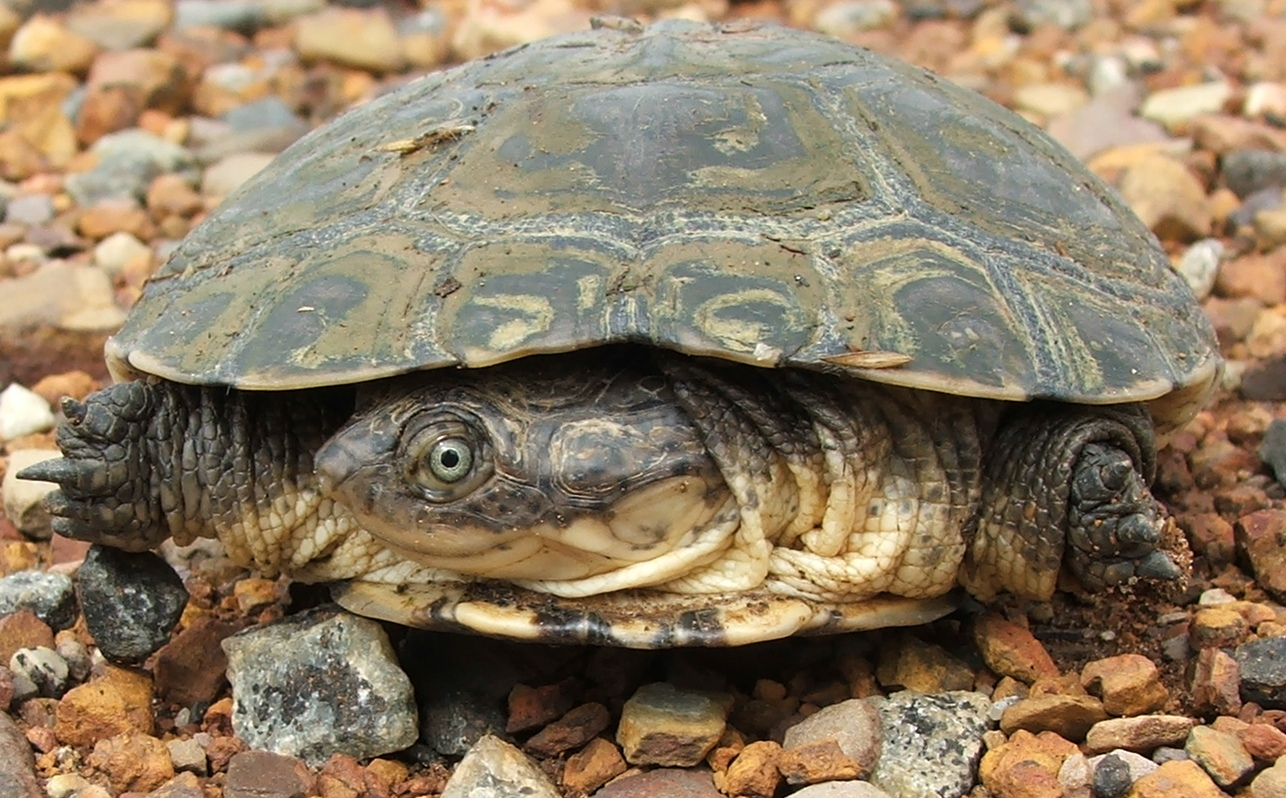
Pelomedusa subrufa

The Pleurodira are identified by the method with which they withdraw their heads into their shells. In these turtles, the neck is bent in the horizontal plane, drawing the head into a space in front of one of the front legs. A larger overhang of the carapace helps to protect the neck, which remains partially exposed after retraction. This differs from the method employed by a cryptodiran, which tucks its head and neck between its forelegs, within the shell.

The different methods of bending the neck require completely different anatomies of the cervical vertebrae. All extant turtles studied so far have eight vertebrae in the neck. In the Pleurodira, these vertebrae are narrow in cross-section and spool-shaped with biconvex centra on one or more of the cervicals. These centra act as a double joint, allowing a large degree of sideways movement and providing a means of folding the neck onto itself in the lateral plane. Conversely, in the Cryptodira, the neck bones are wide and flat. The biconvex centra in some of the cryptodiran cervicals allow the neck to fold onto itself in the vertical plane.

Pleurodirans also differ from cryptodirans in the emarginations of their skulls. Skull emargination provides room and anchorage for the jaw muscles. The connection points and the position of the emarginations relate to different bones of the skull.

Another difference is in the arrangement of the bones of the shell and the scutes overlaying them. Pleurodiran turtles have 13 scutes on the plastron of the shell, whereas cryptodiran turtles have only 12. The extra scute is called the intergular and is at the front of the plastron between the gular scutes. Pelomedusid turtles also possess mesoplastra, further differentiating this group.

The jaw closure mechanism has articulation on trochlear surfaces of the pterygoid.

=== Suction feeding ===
One of the three extant families in this suborder is the family Chelidae, which have a specially adapted strategy for catching prey. While the majority of the family Chelidae are omnivores, 17 species are carnivorous: Chelus fimbriatus and species of the Chelodina genus. This special strategy is referred to as a gape-suck mechanism. The turtle first opens its mouth little by little. Then, when the turtle is within striking range of the prey, it will open its mouth completely, sucking in water at such a rate that the current into its mouth is too strong for prey to escape and it engulfs the prey within 0.004 seconds. This strategy also circumvents issues to quick capture of underwater prey, such as resistance to rapid movement in water, pressure waves due to a rapid strike, and rapid water intake when feeding.

== Taxonomy ==
After Ferreria, et al. 2018.

- Panpleurodira
  - †Dortokidae (extinct) (Early Cretaceous–Paleocene)
  - †Platychelyidae (extinct) (Late Jurassic–Early Cretaceous)
  - Pleurodira
    - Chelidae (20 genera)
    - Pan-Pelomedusoides
      - †Araripemydidae (extinct) (Early Cretaceous)
      - †Euraxemydidae (extinct)
      - Pelomedusoides
        - Pelomedusidae (two genera)
        - †Francemys (extinct) (Early Cretaceous)
        - †Sahonachelyidae (extinct) (Late Cretaceous)
        - †Bothremydidae (extinct) (Early Cretaceous–Miocene)
        - Podocnemidoidae
          - †Peiropemydidae (extinct)
          - Podocnemididae (three extant, many extinct genera)
