= Hadrogeneios =

Hadrogeneios Temporal range: Paleocene, 61–57 Ma

Scientific classification
- Kingdom: Animalia
- Phylum: Chordata
- Class: Mammalia
- Infraclass: Placentalia
- Magnorder: Atlantogenata
- Superorder: Afrotheria
- Clade: Paenungulatomorpha
- Genus: †Hadrogeneios; Gheerbrant, 2023

Type species
- Hadrogeneios phosphaticus Gheerbrant, 2023

Extinct Afrotherian mammal

Hadrogeneios is an extinct genus of afrotherian mammal recovered from the Khouribga Phosphates of the Ouled Abdoun Basin dating from the Selandian to the Thanetian. Only the type species H. phosphaticus is known for this genus, with the material being of dental and jaw specimens. The placement of Hadrogeneios recovered it to be the most basal stem-paenungulate, the clade that includes elephants, sea cows, and hyraxes. Despite this Hadrogeneios was a contemporary of more derived members of the group such as Abdounodus, Ocepeia, and the early proboscideans Eritherium, Phosphatherium, and Daouitherium.

== Discovery and naming ==
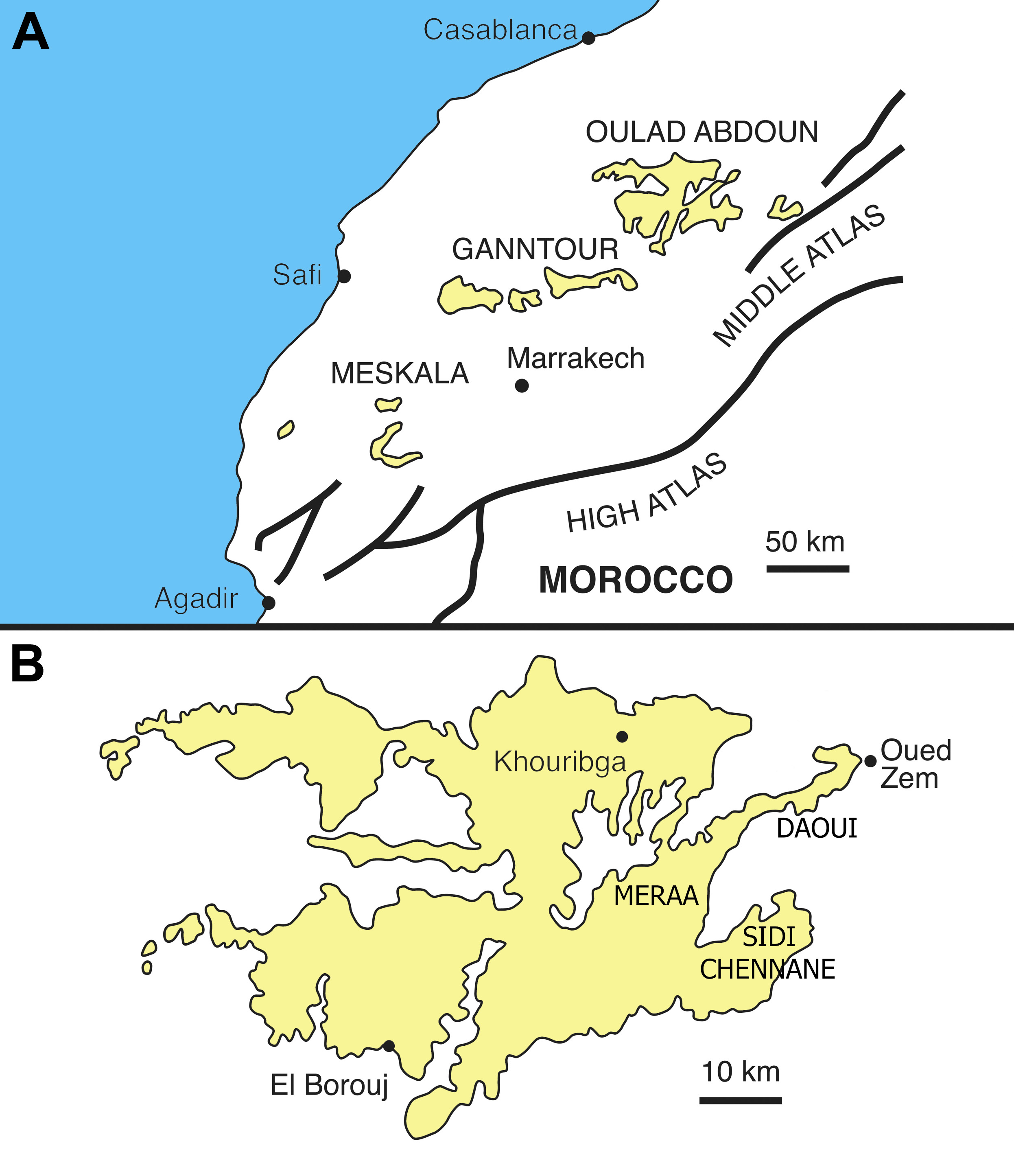
The Ouled Abdoun Basin and other major phosphate basins of Morocco (A) and key fossil localities of the Ouled Abdoun (B): Grand Daoui, Meraa El Arech, and Sidi Chennane

The known material of Hadrogeneios were collected from the local people from an unknown site in Ouled Abdoun Basin, though it is inferred they come from the Sidi Chennane quarry. Geochemical studies of the Paleocene mammals show phosphate intervals which suggested the bed of which Hadrogeneios came from was between the top of Bed IIb and the base of Bed IIa, which correlates to the Selandian to early Thanetian. The specimens consisted of the holotype (MHNM.KHG.227), which has a mandibular symphysis with some partial left dentary, two sockets for the incisors, the first lower canine, and the first to third premolars. Additionally there is also the presence of the fourth premolar and first molar, and an isolated left third molar. Several paratypes have also been described and those contain additional tooth remains and jaw fragments.

=== Etymology ===
The genus name of Hadrogeneios is composed of the Greek words hadros ("strong") and geneion ("chin") due to the presence of the large anterior part of the lower mandible. The specific name phosphaticus derives from the phosphate beds it was recovered from. Therefore this early afrotherian is the "phosphate strong chin".

== Description ==
Hadrogeneios is only known from the aforementioned gnathic and dental remains. Gheerbrant (2023) performed a CT scanning on the specimens in order to create 3D digital to create a composite reconstruction of the lower mandible. Based on the reconstruction, Hadrogeneios had a lower dental formal of 3i–c–4p–3m, a formula shared with basal placental or stem-placental eutherian mammals. There are three postcanine diastemata. The first one is located between the lower canine and the first lower premolar, the second (longest) is between first and second premolars, and the third (shortest) between the second and third premolars. When comparing the lower mandible of Hadrogeneios to Ocepeia, the anterior lower tooth row is elongated in the former genus. The upper dentition is known from the second and third upper molars.

== Classification ==
Below is a cladogram of the placement of Hadrogeneios based on a strict consensus of 180 MPTs from unweighted and unconstrained standard analysis with TNT 1.5 and with ordered characters:

- Paenungulatomorpha
  - †Hadrogeneios
  - - †Ocepeia
    - - †Abdounodus
      - - Paenungulata
          - Hyracoidea
          - - †Embrithopoda
            - - Tethytheria
                - Sirenia
                - Proboscidea
