= Ouled Abdoun Basin =

Phosphate basin in Morocco

- Stratigraphic range: Maastrichtian-Ypresian; ~70.6–47.8 Ma
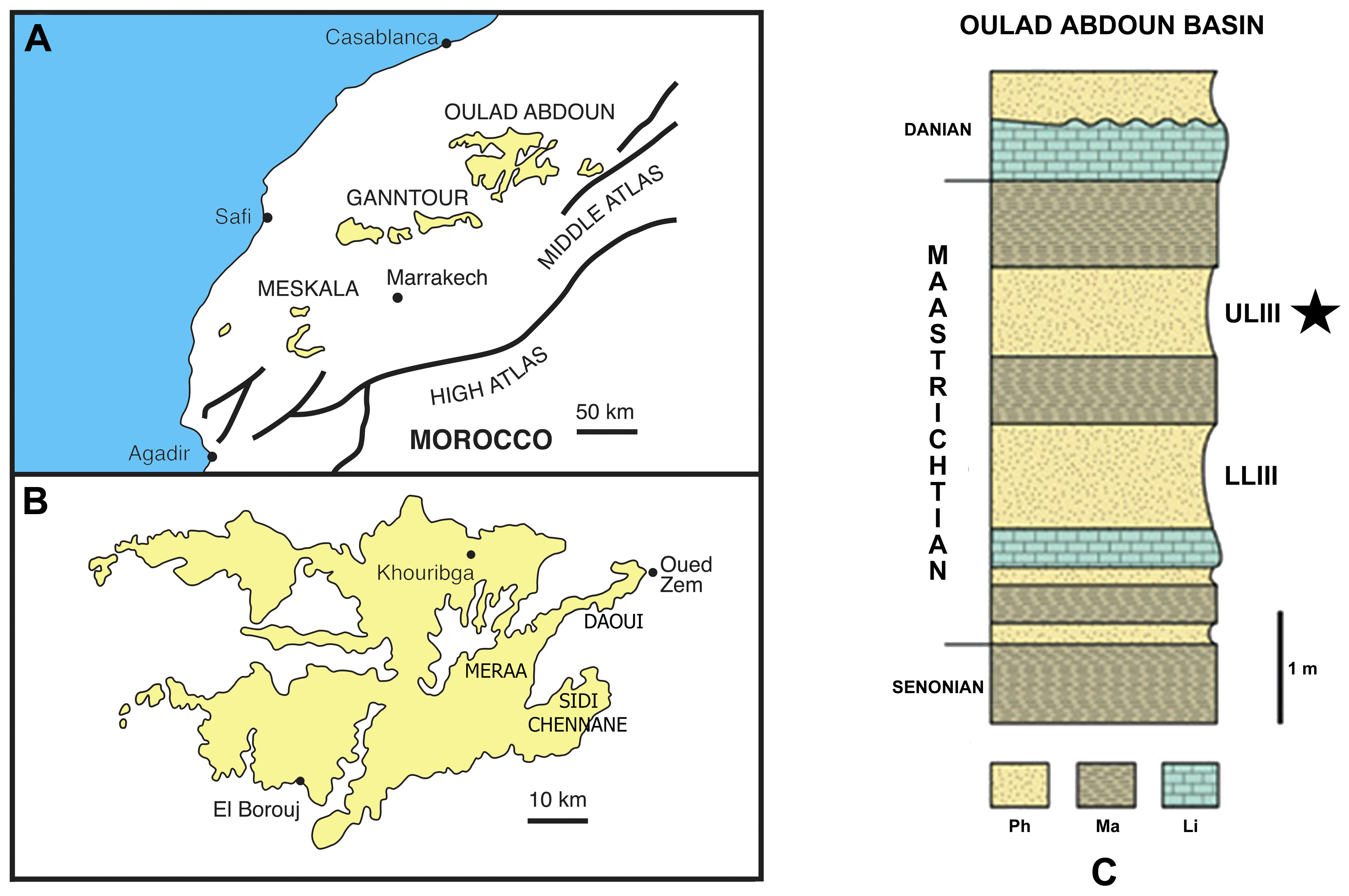
- The Oulad Abdoun and other major phosphate basins (in yellow) of Morocco
- Type: Geological formation
- Unit of: Sedimentary Basins

Lithology
- Primary: Phosphorite
- Other: Clay, Limestone, Sandstone

Location
- Coordinates: 32°53′N 6°55′W
- Approximate paleocoordinates: 24°2′N 6°8′W
- Region: Béni Mellal-Khénifra, Khouribga
- Country: Morocco
- Ouled Abdoun Basin (Morocco)

The Oulad Abdoun Basin (also known as the Ouled Abdoun Basin or Khouribga Basin) is a phosphate sedimentary basin located in Morocco, near the city of Khouribga. It is the largest in Morocco, comprising 44% of Morocco's phosphate reserves, and at least 26.8 billion tons of phosphate. It is also known as an important site for vertebrate fossils, with deposits ranging from the Late Cretaceous (Maastrichtian) to the Eocene epoch (Ypresian), a period of about 25 million years.

== Geography ==
The Oulad Abdoun is located west of the Atlas Mountains, near the city of Khouribga. The Oulad Abdoun phosphate deposits encompass some 100 by 45 kilometres (62 by 28 mi), an area of 4,500 square kilometres (1,700 sq mi). The Oulad Abdoun is the largest and northernmost of Morocco's major phosphate basins, which from northeast to southwest, include the Ganntour, Meskala, and Oued Eddahab (Laayoune-Baa) basins.

== Paleobiota ==
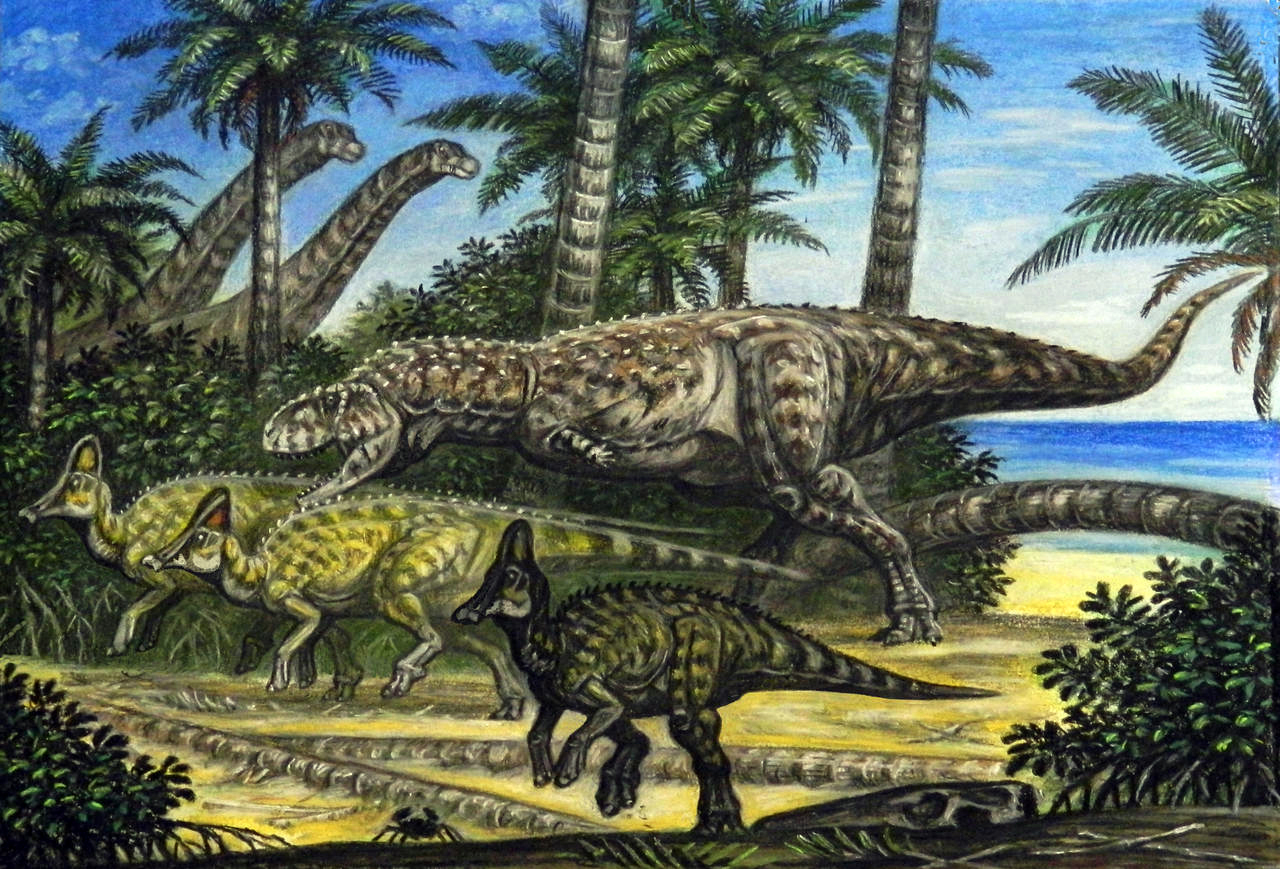
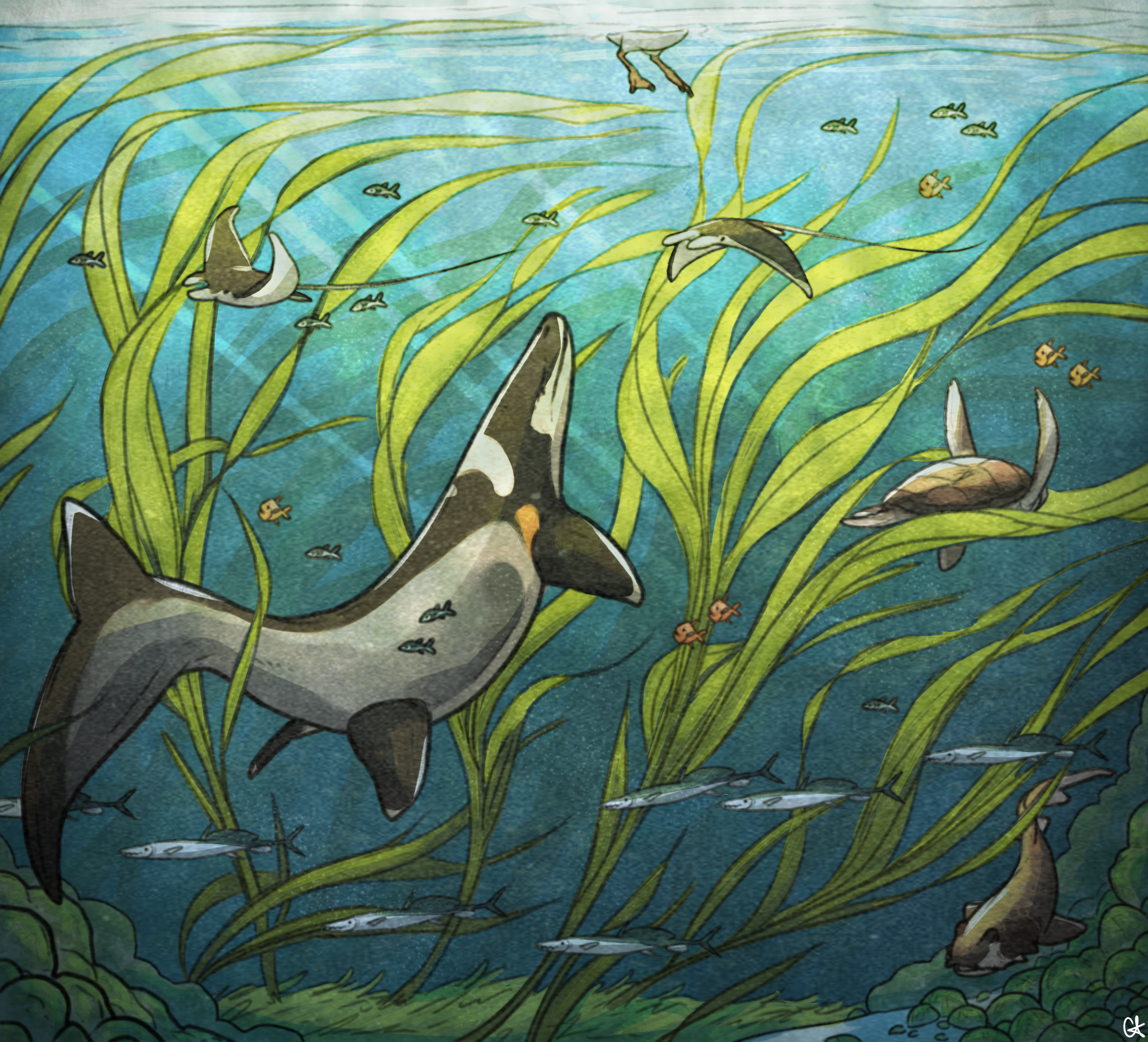
Life restoration of Ouled Abdoun Basin paleoenvironments during the late Cretaceous: dinosaurs of Sidi Chennane (left) and numerous aquatic animals of Sidi Daoui (right).

Color key: Taxon / Reclassified taxon / Taxon falsely reported as present / Dubious taxon or junior synonym / Ichnotaxon / Ootaxon / Morphotaxon

Notes
Uncertain or tentative taxa are in small text
~~crossed out~~ taxa are discredited. The Oulad Abdoun Basin stretches from the late Cretaceous to the Eocene and contains abundant marine vertebrate fossils, including sharks, bony fish, turtles, crocodilians, and other reptiles, as well as sea birds and a small number of terrestrial mammals.

=== Molluscs ===
Mollusca from the Khouribga Phosphates
Genus	Species	Location	Time	Material	Notes	Images
Cucullaea (Idonearca)	C. (I.) thevestensis				A false ark shell.	
Heligmopsis	H. wegmanianus		Maastrichtian		A feather oyster also present in Ganntour basin.	
Venericardia	V. coquandi		Danian		A carditid clam also present in Ganntour basin.	
Baculites	B. sp.		Maastrichtian		A straight-shelled ammonite, also present in Ganntour basin.	
Cimomia	C. aff. sudanensis		Ypresian		A nautiloid also present in Ganntour basin.	
Ampullinopsis	A. crassatina				An ampullinid gastropod.	
Hemithersitea	H. chouberti		Lutetian		A thersiteid gastropod.	

=== Fish ===
==== Bony fish ====
Bony fish from the Khouribga Phosphates
Genus	Species	Location	Time	Material	Notes	Images
Acipenseridae	Indeterminate		Maastrichtian		First record of a sturgeon on the continent of Africa.	
Enchodus	E. libycus		Maastrichtian		An enchodontid aulopiform.	
Enchodus	E. bursauxi		Maastrichtian		An enchodontid aulopiform.	
Enchodus	E. elegans		Maastrichtian		An enchodontid aulopiform.	
Eoserrasalmimus	E. cattoi		Maastrichtian		A pycnodontiform.	
Mawsoniidae	Indeterminate		Maastrichtian		A giant mawsoniid coelacanth measuring 3.65–5.52 metres (12.0–18.1 ft) long.	
Phacodus	P. punctatus var. africanus		Maastrichtian		A pycnodontiform.	
Plethodidae	Indeterminate		Maastrichtian		Youngest occurrence of plethodid fish.	
Protarpon	P. boualii		Danian		A tarpon	
Pycnodontidae	Indeterminate		Maastrichtian			
Pseudoegertonia	P. sp.		Maastrichtian			
Serrasalmimus	S. secans		Thanetian		A carnivorous pycnodontiform.	
Stephanodus	S. libycus		Maastrichtian		A pycnodontid	
Stratodus	S. apicalis		Maastrichtian		An alepisauroform.	
Macroprosopon	M. hiltoni		Ypresian		A marine osteoglossid.	

==== Sharks ====
Sharks from the Khouribga Phosphates
Genus	Species	Location	Time	Material	Notes	Images
Abdounia	A. africana		Selandian		A requiem shark.	
Brachycarcharias	B. atlasi		Ypresian			
Casieria	C. maghrebiana		Selandian			
Chiloscyllium	C. salvani.		Selandian		A carpet shark.	
Cretalamna	C. appendiculata		Maastrichtian		An otodontid shark	
Cretalamna	C. maroccana		Maastrichtian		An otodontid shark	
Delpitoscyllium	D. africanum		Selandian			
Eostegostoma	E. sp.		Selandian		A carpet shark.	
Foumtizia	F. abdouni		Selandian			
Galeorhinus	G. mesetaensis		Selandian		A houndshark	
Ginglymostoma	G. chenanei		Selandian		An early relative of nurse shark	
Ginglymostoma	G. khouribgaense		Selandian		An early relative of nurse shark	
Hologinglymostoma	H. jaegeri		Selandian			
Khouribgaleus	K. gomphorhiza		Selandian			
Metlaouia	M. delpiti		Selandian			
Microscyliorhinus	M. simplex		Selandian			
Palaeogaleus	P. larachei		Selandian			
Palaeorhincodon	P. daouii		Selandian		A carpet shark.	
Porodermoides	P. spanios		Selandian			
Premontreia	P. peypouqueti		Selandian			
Premontreia	P. subulidens		Selandian			
Pseudocorax	P. heteroserratus		Maastrichtian		A pseudocoracid mackerel shark	
Scyliorhinus	S. ptychtus		Selandian		A catshark	
Scyliorhinus	S. entomodon		Selandian		A catshark	
Scyliorhinus	S. sulcidens		Selandian		A catshark	
Serratolamna	S. serrata		Maastrichtian		A mackerel shark	
Serratolamna	S. khderii		Maastrichtian		A mackerel shark	
Squalicorax	S. pristodontus		Maastrichtian		A crow shark	
Squalicorax	S. bassanii		Maastrichtian		A crow shark	
Squalicorax	S. africanus		Maastrichtian		A crow shark	
Squalicorax	S. microserratus		Maastrichtian		A crow shark	
Squalicorax	S. benguerirensis		Maastrichtian		A crow shark	
Triakis	T. antunesi		Selandian		A houndshark	

==== Other cartilaginous fish ====
Other cartilaginous fish from the Khouribga Phosphates
Genus	Species	Location	Time	Material	Notes	Images
Archaemanta	A. priemi		Selandian		A ray.	
Burnhamia	B. cf. davisi		Selandian		A devil ray	
Coupatezia	C. larivei		Selandian		A ray.	
Coupatezia	C. fallax		Maastrichtian		A ray.	
Coupatezia	C. elevata		Maastrichtian		A ray.	
Dasyatis	D. ponsi		Selandian		A stingray. An indeterminate species found in Maastrichtian deposits of Ganntour Basin.	
Delpitia	D. reticulata		Selandian		A ray.	
Gymnura	G. delpiti		Selandian		A ray.	
Heterobatis	H. talbaouii		Selandian		A ray.	
Heterotorpedo	H. brahimi		Selandian		A ray.	
Hypolophodon	H. sp.		Selandian		A ray.	
Rhombodus	R. binkhorsti		Maastrichtian		A ray.	
Rhombodus	R. microdus		Maastrichtian		A ray.	
Rhombodus	R. meridionalis		Maastrichtian		A ray.	
Schizorhiza	S. stromeri		Maastrichtian		A sclerorhynchoid skate which resembled a sawfish.	

=== Dinosaurs ===
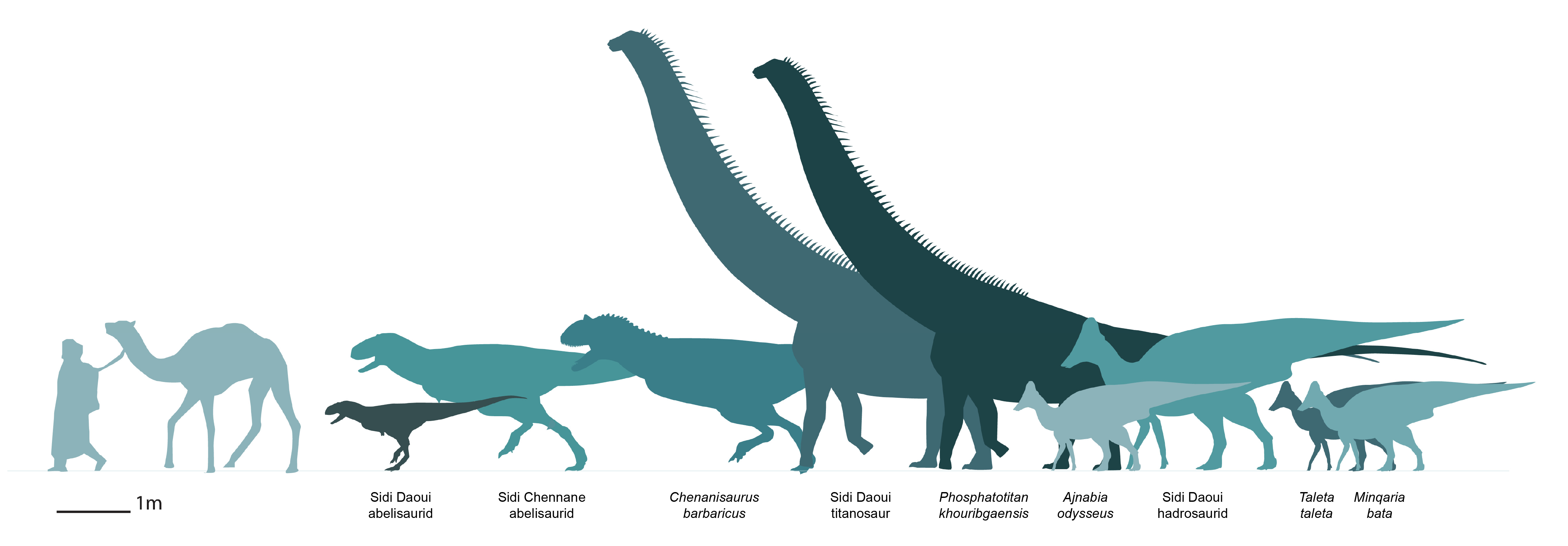
Late Maastrichtian dinosaurs of Ouled Abdoun Basin, including Chenanisaurus, Phosphatotitan, Ajnabia, Taleta, Minqaria, and several unnamed specimens

==== Ornithischians ====
Ornithischians from the Khouribga Phosphates
Genus	Species	Location	Time	Material	Notes	Images
Ajnabia	A. odysseus	Office Cherifien des Phosphates mines at Sidi Chennane	Maastrichtian	partial left maxilla with teeth; fragments of right maxilla; partial right dentary	A small lambeosaurine hadrosaur; the first known from Africa	
Lambeosaurinae	Indeterminate	Mrah Lahrach	Maastrichtian	right femur	A lambeosaurine larger than Ajnabia and Minqaria	
Lambeosaurinae	Indeterminate	Sidi Daoui	Maastrichtian	left humerus	A lambeosaurine larger than Ajnabia and Minqaria	
Minqaria	M. bata	Sidi Chennane	Maastrichtian	right maxilla; left dentary; braincase	A lambeosaurine hadrosaur	
Taleta	T. taleta	Sidi Chennane	Maastrichtian	partial left and right maxilla with teeth	A lambeosaurine hadrosaur	

==== Sauropods ====
Sauropods from the Khouribga Phosphates
Genus	Species	Location	Time	Material	Notes	Images
Phosphatotitan	P. khouribgaensis	Sidi Chennane	Maastrichtian	pelvis, caudal vertebrae, dorsal vertebrae, and sacral vertebrae.	First named titanosaur from this region.	
Titanosauria	Indeterminate	Sidi Daoui	Maastrichtian	right femur, tibia, and fibula; undescribed material	An unnamed titanosaurian taxon with affinities to argentinosaurids, possibly slightly larger than Phosphatotitan.	

==== Theropods ====
===== Abelisaurs =====
Abelisaurs from the Khouribga Phosphates
Genus	Species	Location	Time	Material	Notes	Images
Abelisauridae	Indeterminate	Sidi Chennane	Maastrichtian	right tibia	Probably distinct from Chenanisaurus due to its smaller size (about 5 m (16 ft) long) despite being mature. Similar to South American abelisaurids. Possibly a member of Furileusauria.	Chenanisaurus
Abelisauridae	Indeterminate	Sidi Daoui	Maastrichtian	right metatarsal II	A mature specimen but very small for an abelisaurid, about 2.6 m (8.5 ft) long	Chenanisaurus
Chenanisaurus	C. barbaricus	Sidi Chennane; Sidi Daoui	Maastrichtian	anterior end of left dentary; 2 premaxillary teeth; a maxillary tooth	A large abelisaurid theropod.	Chenanisaurus

===== Birds =====
Bird fossils are common in the Basin, which includes the oldest birds in Africa. At least three orders and several families of sea birds are represented, including Procellariiformes (albatrosses and petrels, fossils assignable to Diomedeidae and Procellariidae), Pelecaniformes (pelicans and allies, fossils assignable to Phaethontidae, Prophaethontidae, Fregatidae and Pelagornithidae), and Anseriformes (waterfowl, including fossil Presbyornithidae).

Birds from the Khouribga Phosphates
Genus	Species	Location	Time	Material	Notes	Images
Dasornis	D. abdoun	Sidi Daoui	Ypresian	A holotype specimens consists of carpometacarpus, ulna, radius, tibiotarsus, and humerus.	A pelagornithid, or pseudotooth bird.	
Dasornis	D. emuinus	Sidi Daoui	Ypresian	A partial skeleton with incomplete cranium.	A pelagornithid, or pseudotooth bird.	
Dasornis	D. tolapica		Selandian	A parital skeleton.	A pelagornithid, or pseudotooth bird.	
Lithoptila	L. abdounensis	Sidi Daoui	Thanetian	A neurocranium.	A prophaethontid seabird related to modern tropicbirds.	

=== Pterosaurs ===
Pterosaurs from the Khouribga Phosphates
Genus	Species	Location	Time	Material	Notes	Images
Alcione	A. elainus	Sidi Daoui	Maastrichtian		A nyctosaurid which shows possible adaptations towards diving behaviour.	
Barbaridactylus	B. grandis	Sidi Daoui	Maastrichtian		A nyctosaurid.	Barbaridactylus
Simurghia	S. robusta	Sidi Daoui	Maastrichtian		A nyctosaurid related to Alcione.	
Phosphatodraco	P. mauritanicus	Sidi Daoui	Maastrichtian		An azhdarchid.	
Arambourgiania?	Indeterminate	Sidi Chennane	Maastrichtian		A giant azhdarchid, may belong to the Jordanian taxon Arambourgiania.	
aff. Quetzalcoatlus	Indeterminate		Maastrichtian			
Tethydraco	T. regalis	Sidi Daoui	Maastrichtian		A pterosaur of debated affinity; may be an azhdarchid or a pteranodontid.	

=== Crocodylomorphs ===
Crocodylomorphs from the Khouribga Phosphates
Genus	Species	Location	Time	Material	Notes	Images
Arambourgisuchus	A. khouribgaensis		Thanetian		A dyrosaurid.	
Atlantosuchus	A. coupatezi		Danian		A dyrosaurid.	
Chenanisuchus	C. lateroculi		Thanetian		The most basal known dyrosaurid.	
Dyrosaurus	D. maghribensis		Ypresian		A dyrosaur.	
Maroccosuchus	M. zennaroi		Ypresian		A tomistomine crocodylian.	
Ocepesuchus	O. eoafricanus		Maastrichtian		A gavialoid crocodylian.	

=== Squamates ===
==== Mosasaurs ====
The late Maastrichtian deposits of the Khouribga Phosphates preserve abundant mosasaur fossils, especially isolated teeth. At least fifteen species are represented, covering the majority of ecological niches the group is known to have occupied. The Ouled Abdoun Basin is one of the richest known mosasaur fossil sites in the world.

Mosasaurs from the Khouribga Phosphates
Genus	Species	Location	Time	Material	Notes	Images
Carinodens	C. acrodon		Maastrichtian	Dentaries; Isolated teeth	A small mosasaurine mosasaur with crushing teeth. Fossils of all reported Carinodens species are very rare in Khouribga. The dentition differs slightly between species, suggesting marginally different diets. More fossil material is required to determine if both C. minalmamar and C. belgicus are present in the Khouribga Phosphates, as the present material is difficult to differentiate.	
Carinodens	C. belgicus		Maastrichtian	Dentaries; Isolated teeth	A small mosasaurine mosasaur with crushing teeth. Fossils of all reported Carinodens species are very rare in Khouribga. The dentition differs slightly between species, suggesting marginally different diets. More fossil material is required to determine if both C. minalmamar and C. belgicus are present in the Khouribga Phosphates, as the present material is difficult to differentiate.	
Carinodens	C. minalmamar		Maastrichtian	Dentaries; Isolated teeth	A small mosasaurine mosasaur with crushing teeth. Fossils of all reported Carinodens species are very rare in Khouribga. The dentition differs slightly between species, suggesting marginally different diets. More fossil material is required to determine if both C. minalmamar and C. belgicus are present in the Khouribga Phosphates, as the present material is difficult to differentiate.	
Eremiasaurus	E. heterodontus		Maastrichtian	Partial and subcomplete skeletons; Isolated teeth	A mosasaurine mosasaur with unusually heterodont teeth, including straight and conical anterior teeth, blade-like median teeth, and recurved posterior teeth. A medium-sized (4.5–5 metres) predator and one of the more commonly found fossil mosasaurs in the Khouribga Phosphates.	
Gavialimimus	G. almaghribensis		Maastrichtian	A complete skull; Isolated teeth	An unusual longirostrine plioplatecarpine mosasaur, measuring about 6 metres long. Fossils of G. almaghribensis are very common in the Khouribga Phosphates.	
Globidens	G. phosphaticus		Maastrichtian	Isolated teeth	A durophagous mosasaurine mosasaur with specialized crushing teeth. G. phosphaticus is known from Morocco only in the form of isolated teeth but more complete material from the species is known from Angola. G. phosphaticus and G. simplex were of similar size but had slightly different teeth, suggesting marginally different diets.	
Globidens	G. simplex		Maastrichtian	A partial skull; Isolated teeth	A durophagous mosasaurine mosasaur with specialized crushing teeth. G. phosphaticus is known from Morocco only in the form of isolated teeth but more complete material from the species is known from Angola. G. phosphaticus and G. simplex were of similar size but had slightly different teeth, suggesting marginally different diets.	
Halisaurus	H. arambourgi		Maastrichtian	Several skeletons; Isolated teeth	A halisaurine mosasaur, measuring about 3–4 metres long. One of the most commonly found mosasaurs in Morocco.	
Igdamanosaurus	I. aegyptiacus		Maastrichtian		"Globidens aegyptiacus" was previously reported as present in the Khouribga Phosphates on the basis of isolated teeth. G. aegyptiacus was reclassified as Igdamanosaurus aegyptiacus in 1991 and differs from the globidensin material known from Morocco. Moroccan fossils previously referred to G. aegyptiacus are now referred to G. phosphaticus.	
Khinjaria	K. acuta	Sidi Chennane	Maastrichtian	A partial skull and vertebra	A plioplatecarpine mosasaur, known only from a single specimen. Khinjaria possessed a unique skull and teeth morphology and might have been an ambush predator.	
Liodon	L. anceps		Maastrichtian		"Mosasaurus (Leiodon) cf. anceps" was reported as present in Khouribga by Camille Arambourg (1952) based on isolated teeth. Liodon anceps is now considered a nomen dubium. Teeth previously referred to Liodon likely belong to Eremiasaurus heterodontus (small and slender specimens) and Thalassotitan atrox (other specimens).	
Mosasaurus	M. beaugei		Maastrichtian	Skulls and mandibles; Isolated teeth	A large mosasaurine mosasaur, measuring about 8–10 metres long. Relatively scarce compared to other mosasaurs of comparable size. Likely a local apex predator.	
Platecarpus	P. ptychodon		Maastrichtian	Isolated teeth and vertebrae	Platecarpus ptychodon is known only from isolated material. The fossils referred to P. ptychodon are treated either as non-diagnostic (in which case P. ptychodon is a nomen dubium) or as belonging to Gavialimimus almaghribensis (in which case G. almaghribensis is considered a junior synonym of the new combination Gavialimimus ptychodon).	
Pluridens	P. serpentis		Maastrichtian	Complete skulls with associated vertebrae; Isolated teeth	A large halisaurine mosasaur, also known from Niger and Nigeria. Measured about 5–6 metres long. Pluridens is relatively uncommon in Morocco and distinguished from the closely related Halisaurus based on features in the skull and its larger size. The teeth of Pluridens are identical to those of Halisaurus, only larger, and the two are thus difficult to differentiate in samples of isolated teeth.	
Pluridens	P. imelaki		Maastrichtian	Skull and mandibles	A large halisaurine mosasaur, also known from Niger and Nigeria. Measured about 5–6 metres long. Pluridens is relatively uncommon in Morocco and distinguished from the closely related Halisaurus based on features in the skull and its larger size. The teeth of Pluridens are identical to those of Halisaurus, only larger, and the two are thus difficult to differentiate in samples of isolated teeth.	
Prognathodon	P. currii		Maastrichtian	Isolated teeth	A large mosasaurine mosasaur. Prognathodon curii is known in Morocco only from isolated teeth and is comparably rare, with only about a dozen teeth identified. The related species Prognathodon giganteus is also known from Morocco, though only from earlier lower Maastrichtian deposits in the Ganntour Basin to the southwest of the Ouled Abdoun Basin.	
Stelladens	S. mysteriosus		Maastrichtian	A dentary fragment; Isolated teeth	A medium-sized mosasaurine with distinct, unique teeth structure with prominent serrated ridges. Stelladens is a very scarce taxon in the Khouribga Phosphates. Stelladens would have measured about 5 metres long and was probably a highly specialized predator.	
Thalassotitan	T. atrox		Maastrichtian	Several skeletons; Isolated teeth	A large-bodied mosasaurine with powerful jaws and massive teeth, closely related to Prognathodon. Fossils of Thalassotitan are comparably very common and it likely represented the largest local apex predator. Fossils now referred to Thalassotitan were before its description often referred to as "Prognathodon nov. sp."	
Xenodens	X. calminechari		Maastrichtian	A left maxilla with four teeth; A left maxilla with eight teeth	A small mosasaurine mosasaur with unusual, shark-like teeth. The holotype of Xenodons was suggested to potentially be a forged specimen by Sharpe et al. (2024), but Longrich et al. (2025) published a rebuttal based on CT scans of the holotype and another referred specimen, arguing for the validity of the genus.	

==== Snakes ====
Snakes from the Khouribga Phosphates
Genus	Species	Location	Time	Material	Notes	Images
Palaeophis	P. maghrebianus		Maastrichtian?–Ypresian	Multiple fossilized vertebrae.	A palaeophiid marine snake.	

==== Varanoids ====
Varanoids from the Khouribga Phosphates
Genus	Species	Location	Time	Material	Notes	Images
Pachyvaranus	P. crassispondylus		Maastrichtian	Vertebrae and ribs	A near-shore marine lizard. Originally described based only on a small number of isolated vertebrae. Discovery of further vertebrae and ribs in Morocco and Syria allowed in 2011 for classification in the Varanoidea, in a new family Pachyvaranidae. Osteoderms were originally referred to this taxon but likely come from fish instead, perhaps Stratodus.	

=== Plesiosaurs ===
Plesiosaur material found in the Ouled Abdoun Basin has been referred to one valid species, Zarafasaura oceanis. Isolated elasmosaurid fossils may all belong to this species but comparison is difficult.

Plesiosaurs from the Khouribga Phosphates
Genus	Species	Location	Time	Material	Notes	Images
Elasmosauridae	indet.	Sidi Daoui	Maastrichtian	Articulated and isolated vertebrae; Pelvic elements	Elasmosaurid fossils without cranial elements. Could represent the same taxon as Zarafasaura oceanis but comparison impossible at the time of discovery due to no overlap in the fossil material. Comparison may be possible after the discovery of postcranial Zarafasaura elements in 2013.	
Plesiosaurus	P. mauritanicus		Maastrichtian	Isolated teeth and vertebrae	Named by Camille Arambourg (1952) based on isolated fossils. Plesiosaurus mauritanicus is regarded as a nomen dubium since the fossils are non-diagnostic beyond being elasmosaurid, and because the holotype and paratypes are from different individuals found at different localities. Potentially the same taxon as Zarafasaura oceanis.	
Zarafasaura	Z. oceanis	Sidi Daoui	Maastrichtian	Holotype specimen, a crushed skull and partial mandible; Paratype specimen, complete skull with many postcranial elements	A relatively small elasmosaurid plesiosaur, closely related to plesiosaurs known from North America and Japan.	

=== Turtles ===
Turtles from the Khouribga Phosphates
Genus	Species	Location	Time	Material	Notes	Images
Alienochelys	A. selloumi	Sidi Daoui	Maastrichtian		A sea turtle with crushing jaws	
Araiochelys	A. hirayamai	Sidi Daoui	Maastrichtian	A skull, lower jaws, partial disarticulated shell, including a few carapace fragments (left first and fifth costals, left third, seventh, and eighth peripherals and other fragments), nearly complete plastron, and limb bones.	A bothremydid pleurodiran turtle	
Argillochelys	A. africana		Ypresian		A pancheloniid sea turtle	
Bothremys	B. kellyi		Danian-Thanetian		A bothremydid pleurodiran turtle	
Bothremys	B. maghrebiana		Danian-Thanetian		A bothremydid pleurodiran turtle	
Brachyopsemys	B. tingitana		Danian		A sandownid sea turtle	
Euclastes	E. acutirostris		Danian-Thanetian		A pancheloniid sea turtle. An indeterminate species also present in the Maastrichtian deposits of Ganntour Basin.	
Euclastes	E. wielandi		Danian		A pancheloniid sea turtle. An indeterminate species also present in the Maastrichtian deposits of Ganntour Basin.	
Labrostochelys	L. galkini	Oued Zem	Danian	A nearly complete skull	A bothremydid pleurodiran turtle	
Marocokatognathus	M. jimenezi	near Oued Zem	Thanetian–Ypresian	A partial mandible	A cheloniid sea turtle	
Ocepechelon	O. bouyai	Sidi Chennane	Maastrichtian	A complete but isolated 70-cm-long skull.	A giant protostegid sea turtle with an unusual pipette-like snout	
Puppigerus	P. camperi		Ypresian		A Pancheloniid sea turtle	
Rhothonemys	R. brinkmani		Danian		A bothremydid pleurodiran turtle	
Tasbacka	T. ouledabdounensis		Danian		A cheloniid sea turtle	
Taphrosphys	T. ippolitoi		Danian		A bothremydid pleurodiran turtle	
Ummulisani	U. rutgersensis	Mrah Iaresh	Ypresian	A skull without a palate	A bothremydid pleurodiran turtle	

=== Mammals ===
==== Afrotheres ====
Afrotheres from the Khouribga Phosphates
Genus	Species	Location	Time	Material	Notes	Images
Abdounodus	A. hamdii		Thanetian-Ypresian	A lower jaw.	An early afrotherian mammal.	
Daouitherium	D. rebouli		Ypresian	lower jaws and associated cheek teeth	An early proboscidean.	
Eritherium	E. azzouzorum	Sidi Chennane	Thanetian	An upper jaw (with approaches of the zygomatic bone and two maxillary branches, each of the two posterior premolars (P3 and 4) and three molars (M1-3))	An early proboscidean.	
Hadrogeneios	H. phosphaticus		Selandian-Thanetian	A mandibular symphysis with some partial left dentary, two sockets for the incisors, the first lower canine, and the first to third premolars	An early afrotherian mammal.	
Ocepeia	O. daouiensis	Grand Daoui, Meraa El Arech, and Sidi Chennane	Selandian	Partial skull consists of an upper jaw and dental fragments	An early afrotherian mammal.	
Ocepeia	O. grandis	Grand Daoui, Meraa El Arech, and Sidi Chennane	Thanetian	Lower jaw and teeth.	An early afrotherian mammal.	
Phosphatherium	P. escuilliei		Selandian		An early proboscidean.	
Stylolophus	S. minor		Ypresian		An embrithopod.	
Stylolophus	S. major		Ypresian		An embrithopod.	

==== Hyaenodonts ====
Hyaenodonts from the Khouribga Phosphates
Genus	Species	Location	Time	Material	Notes	Images
Boualitomus	B. marocanensis		Selandian		A hyaenodont.	
Lahimia	L. selloumi		Selandian		A hyaenodont.	

== See also ==
- Cretaceous–Paleogene extinction event
- Fauna of Africa
- List of dinosaur bearing rock formations
