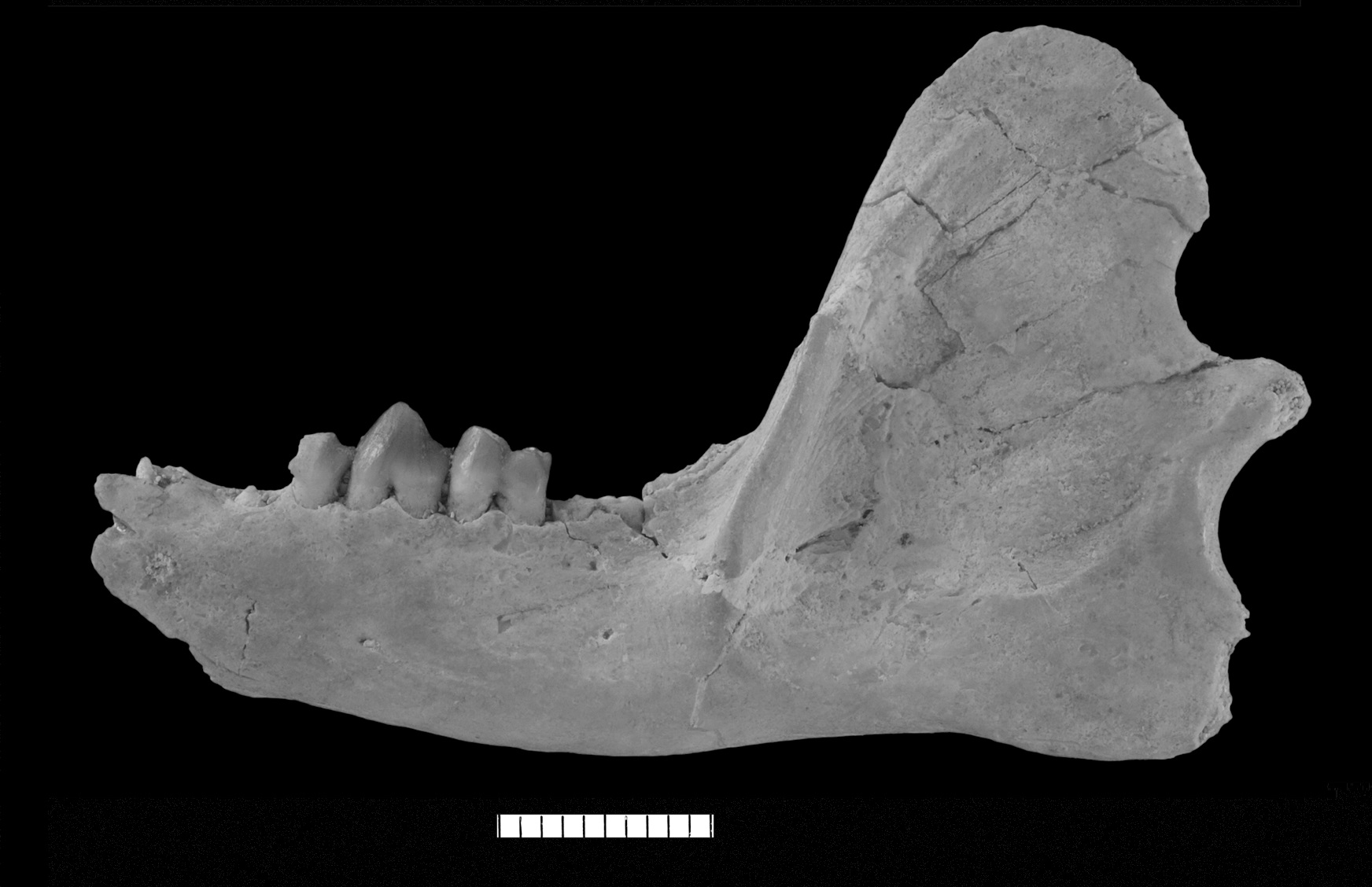
- A. hamdii lower jaw

Scientific classification
- Kingdom: Animalia
- Phylum: Chordata
- Class: Mammalia
- Infraclass: Placentalia
- Superorder: Afrotheria
- Clade: Paenungulatomorpha
- Genus: †Abdounodus; Gheerbrant & Sudre, 2001
- Species: †A. hamdii

Binomial name
- †Abdounodus hamdii Gheerbrant et al., 2001

= Abdounodus =

Abdounodus Temporal range: Paleocene 61–59 Ma

Extinct genus of mammal

Abdounodus ("Abdoun tooth") is an extinct genus of mammal known from the middle Paleocene of Northern Africa. The sole species, A. hamdii, is known from teeth and jaw bones discovered in the Ouled Abdoun Basin of present-day Morocco in 2001.

== Discovery and naming ==
Discovery

The holotype (MNHN PM21) of Abdounodus hamdii was collected in French fossil markets. It consists of a left mandible and teeth. A study in 2016 described new material that included the maxillary and upper dentition.

Naming

The generic name combines Abdoun referring to the place of origin and odus meaning tooth. The specific name hamdii is named after M. Mohamed Hamdi, who was an active supporter for paleontological research in the region.

== Description ==
Abdounodus has dentition similar of that mioclaenids, but is differentiated by features such as the talonid being short and narrow, the posfossid being weakly excavated, the entoconid being quite large, lack of cingula, and a small and a inflated hypocounlid. The upper molars are noticeably bunodont with an inflated crown and bulbous cusps, and have 3 roots. There also features that support a meatconule-dervived pseudohypocone such as a absence of other conules aside from the metaconule-pseudohypocone.

== Classification ==
In a study in 2016 it was classified as a basal afrothere. It was hypothesized that Abdounodus and Ocepeia are transitional lophodont stem paenugulates. In the same study the authors erected a new clade called Paenungulatomorpha.

- †Hadrogeneios
- - †Ocepeia
  - - †Abdounodus
    - - Paenungulata
        - Hyracoidea
        - - †Embrithopoda
          - - Tethytheria
              - Sirenia
              - Proboscidea

== Paleobiology ==
Diet

Abdounodus would've likely ate hard and abrasive plants as its jaw and tooth remains show it would've likely had a strong crushing motion.
