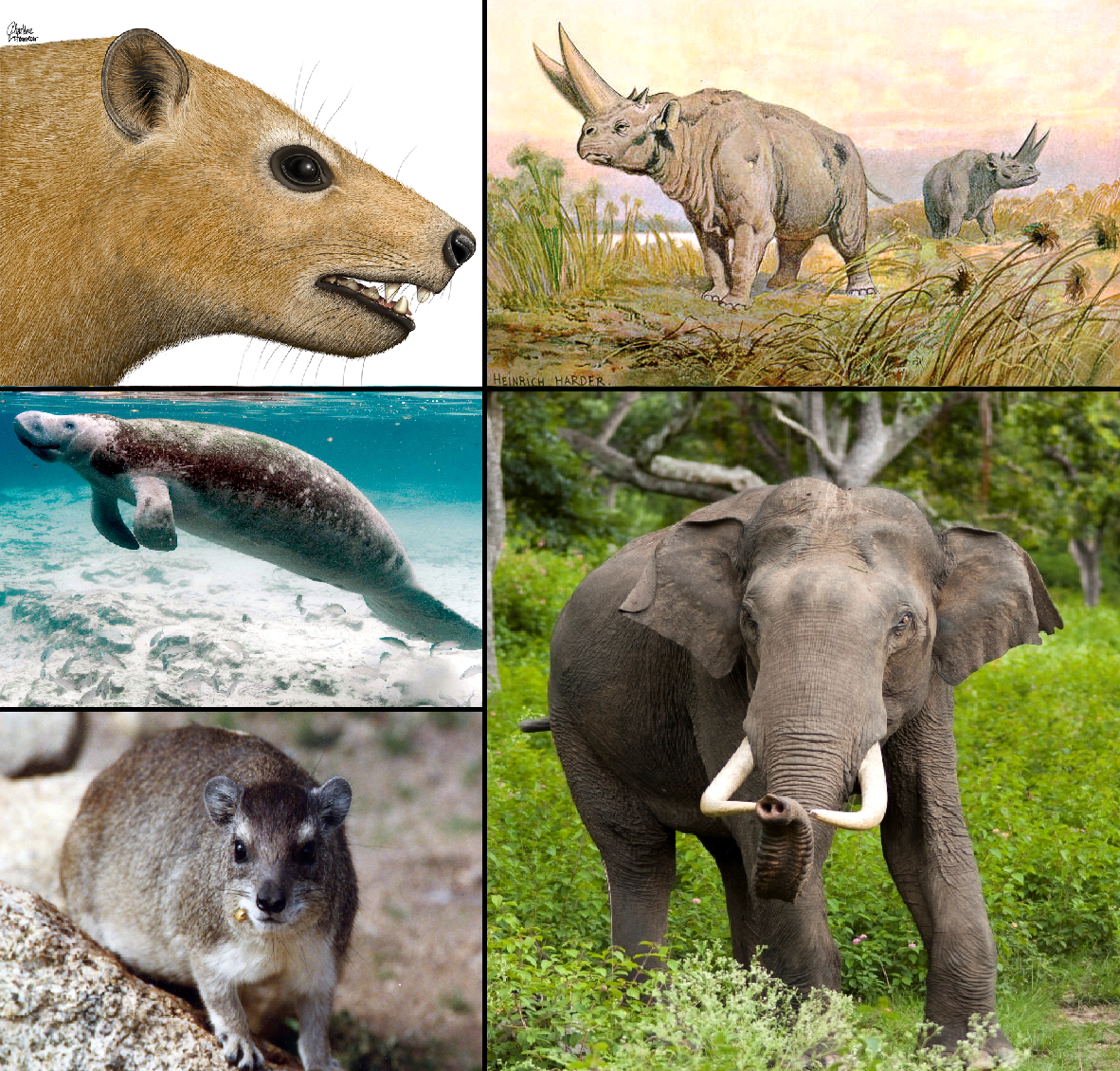
- Crowned paenungulates and Ocepeia

Scientific classification
- Kingdom: Animalia
- Phylum: Chordata
- Class: Mammalia
- Infraclass: Placentalia
- Superorder: Afrotheria
- Clade: Paenungulatomorpha; Gheerbrant, 2016

Subgroups
- †Hadrogeneios; †Ocepeia; †Abdounodus; Paenungulata

= Paenungulatomorpha =

Paenungulatomorpha Temporal range: Paleocene - Recent, 61–0 Ma

Clade of mammals

Paenungulatomorpha is a clade of afrotherian mammals that can be characterized according to Gheerbrant et al. (2016):

by a mandibular retromolar fossa, the absence of hypocone, an ectoloph selenodont and linked to strong styles such as mesostyle in basal taxa, and a more or less developed pseudohypocone.

Originally it was thought paenungulates were closely related to the perissodactyls in the clade Altungulata due to shared attributes in the dental, osteological and soft-tissues. However this view was contested as molecular studies have widely supported that paenungulates are not related to the perissodactyls, instead more related to the widely different clade Afroinsectiphilia, with them forming the clade Afrotheria. There has been also some morphological data to support Afrotheria, though the paleontological record to support was lacking until reexamination of the genera Ocepeia and Abdounodus, as well as the description of the basal Hadrogeneios in 2023 has shown not only fossil evidence for the inclusion of paenungulates as afrotherians but also any morphological similarities between paenungulates and perissodactyls is due to convergence.

Below is a cladogram from Gheerbrant (2023):

- Paenungulatomorpha
  - †Hadrogeneios
  - - †Ocepeia
    - - †Abdounodus
      - - Paenungulata
          - Hyracoidea
          - - †Embrithopoda
            - - Tethytheria
                - Sirenia
                - Proboscidea
