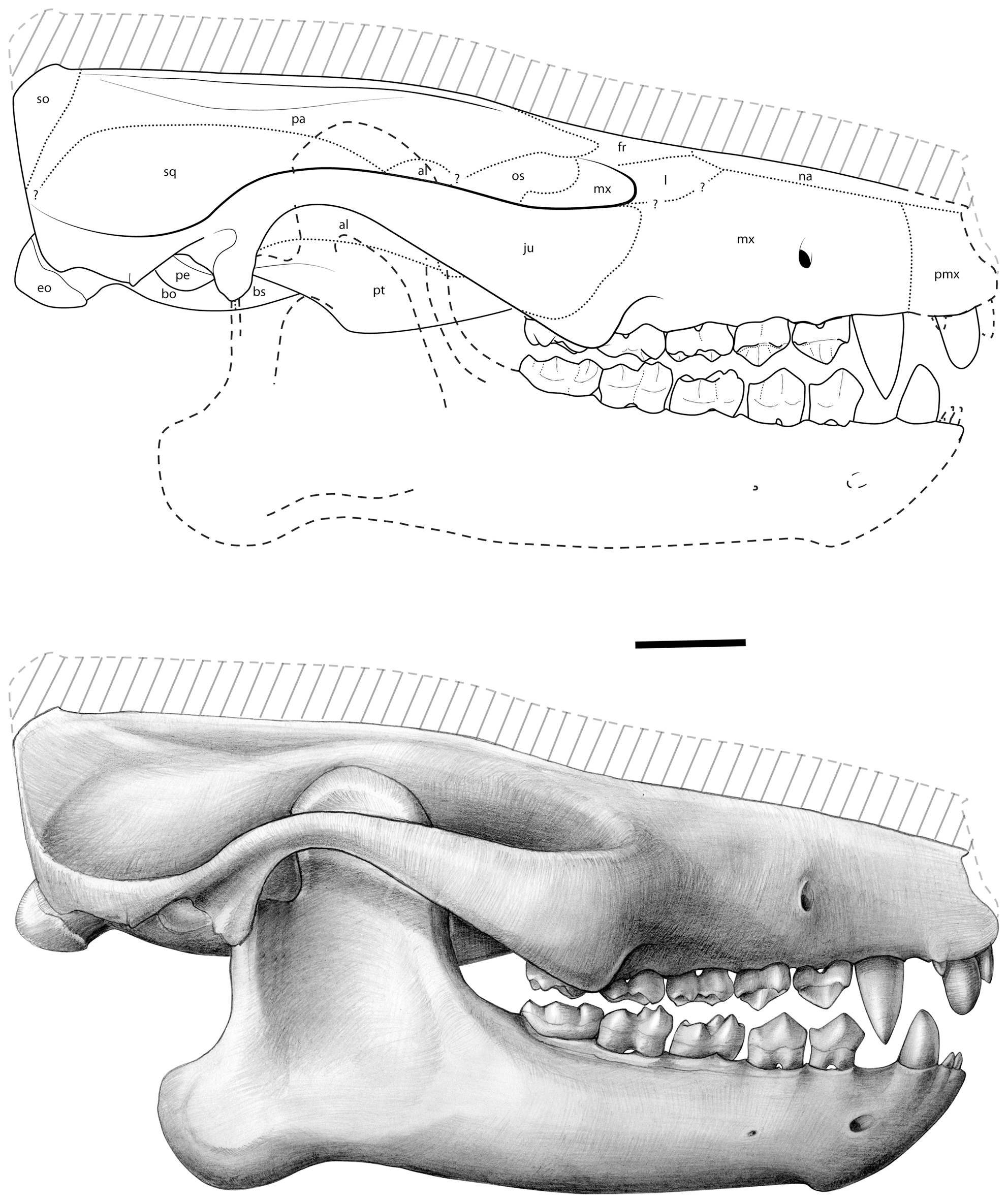
- Ocepeia daouiensis skull restoration

Scientific classification
- Kingdom: Animalia
- Phylum: Chordata
- Class: Mammalia
- Magnorder: Atlantogenata
- Superorder: Afrotheria
- Clade: Paenungulatomorpha
- Family: †Ocepeiidae; Gheerbrant, 2014
- Genus: †Ocepeia; Gheerbrant & Sudre, 2001

Type species
- Ocepeia daouiensis Gheerbrant & Sudre, 2001

Species
- O. daouiensis Gheerbrant & Sudre, 2001; O. grandis Gheerbrant, 2014

= Ocepeia =

Ocepeia Temporal range: Paleocene, 61–57 Ma

Extinct Afrotherian mammal

Ocepeia is an extinct genus of afrotherian mammal that lived in present-day Morocco during the middle Paleocene epoch, approximately 60 million years ago. First named and described in 2001, the type species is O. daouiensis from the Selandian stage of Morocco's Ouled Abdoun Basin. A second, larger species, O. grandis, is known from the Thanetian, a slightly younger stage in the same area. In life, the two species are estimated to have weighed about 3.5 kg (7.7 lb) and 10 kg (22 lb), respectively, and are believed to have been specialized leaf-eaters. The fossil skulls of Ocepeia are the oldest known afrotherian skulls, and the best-known of any Paleocene mammal in Africa.

Ocepeia was initially grouped with the archaic ungulates known as "condylarths", but Ocepeia shares several features with primitive paenungulates (a group including elephants, hyraxes, sea cows and extinct relatives), but some analyses suggest it is more closely related to Afroinsectiphilia (a group containing aardvarks, golden moles, and tenrecs). As such, it may represent a transitional stage in the evolution of paenungulates from insectivore-like mammals. Unusual features of Ocepeia include skull bones with many air-spaces, and teeth and jaws reminiscent of those of simian primates. Ocepeia is distinct enough from other groups that it is placed in its own family, Ocepeiidae.

Ocepeia lived at a time when northwest Africa was at the intersection of the Atlantic Ocean and the ancient Tethys Ocean, and much of the area was flooded by shallow, warm inland seas. Ocepeia fossils are associated with diverse sharks, birds, and marine reptiles, and a small number of early mammals, including other condylarths and early proboscideans. The early appearance and specialized features of Ocepeia suggest afrotherians originated and diversified within Africa, contrary to theories suggesting a more northern origin.

== Discovery and naming ==
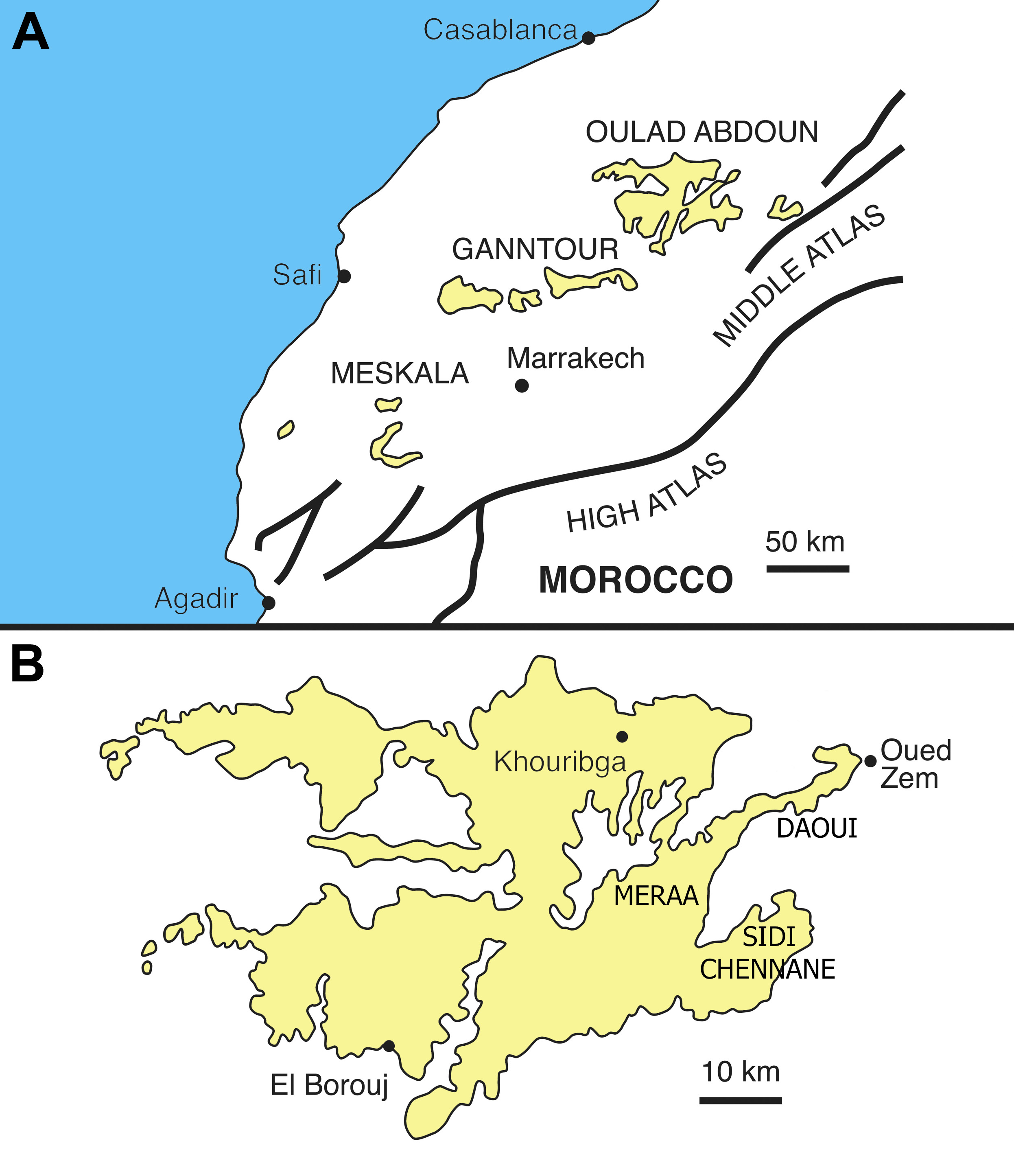
The Ouled Abdoun Basin and other major phosphate basins of Morocco (A) and key fossil localities of the Ouled Abdoun (B): Grand Daoui, Meraa El Arech, and Sidi Chennane

All specimens of Ocepeia come from the Ouled Abdoun Basin of Morocco, a phosphate basin. Research on Ocepeia has been carried out by French and Moroccan researchers led by Dr. Emmanuel Gheerbrant of the National Museum of Natural History in Paris. Ocepeia fossils have been recovered from the Grand Daoui, Meraa El Arech, and Sidi Chennane quarries, with the latter bearing the most complete specimens. Some of the original material was collected on-site as early as 1997, while other material was obtained from fossil dealers.

Ocepeia was first described and named in 2001 by Gheerbrandt and Dr. Jean Sudre (University of Montpellier) based on two lower jaw fragments assigned to the new species O. daouiensis: one (designated CPSGM-MA1), bearing a premolar and first molar, is the holotype for the species. Additional material assigned to O. daouiensis was described in 2010, including a near-complete left lower jaw bone and additional dental fragments. In 2014, new specimens of O. daouiensis were described including a partial skull, upper jaw, and additional teeth, allowing for a complete reconstruction of what the intact skull looked like. The diversity of specimens, combined with CT scans of the partial skull, allowed for a much more detailed and comprehensive description. Additionally, new lower jaw fragments with larger teeth led to the description of O. grandis, whose holotype (designated MNHN.F PM37) bears a canine tooth and full set of cheek teeth. As of 2014, the skull of Ocepeia is the best-known mammal skull from the Paleocene of Africa (other species are only known from teeth or lower jaws), as well as the oldest known skull of any afrotherian.

=== Etymology ===
The name Ocepeia derives from the initials of Office Chérifien des Phosphates (O.C.P.), the national Moroccan phosphate mining company that supported paleontological research in the Ouled Abdoun Basin, (Note: O.C.P. is also commemorated in the names of the fossil crocodilian Ocepesuchus, and Ocepechelon, a giant fossil sea turtle.) while the specific name daouiensis derives from Sidi Daoui, a fossil quarry within the Basin. O. grandis is named for its larger size compared to O. daouiensis, "grandis" meaning "large" or "great" in Latin.

== Description ==
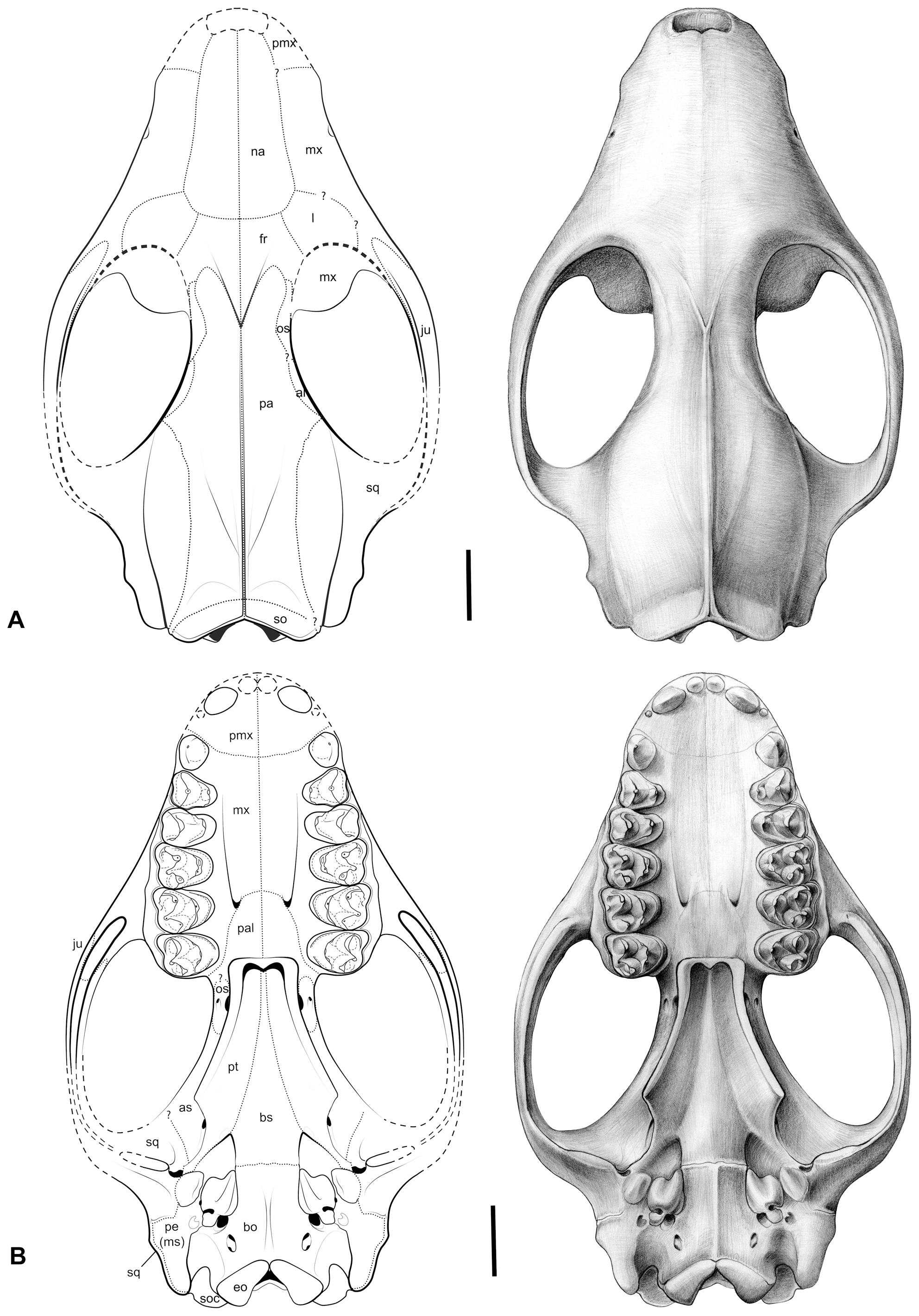
Reconstructed skull of O. daouiensis, viewed from above and below. Scale bar: 10 mm (0.39 in)

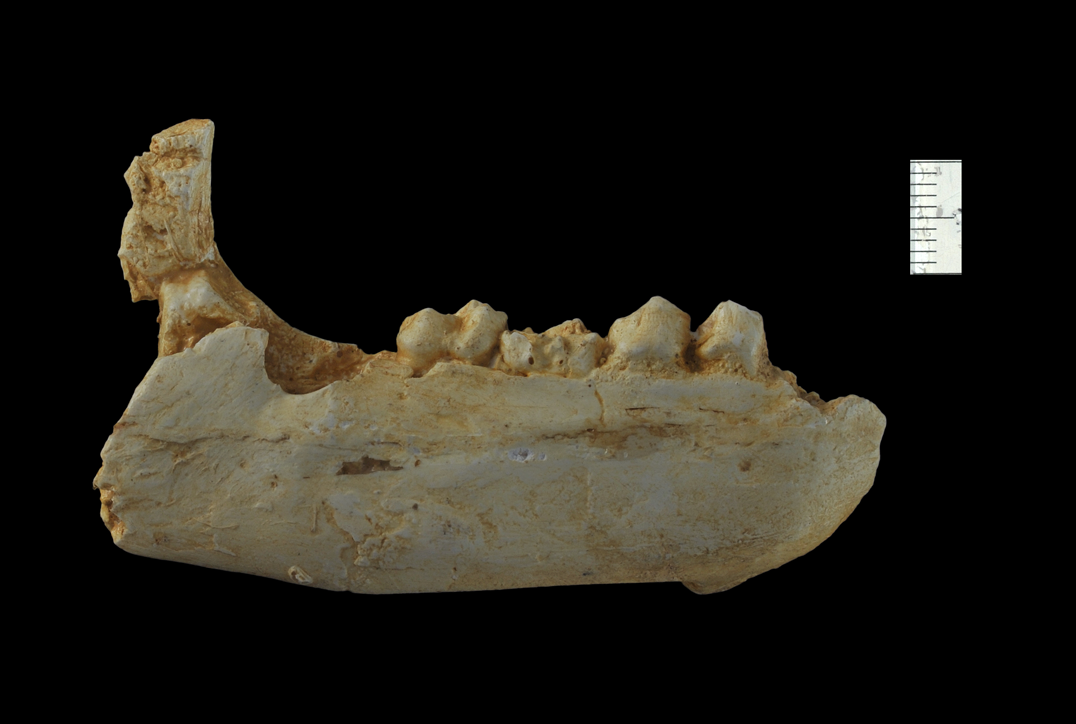
The lower jaw of O. grandis, which is larger and more robust than that of O. daouiensis. Scale bar: 10 mm (0.39 in)

Ocepeia shows a mixture of primitive and highly derived traits, including features shared with primitive eutherian mammals as well as features similar to those seen in primitive ungulates ("condylarths") and early paenungulates.

The skull of O. daouiensis was about 9 cm (3.5 in) in length and 5 cm (2.0 in) wide, estimated from reconstructions. O. grandis is known only from lower jaws with associated cheek teeth and isolated upper teeth.

Estimates of body weight of O. daouiensis range between 8.5 kg (19 lb), estimated from tooth length, and 2.5 kg (5.5 lb), estimated from skull length. Using average values for all ungulates, Gheerbrant et al. found the most likely estimate was 3.5 kg (7.7 lb). The dental remains of O. grandis are about 1.5 times larger than O. daouiensis, giving an estimated weight of 10–12 kg (22–26 lb). In body mass and skull size, O. daouiensis is similar to modern-day hyraxes and the extinct Meniscotherium.

=== Cranium ===
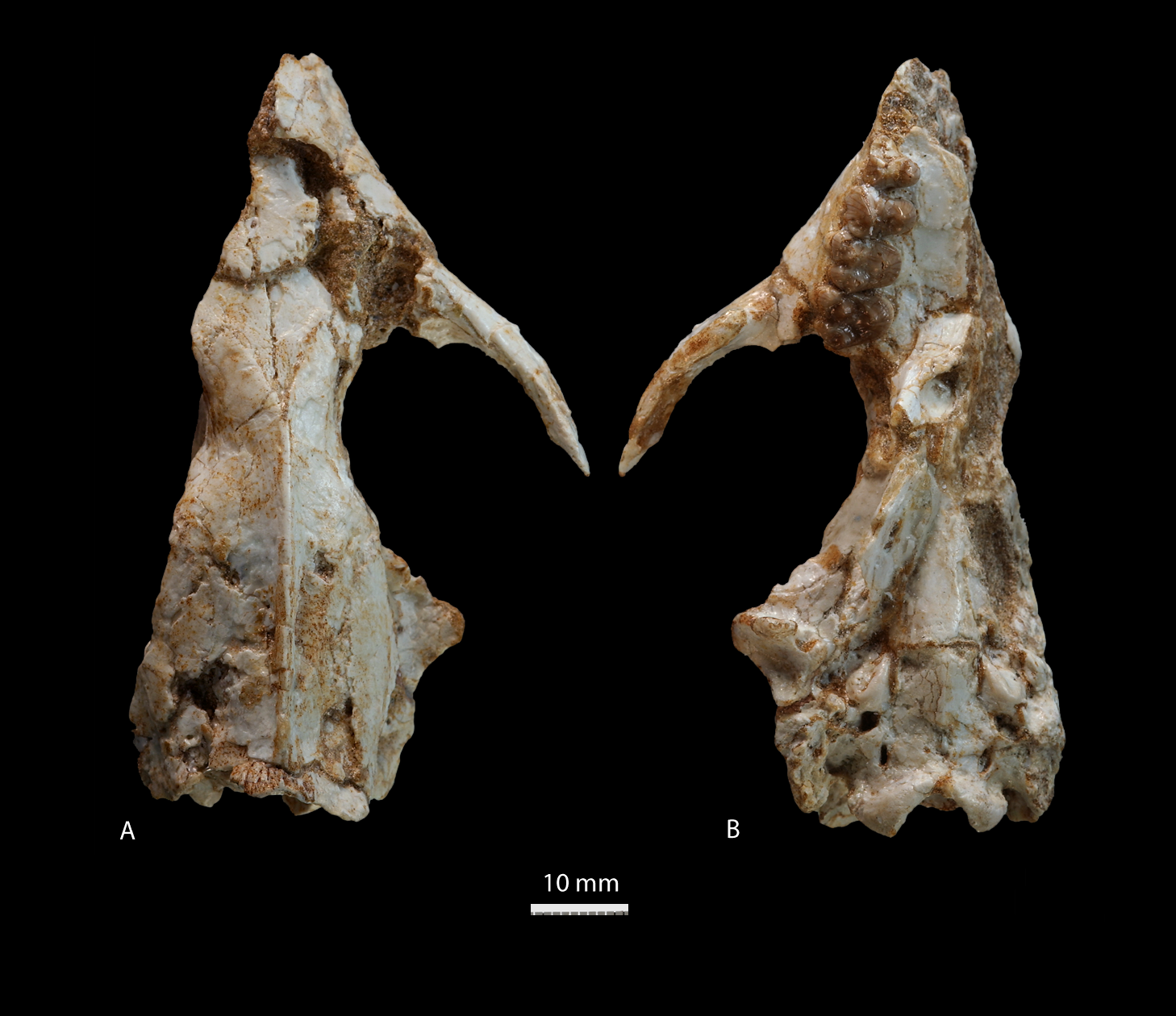
The most complete skull of O. daouiensis, in dorsal (A) and ventral view (B), believed to be a young adult female

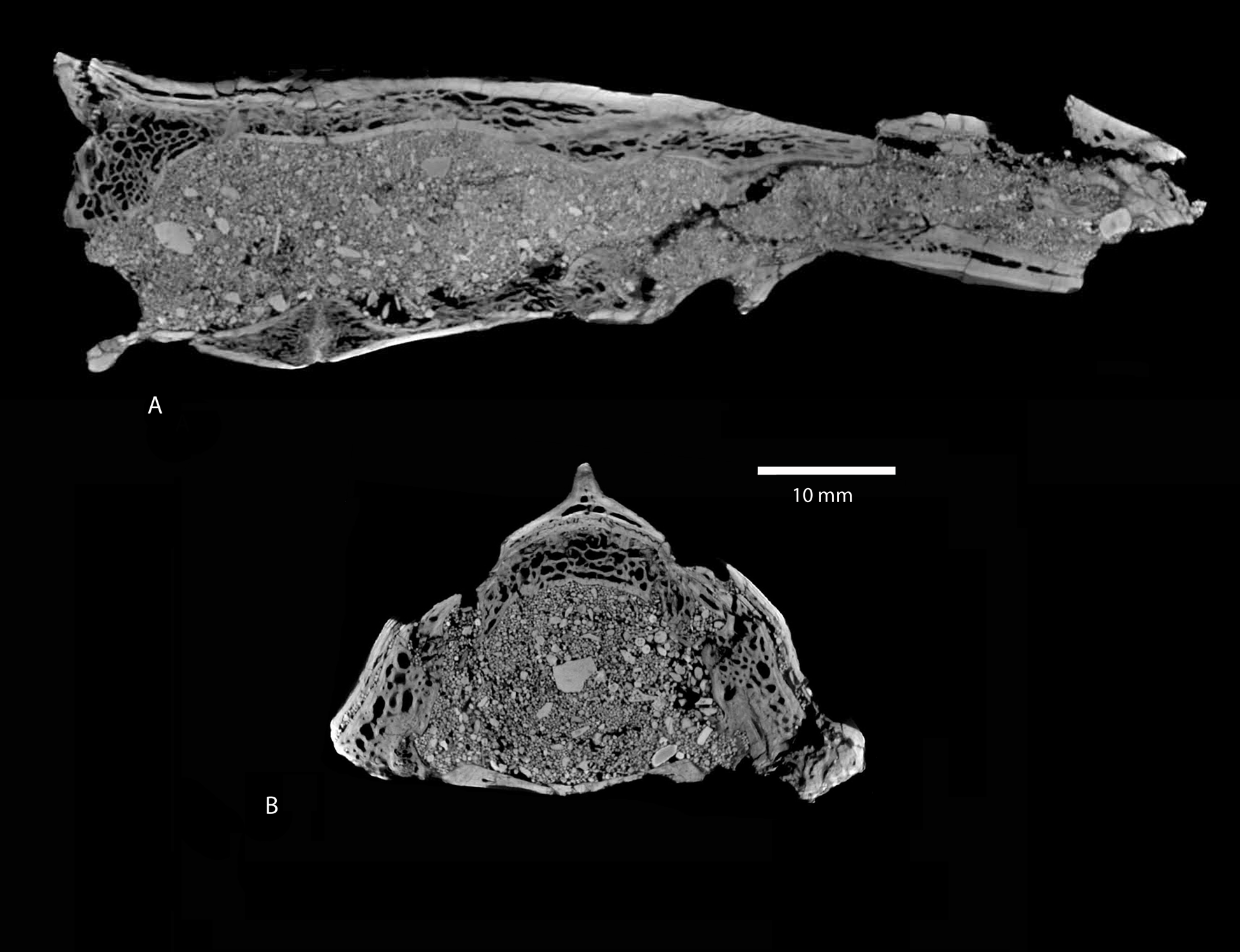
CT scans of the above skull in lateral (A) and cross-sectional view (B) show pronounced pneumatization (dark air spaces) in the upper and rear sections

The cranium of O. daouiensis is known from two specimens: one consisting of a partial cranium including upper jaw material, the other consisting of an upper jaw (maxilla) with associated teeth. The former specimen is most complete, but lacks many of the fully-grown male features, so it is assigned to a young adult female. The later specimen is proportionally larger, although less complete, and possesses features such as large canine teeth that allow it to be assigned to a fully-grown male. The skull of O. daouiensis is generally robust. The skull has a short and thick snout, noticeably like that of a primate. The cranium of O. daouiensis was largely pneumatised (possessed numerous air spaces), with a greatly thickened supraoccipital bone.

The cranial features Ocepeia shares with primitive eutherians include eye-sockets (orbits) set further back on the skull, relatively narrow cheek bones (zygomatic arches), and details of the inner ear, while characters it shares with paenungulates their paenungulate-like ancestors include a wide nasal cavity and a very short bony projection in the eye-socket. Its derived cranial features also include a large tegmen tympani, a dorsoventrally oriented large canal for the ramus superior, large and wing-like pars mastoidea, and a relatively diminished pars cochlearis. Pneumatised skulls are also found in larger proboscideans (e.g. elephants, mastodons, and other extinct relatives).

=== Dentition ===
The dental formula of Ocepeia is 3.1.2.33.1.2.3, meaning it has 3 incisors, 1 canine, 2 premolars, and 3 molars on each side of the upper and lower jaw. The ancestral eutherian condition is four premolars, and the evolutionary loss of the 1st and 2nd premolar, along with lack of a gap (diastema) between the canine and premolar, is one of the unique distinguishing traits of Ocepeia similar to those of simian primates. The large, stout canine teeth of O. daouiensis are 7.7–8 mm (about .3 in) long and also bear subtle similarities to primate canines. The tooth enamel is slightly wrinkled. The third incisor on the upper and lower jaws are small and vestigial.

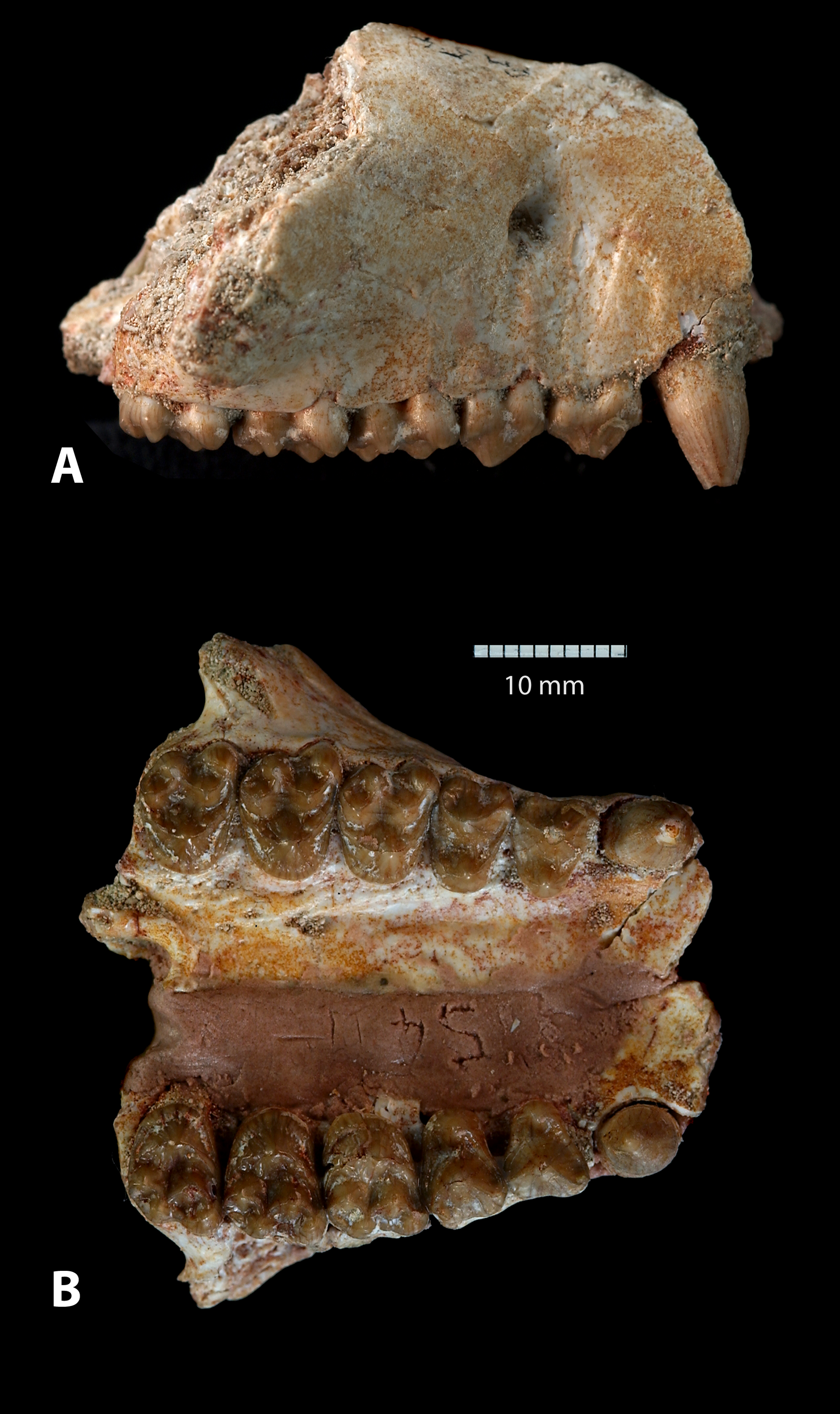
O. daouiensis upper jaw in lateral (A) and occlusal view (B), believed to be from an adult male

The molars are low-crowned (brachydont), with relatively rounded (bunodont) cusps running lengthwise (selenodont), resulting in a condition known as bunoselenodonty. The upper molars also lack a distinctive cusp (hypocone). Gheerbrant et al. noted these features and some others are shared with the pantodonts Haplolambda and Leptolambda, but due to many differences between the two, including number of teeth, the similarities are thought to be the result of convergent evolution.

The dental traits Ocepeia shares with primitive eutherians include large canines, simplified premolars, and the above-mentioned lack of a hypocone. The selenodont molars and vestigial third incisors are traits shared with paenungulates and proboscideans, respectively.

== Classification ==
Ocepeia has been placed in various positions within the group of archaic mammals known as "condylarths" (Note: The "Condylarthra" is an informal collection of diverse early Paleogene mammals, some of which gave rise to modern ungulates.) as successive discoveries yielded ever-more complete material. When first described, known only from a total of four teeth, Ocepeia was assigned to an undetermined family (uncertain position, or incertae sedis), tentatively in the Phenacodonta, with noted dental similarities to the arctocyonid Lambertocyon as well as the phenacodontid Ectocion. Upon reviewing new material in 2010, which included a more complete jawbone and canine teeth, Gheerbrant suggested Ocepeia was more primitive than any phenacodontid, and placed it as family incertae sedis tentatively assigned to the Paenungulata (a group including proboscideans, sea cows, hyraxes, and extinct relatives).

On describing the more complete materials including new details of the skull anatomy, in 2014 Gheerbrant et al. placed Ocepeia in its own new, monotypic family–Ocepeiidae– based on its many uniquely derived traits (autapomorphies) and placed the family in an undetermined (and possibly new) order tentatively within Paenungulata. However, in some of their cladistic analyses, Ocepeiidae was found to be basal within Afrotheria, but outside the Paenungulata, showing closer relationships with the Afroinsectiphilia (insectivore-like afrotherians including aardvarks and tenrecs), although this relationship was weakly supported morphologically. Despite the varying position, Gheerbrant et al. claimed the most likely position of Ocepeia was in a stem group to the paenungulate crown group due to the many shared traits with Paenungulates, including selenodont molars, yet used the cladogram (evolutionary tree) below as the reference tree in discussing the evolutionary position of Ocepeia. (Note: In a separate study, Ocepeia was classified as either a stem paenungulate or a stem member of the Atlantogenata.) The interpretation of Ocepeia as a stem-paenungulate sharing some similarities with Afroinsectiphilia led Gheerbrant et al. to call it a "transitional fossil" in the evolution of paenungulates from insectivore-like afrotherians. In 2016, Gheerbrant and colleagues proposed the new group Paenungulatomorpha to accommodate Paenungulata as well as Ocepeia and Abdounodus, another Paleocene African mammal.

Note that the following cladogram used by Gheerbrant et al. depicts Perissodactyla—a clade which includes horses—as being among other Afrotherians. It is now known that Perissodactyls are members of Euungulata, which are only distantly related to other Afrotherians.

- - Basal eutherians
    Maelestes, Cimolestes, Asioryctes,
    leptictids, Acristatherium
  - - Todralestes
    - - Zhelestidae
      - - Protoungulatum
        - Arctocyonidae
        - - - Ptolemaia
            - Orycteropus - Aardvarks
          - - - Ocepeia
            - Potamogale
        - - Hyopsodus
          - - Phenacodonta
            - - Macroscelidea - Elephant shrews
              - - Teilhardimys
                - - - Perissodactyla - Horses, rhinos and tapirs (Note: Although this cladogram groups Paenungulata with Perissodactyla ("odd-toed ungulates", a group generally placed in Laurasiatheria, not Afrotheria), Gheerbrant et al. suggested the grouping in this analysis was due to convergent evolution of lophodont molars in both groups and gaps in the fossil record.)
                    - Radinskya
                  - Paenungulata
                    - Hyracoidea - Hyraxes and their extinct relatives
                    - - Anthracobunia
                      - - - Eritherium - oldest known Proboscidean
                          - - Phosphatherium
                            - Numidotherium
                        - - Desmostylia
                          - - Sirenia - Sea-cows
                            - - Minchenella
                              - - Phenacolophus
                                - Embrithopoda

== Paleobiology ==
=== Diet ===
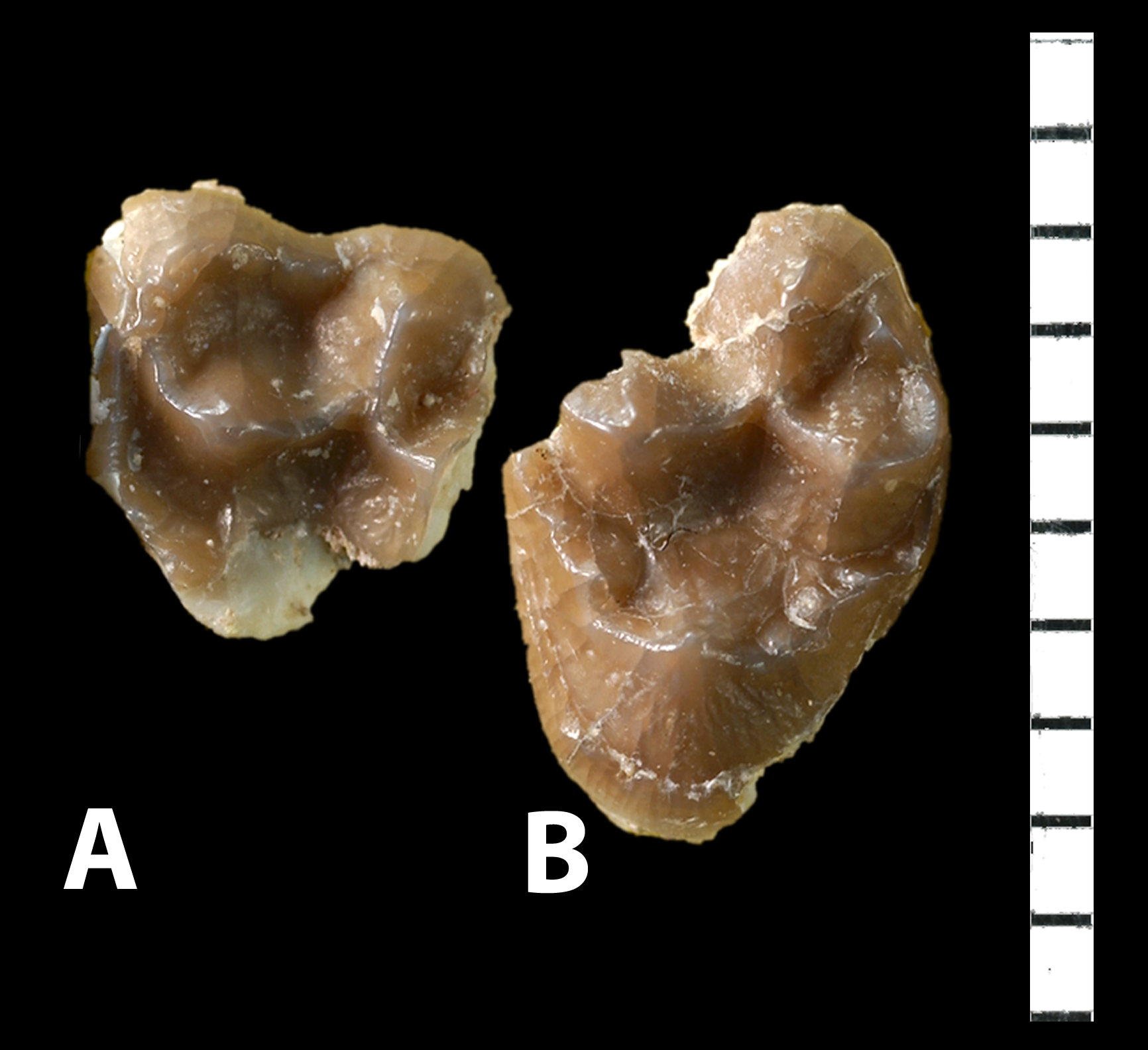
Cusp view of two upper molars of O. grandis. Scale bar: 10 mm

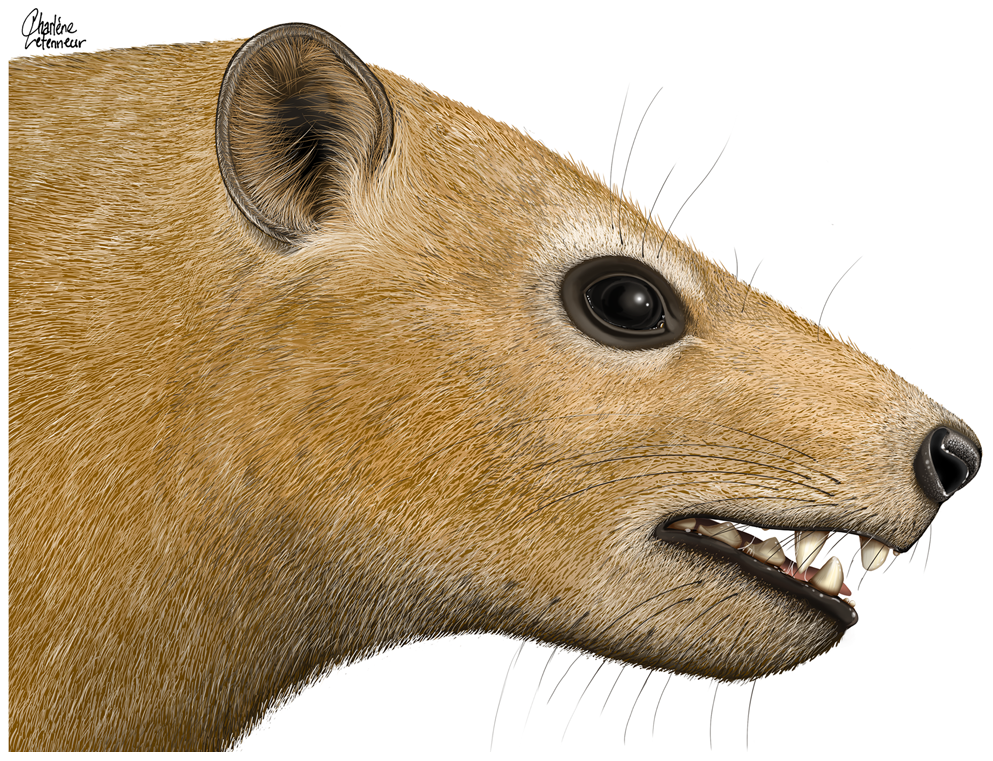
Life restoration of the head

In remarking on the short snout and strong jaw, features often seen in primates, Gheerbrant (2010) suggested that Ocepeia was similarly a leaf-eater, although "peculiarly specialized": the anterior teeth probably had great strength for gripping or shearing food, and the molars show a shape and wear pattern suggesting they functioned primarily in shearing, as opposed to grinding or crushing. Gheerbrant further speculated that Ocepeia may have shared a similar arboreal lifestyle with primates. The larger, more strongly-cusped molars of O. grandis suggest it specialized in harder food than O. daouiensis.

=== Sexual dimorphism ===
O. daouiensis shows sexual dimorphism in the relative proportions of the skull, while the potential for dimorphism in O. grandis is unknown. The adaptive significance of the pneumatized skull bones is not known, but Gheerbrant et al. speculated it may be related to enhanced transmission of sounds.

== Paleoecology ==
Ocepeia is from the Paleocene of Morocco's Ouled Abdoun Basin, although its fossils were initially thought to be earliest Ypresian (early Eocene) in age. That age has been revised, and now it is known that O. daouiensis comes from the same bone bed that is dated to the Selandian age of the Paleocene (59-60 MYA), which also yields Eritherium, Abdounodus, and Lahimia. O. grandis is slightly younger (more recent) in age, occurring in the Thanetian bone bed of the same area. Its larger size and younger age suggest it is in the same evolutionary lineage as O. daouiensis. (Note: See Cope's rule, an evolutionary trend for lineages to increase in body size over time.) The area of western Morocco during the late Cretaceous through the Eocene consisted of warm, shallow inland seas, where the ancient Tethys Ocean met the Atlantic Ocean, and during which phosphate deposits and associated fossils accumulated over some 25 million years.

Gheerbrant et al. concluded that the early presence of Ocepeia in Africa, and its specialized features indicate a long history of diversification in Africa, which supports hypotheses of endemic evolution of Afrotheria and placental mammals in Africa, in contrast to hypotheses supposing they originated from Laurasia, the northern supercontinent comprising much of present-day North America, Europe, and Asia.

Other mammals from the Ouled Abdoun come from upper levels of Ypresian age and include Phosphatherium (Proboscidea), Seggeurius (Hyracoidea), Daouitherium (Proboscidea), Boualitomus (Hyaenodontidae), and a poorly known undetermined species. Among them Phosphatherium is the best known and most frequent. Mammals are extremely rare in the Ouled Abdoun in contrast to the associated marine vertebrate fauna which includes sea birds, sharks, bony fish, and marine reptiles (including crocodilians, sea turtles, and the sea snake Palaeophis). Terrestrial species were probably transported off shore into the Moroccan sea before fossilization.
