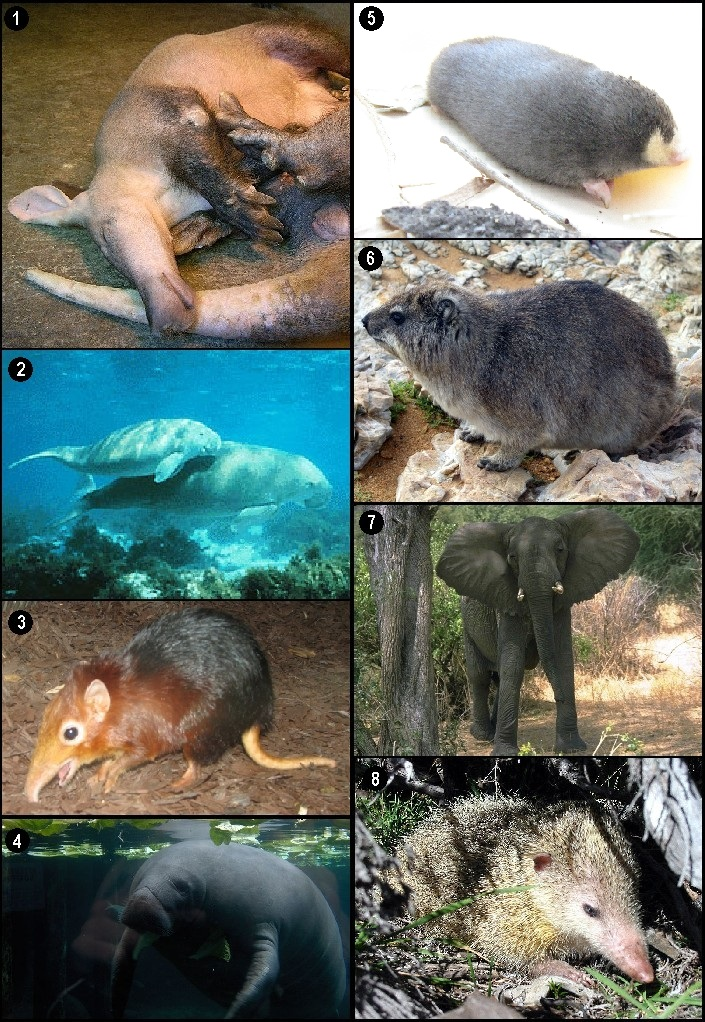
- 1. Aardvark 2. Dugong 3. Black and rufous elephant shrew 4. West Indian manatee 5. Cape golden mole 6. Rock hyrax 7. African bush elephant 8. Tailless tenrec

Scientific classification
- Kingdom: Animalia
- Phylum: Chordata
- Class: Mammalia
- Magnorder: Atlantogenata
- Superorder: Afrotheria; Stanhope MJ, Waddell VG, Madsen O, de Jong W, Hedges SB, Cleven G, Kao D, Springer MS, 1998

Orders
- See below
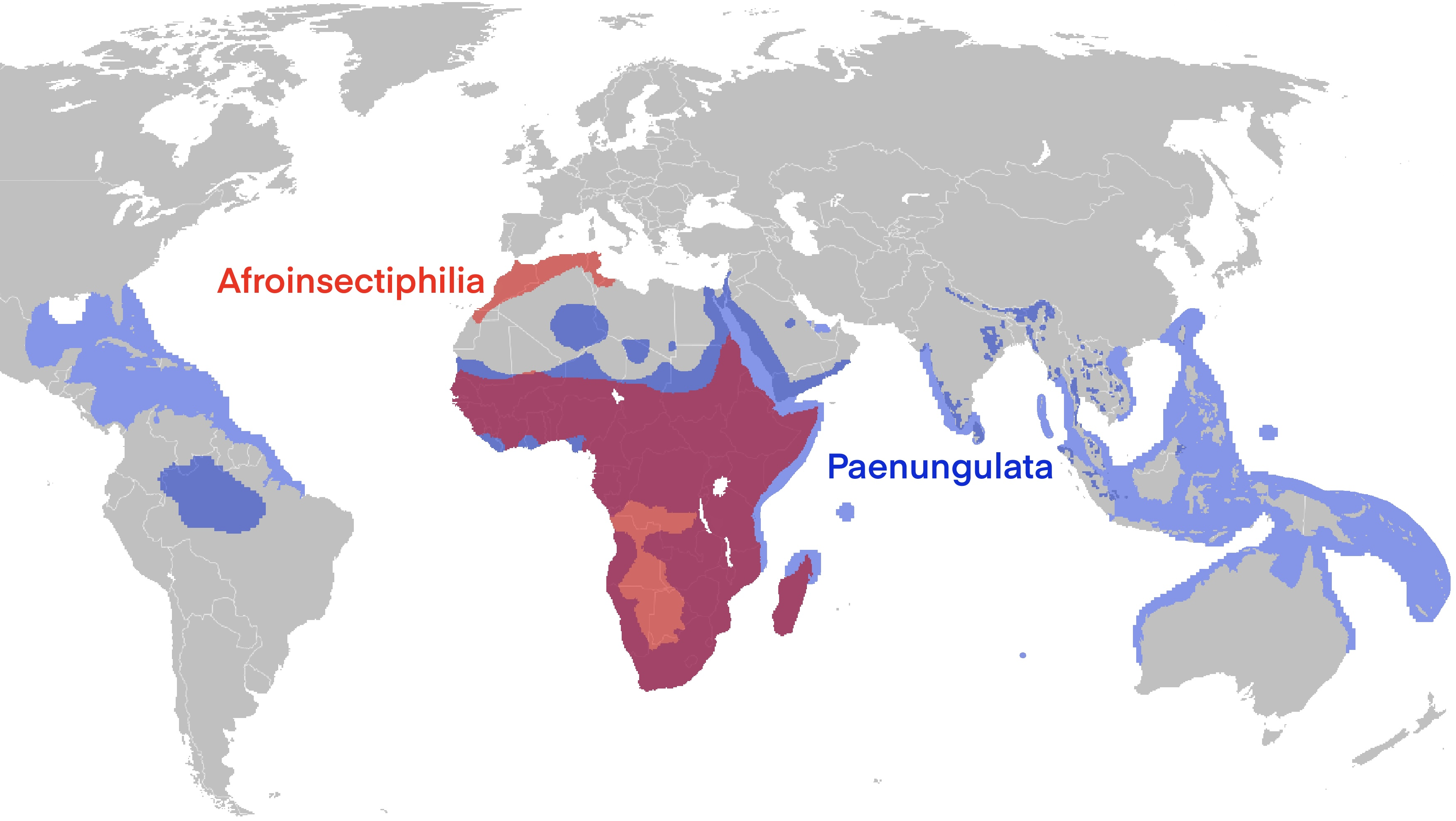

= Afrotheria =

Afrotheria Temporal range: Paleocene – Holocene, 65–0 Ma

Superorder of mammals containing elephants and elephant shrews

Afrotheria (/ˌæfroʊˈθɪəriə/; from Latin Afro- "of Africa" + theria "wild beast") is a superorder of placental mammals, the living members of which belong to groups that are either currently living in Africa or of African origin: golden moles, elephant shrews (also known as sengis), otter shrews, tenrecs, aardvarks, hyraxes, elephants, sea cows, and several extinct clades. Most groups of afrotheres share little or no superficial resemblance, and their similarities have only become known in recent times due to genetics and molecular studies. Many afrothere groups are found mostly or exclusively in Africa, reflecting the fact that Africa was an island continent from the Cretaceous until the early Miocene around 20 million years ago, when Afro-Arabia collided with Eurasia.

Because Africa was isolated by water, Laurasian groups of mammals such as insectivores, rodents, lagomorphs, carnivorans and ungulates could not reach Africa for much of the early to mid-Cenozoic. Instead, the niches occupied by those groups on the northern continents were filled by various groups of afrotheres via the process of convergent evolution. The small insectivorous afrotheres such as elephant shrews, golden moles, and tenrecs filled the niches of insectivores, the hyraxes filled the roles of rodents and lagomorphs, the aardvarks filled the roles of various medium size ant-eating mammals (anteaters, armadillos, pangolins, echidnas, numbats, etc.) found on other continents throughout the Cenozoic, and proboscideans (elephants and their relatives) filled the roles of large herbivores such as hippos, camels, rhinos, and tapirs. The sirenians developed aquatic body plans and started spreading to other parts of the world by water (evolving convergently with the other groups of marine mammals such as cetaceans and pinnipeds). In addition to their similarity with Laurasian mammals in North America, Europe, and Asia, many afrotheres also exhibit convergent evolution with groups of mammals that evolved and lived exclusively in South America, which was also an island continent for much of the Cenozoic.

The common ancestry of these animals was not recognized until the late 1990s. Historically, the Paenungulata had been linked to the true ungulates (particularly the perissodactyls); the golden mole, tenrecs, and elephant shrews with the traditional (and polyphyletic/incorrect) taxon Insectivora; and the aardvarks with the pangolins and the xenarthrans within the invalid taxon Edentata. Continuing work on the molecular and morphological diversity of afrotherian mammals has provided ever increasing support for their common ancestry.

== Evolutionary relationships ==
The afrotherian clade was originally proposed in 1998 based on analyses of DNA sequence data. However, previous studies had hinted at the close interrelationships among subsets of endemic African mammals; some of these studies date to the 1920s and there were sporadic papers in the 1980s and 1990s. The core of the Afrotheria consists of the Paenungulata, i.e., elephants, sea cows, and hyraxes, a group with a long history among comparative anatomists. Hence, while DNA sequence data have proven essential to infer the existence of the Afrotheria as a whole, and while the Afroinsectiphilia (insectivoran-grade afrotheres including tenrecs, golden moles, sengis, and aardvarks) were not recognized as part of Afrotheria without DNA data, some precedent is found in the comparative anatomical literature for the idea that at least part of this group forms a clade. The Paleocene genus Ocepeia, which is the most completely-known Paleocene African mammal and the oldest afrotherian known from a complete skull, shares similarities with both Paenungulata and Afroinsectiphilia, and may help to characterize the ancestral body type of afrotherians.

Since the 1990s, increasing molecular and anatomical data have been applied to the classification of animals. Both types of data support the idea that afrotherian mammals are descended from a single common ancestor to the exclusion of other mammals. On the anatomical side, features shared by most, if not all, afrotheres include high vertebral counts, aspects of placental membrane formation, the shape of the ankle bones, the relatively late eruption of the permanent dentition, and undescended testicles remaining in the body near the kidneys. The snout is unusually long and mobile in several Afrotherian species, and this was pointed out as a possible shared-derived character. Studies of genomic data, including millions of aligned nucleotides sampled for a growing number of placental mammals, also support Afrotheria as a clade. Additionally, there might be some dental synapomorphies uniting afroinsectiphilians, if not afrotheres as a whole: p4 talonid and trigonid of similar breadth, a prominent p4 hypoconid, presence of a P4 metacone and absence of parastyles on M1–2.

Afrotheria is now recognized as one of the three major groups within the Eutheria (containing placental mammals). Relations within the three cohorts, Afrotheria, Xenarthra, Boreoeutheria, and the identity of the placental root, remain somewhat controversial.

Afrotheria as a clade has usually been discussed without a Linnaean rank, but has been assigned the rank of cohort, magnorder, and superorder. One reconstruction, which applies the molecular clock, proposes that the oldest split occurred between Afrotheria and the other two some 105 million years ago in the mid-Cretaceous, when the African continent was separated from other major land masses. This idea is consistent with the fossil record of Xenarthra, which is restricted to South America (following recent consensus that Eurotamandua is not a xenarthran).

However, Afrotheria itself does not have a fossil record restricted to Africa, and appears in fact to have evolved in the continent's isolation. More recent, genomic-scale phylogenies favor the hypothesis that Afrotheria and Xenarthra comprise sister taxa at the base of the placental mammal radiation, suggesting an ancient Gondwanan clade of placental mammals. A 2021 morphological study also proposed to render Meridiungulata polyphyletic and recognise most of its clades as part of a group called Sudamericungulata, closely related to hyraxes, while Litopterna remains a sister taxon to Perissodactyla.

Relations between the various afrotherian orders are still being studied. On the basis of molecular studies, elephants and manatees appear to be related, and likewise elephant shrews and aardvarks. These findings are compatible with the work of earlier anatomists.

=== Phylogeny ===
Phylogenetic position of afrotherians (in red) among placentals in a genus-level molecular phylogeny of 116 extant mammals inferred from the gene tree information of 14,509 coding DNA sequences. The other major clades are colored: marsupials (magenta), xenarthrans (orange), laurasiatherians (green), and euarchontoglires (blue).

- Afrotheria
  - Paenungulata
    - Hyracoidea
      Procaviidae
    - Tethytheria
      - Sirenia
        - Trichechidae
        - Dugongidae
      - Proboscidea
        Elephantidae
  - Afroinsectiphilia
    - Tubulidentata
      Orycteropodidae
    - Afroinsectivora
      - Macroscelidea
        Macroscelididae
      - Afrosoricida
        - Chrysochloridae
        - Tenrecomorpha
          - Potamogalidae
          - Tenrecidae

A cladogram of Afrotheria based on molecular evidence

== Current status and distribution ==
Many extant members of Afrotheria appear to have a high risk of extinction (perhaps related to the large size of many). Species loss within this already small group would comprise a particularly great loss of genetic and evolutionary diversity. The IUCN Afrotheria Specialist Group notes that Afrotheria, as currently reconstructed, includes nearly a third of all mammalian orders currently found in Africa and Madagascar, but only 75 of more than 1,200 mammalian species in those areas.

While most extant species assigned to Afrotheria live in Africa, some (such as the Indian elephant and three of the four sirenian species) occur elsewhere; many of these are also endangered. Prior to the Quaternary extinction event, proboscideans were present on every continent of the world except Australia and Antarctica. Hyraxes lived in much of Eurasia as recently as the end of the Pliocene. The extinct afrotherian orders of embrithopods and desmostylians were also once widely distributed. However, the desmostylians have recently been viewed as possible perissodactyls, rather than afrotheres, although this is still controversial. The taxonomic placement of embrithopods is also not clear.

== Classification ==
Afrotheria is a clade of placental mammals, the stem designation for which is Eutheria. Based on precedent, some clades are junior synonyms and arguably should be replaced.

- Afrotheria
  - Family †Hyopsodontidae: (possible member of stem group; possibly perissodactyls related to horses instead
  - Clade Afroinsectiphilia
    - Order Tubulidentata: aardvark (Africa south of the Sahara)
    - Order †Ptolemaiida: poorly understood carnivorous mammals
    - Clade Afroinsectivora
      - Order Macroscelidea: elephant shrews (northwest and sub-Saharan Africa)
      - Order Afrosoricida: otter shrews, tenrecs and golden moles (sub-Saharan Africa and Madagascar)
  - Clade Paenungulatomorpha
    - †Hadrogeneios (basal)
    - †Ocepeia: (basal)
    - †Abdounodus (basal) sister taxa to Ocepeia
    - Clade Paenungulata
      - Order Hyracoidea: hyraxes or dassies (Africa, Middle East)
      - ?Order †Pyrotheria
      - ?Order †Astrapotheria
      - ?Order †Desmostylia (tentatively placed in Perissodactyla by a 2014 cladistic analysis)
      - Order †Embrithopoda
      - Order Proboscidea: elephants (Africa, Southeast Asia)
      - Order Sirenia: dugong and manatees (cosmopolitan tropical)

== See also ==
- Evolution of mammals
- Fauna of Africa
