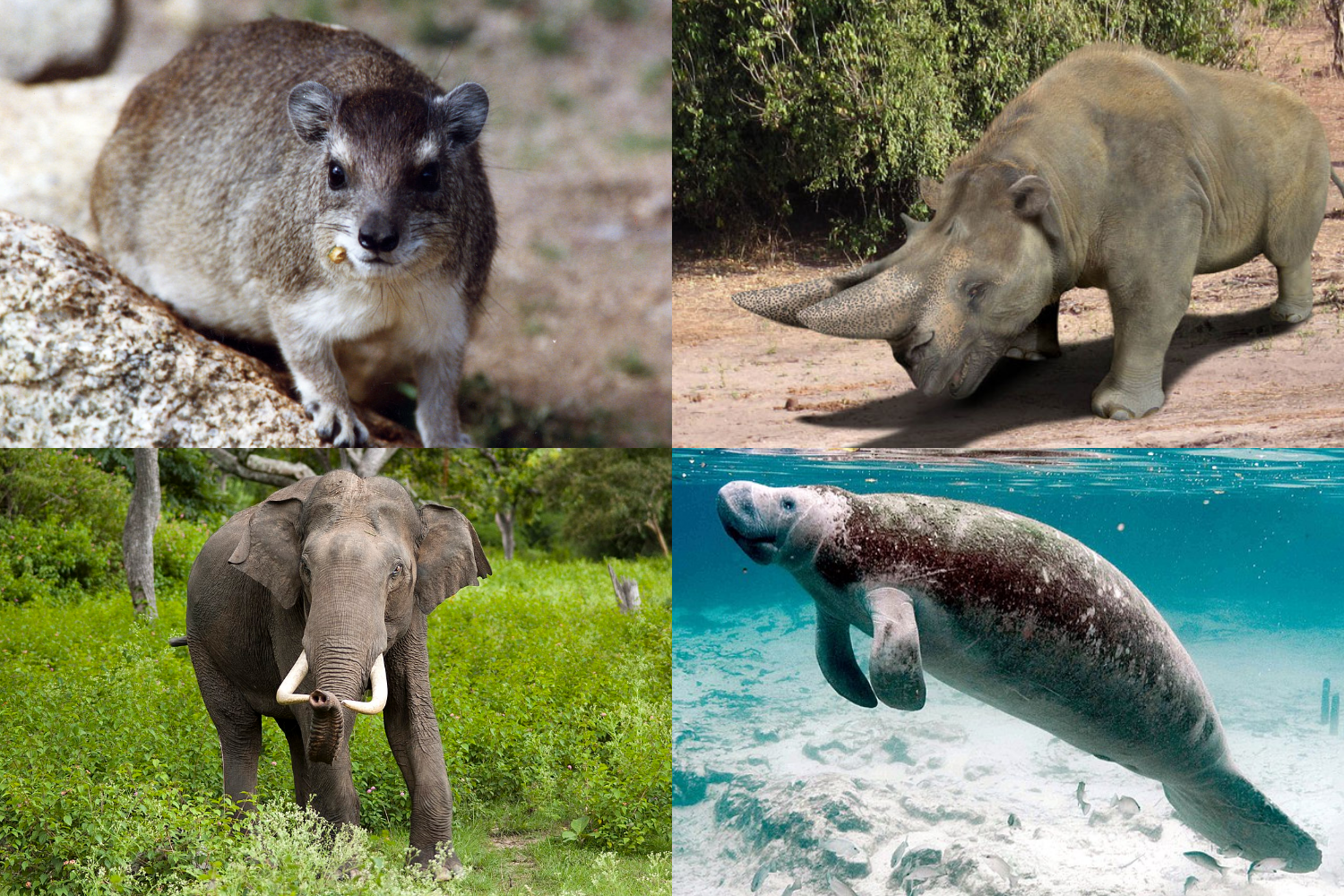
- Top: rock hyrax (Hyracoidea), Arsinoitherium zitteli (†Embrithopoda); bottom: Asian elephant (Proboscidea), West Indian manatee (Sirenia).

Scientific classification
- Kingdom: Animalia
- Phylum: Chordata
- Class: Mammalia
- Superorder: Afrotheria
- Clade: Paenungulatomorpha
- Grandorder: Paenungulata; Simpson, 1945

Subgroups
- Hyracoidea; †Sudamericungulata?; Tethytheria
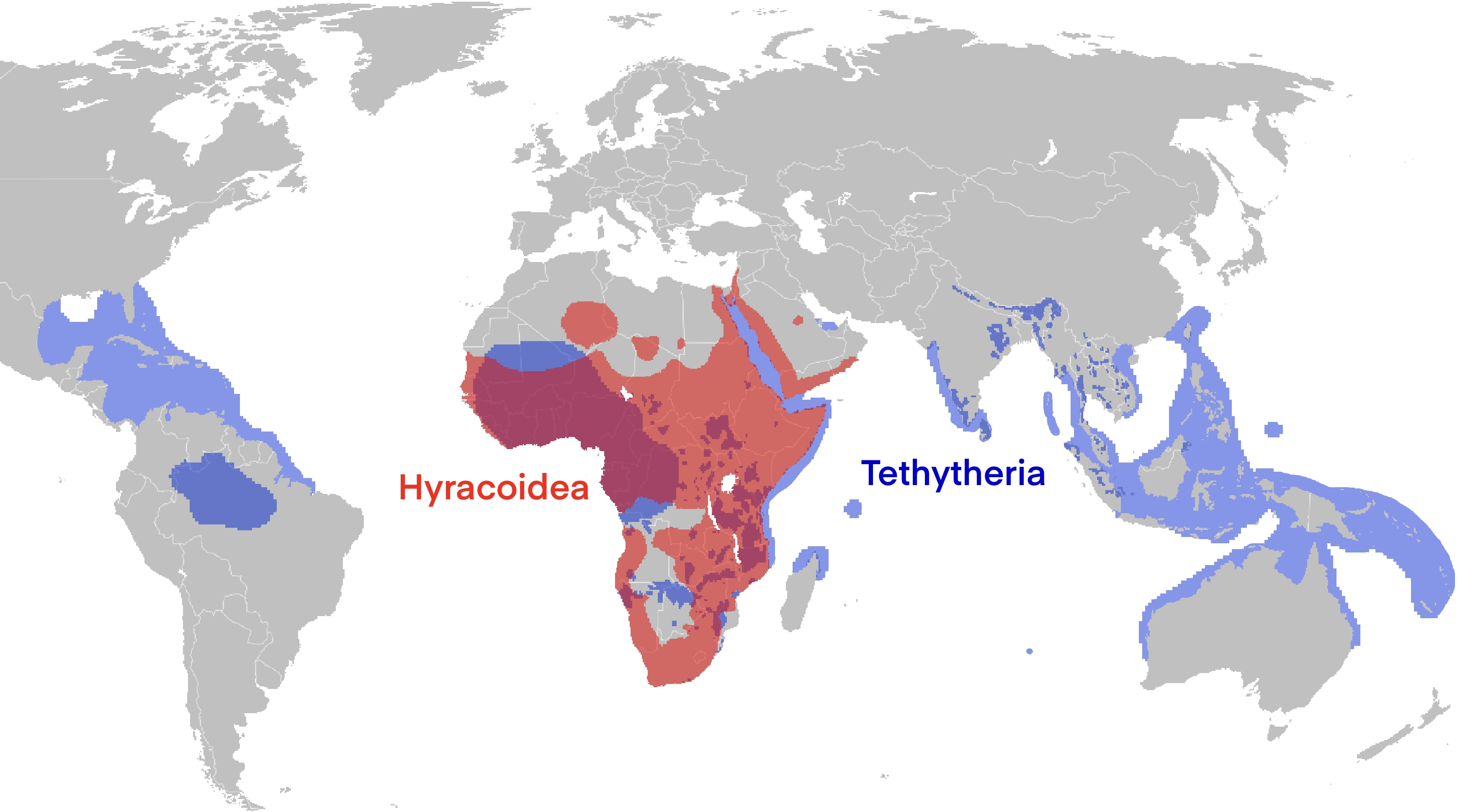

= Paenungulata =

Paenungulata Temporal range: Paleocene - Recent, 61–0 Ma

Group of mammals

Paenungulata, also known as Uranotheria, is a clade of sub-ungulates, which groups three extant mammal orders: Proboscidea (including elephants), Sirenia (sea cows, including dugongs and manatees), and Hyracoidea (hyraxes). At least two more possible orders are known only as fossils, namely Embrithopoda and Desmostylia. (Note: Desmostylians, however, have been placed in Perissodactyla by a 2014 cladistic analysis, and the taxonomic placement of embrithopods has also been questioned though recently supported.)

Molecular evidence indicates that Paenungulata (or at least its extant members) is part of the cohort Afrotheria, an ancient assemblage of mainly African mammals of great diversity. The other members of this cohort are the orders Afrosoricida (tenrecs and golden moles), Macroscelidea (elephant shrews) and Tubulidentata (aardvarks).

Of the three extant Paenungulate orders, hyraxes (Procaviidae) are sister to a clade containing the sirenians and elephants. The latter two, together with the extinct order Embrithopoda, are grouped as the Tethytheria, because it is thought that their common ancestors lived on the shores of the prehistoric Tethys Sea; however, recent myoglobin studies indicate that even Hyracoidea had an aquatic ancestor.

== History ==
In 1945, George Gaylord Simpson used traditional taxonomic techniques to group these spectacularly diverse mammals in the superorder he named Paenungulata ("almost ungulates"), but there were many loose threads in unravelling their genealogy. For example, hyraxes in his Paenungulata had some characteristics suggesting they might be connected to the Perissodactyla (odd-toed ungulates, such as horses and rhinos). Indeed, early taxonomists placed the Hyracoidea closest to the rhinoceroses because of their dentition.

When genetic techniques were developed for inspecting amino acid differences among haemoglobin sequences the most parsimonious cladograms depicted Simpson's Paenungulata as an authentic clade and as one of the first groups to diversify among the placental mammals (Eutheria). The amino acid sequences reject a connection between extant paenungulates and perissodactyls (odd-toed ungulates).

However, a 2014 cladistic analysis placed anthracobunids and desmostylians, two major extinct groups that have been considered to be non-African afrotheres, close to each other within Perissodactyla.

== Phylogeny ==
- Afrotheria
  - Paenungulata
    - Hyracoidea
      Procaviidae
    - Tethytheria
      - Sirenia
        - Trichechidae
        - Dugongidae
      - Proboscidea
        Elephantidae
  - Afroinsectiphilia
    - Tubulidentata
      Orycteropodidae
    - Afroinsectivora
      - Macroscelidea
        Macroscelididae
      - Afrosoricida
        - Chrysochloridae
        - Tenrecomorpha
          - Potamogalidae
          - Tenrecidae

A cladogram of Afrotheria based on molecular evidence

== Gallery ==
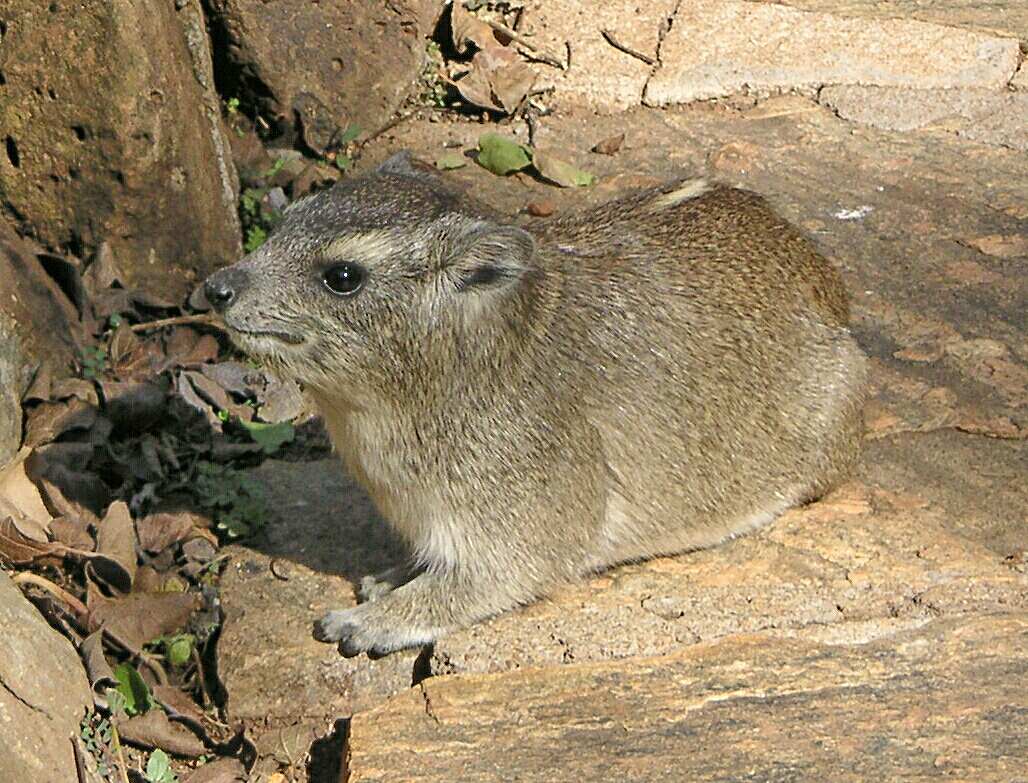
The rodent-like hyrax

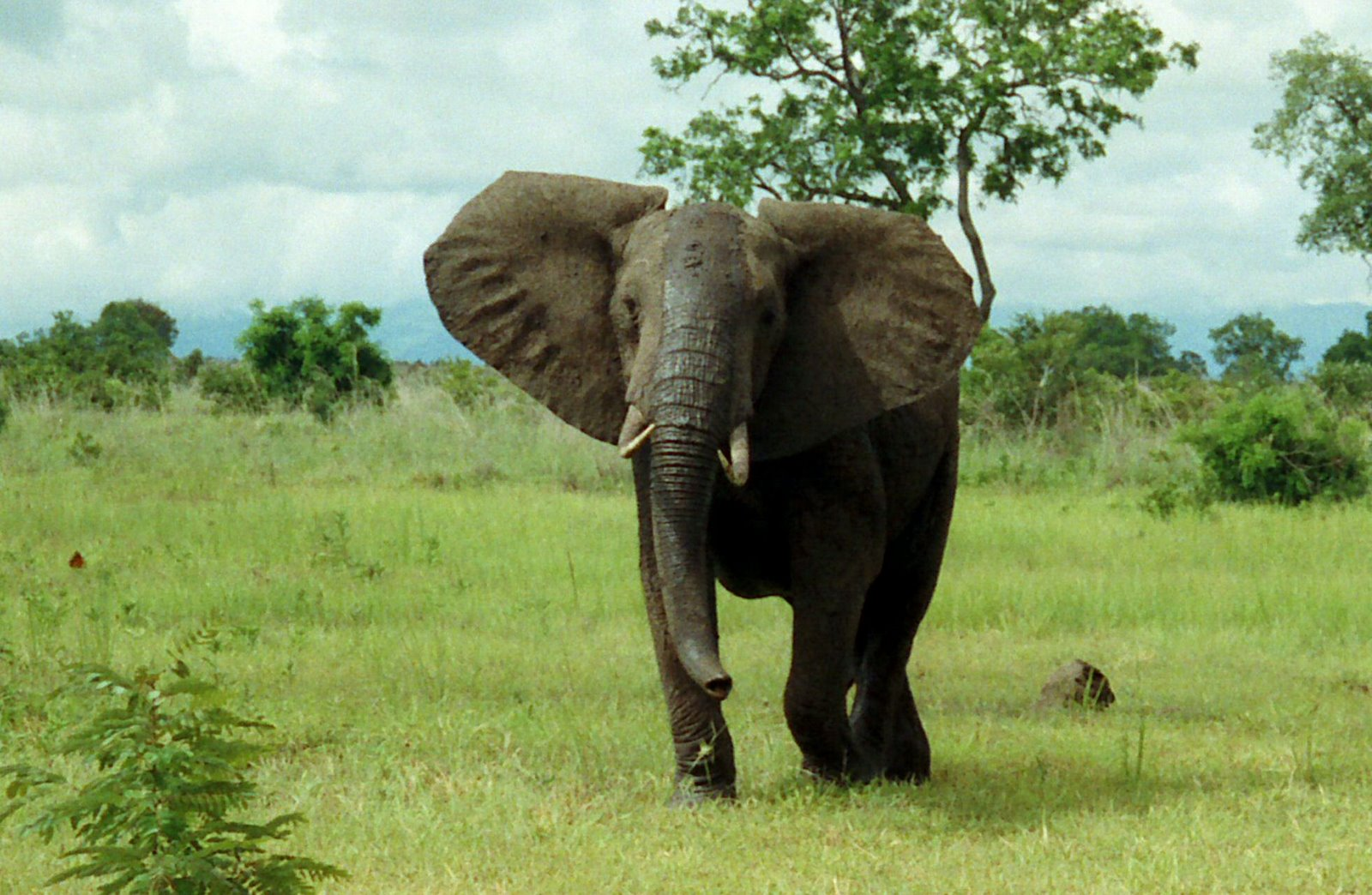
A bull bush elephant

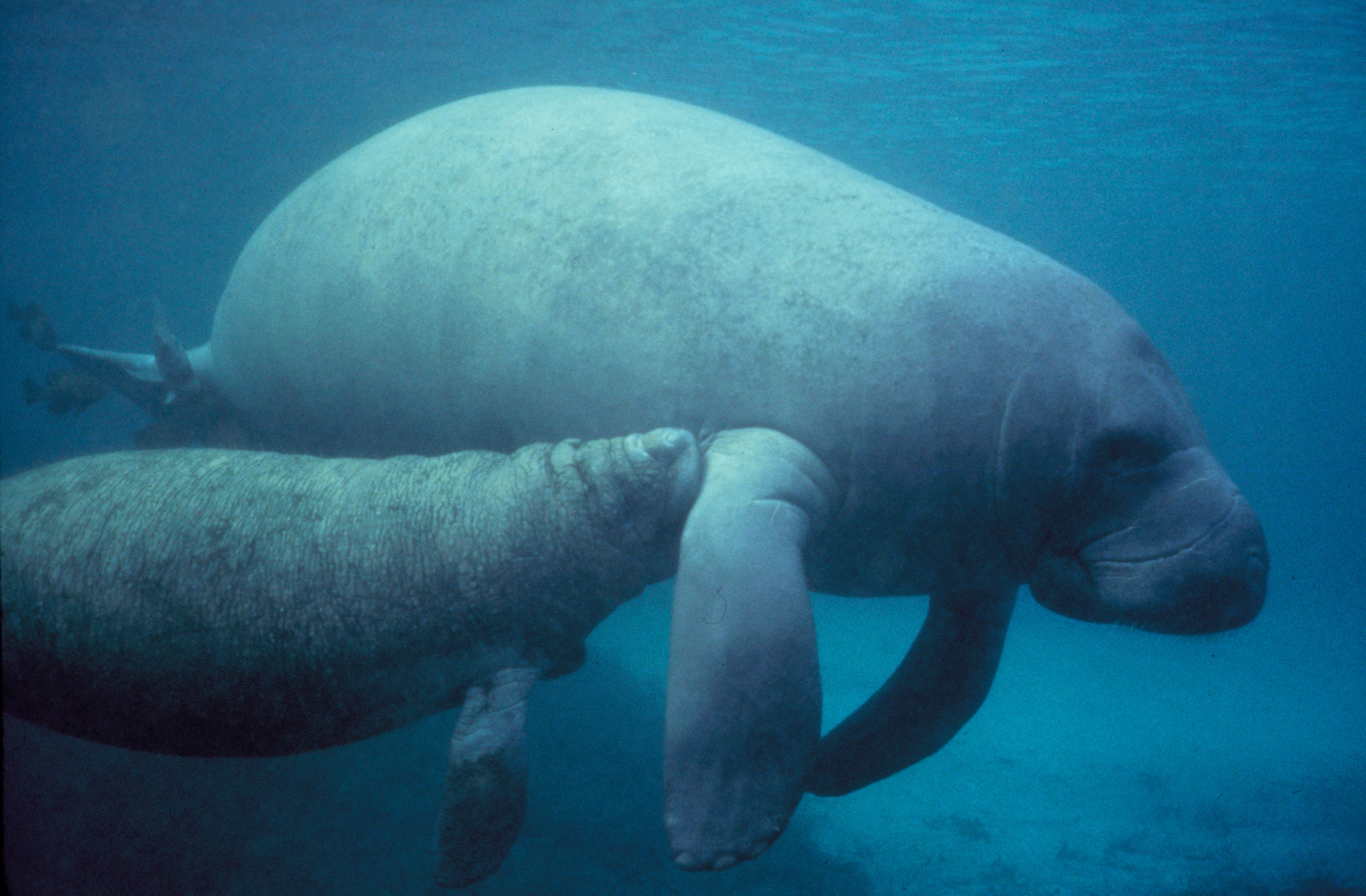
A manatee and her calf

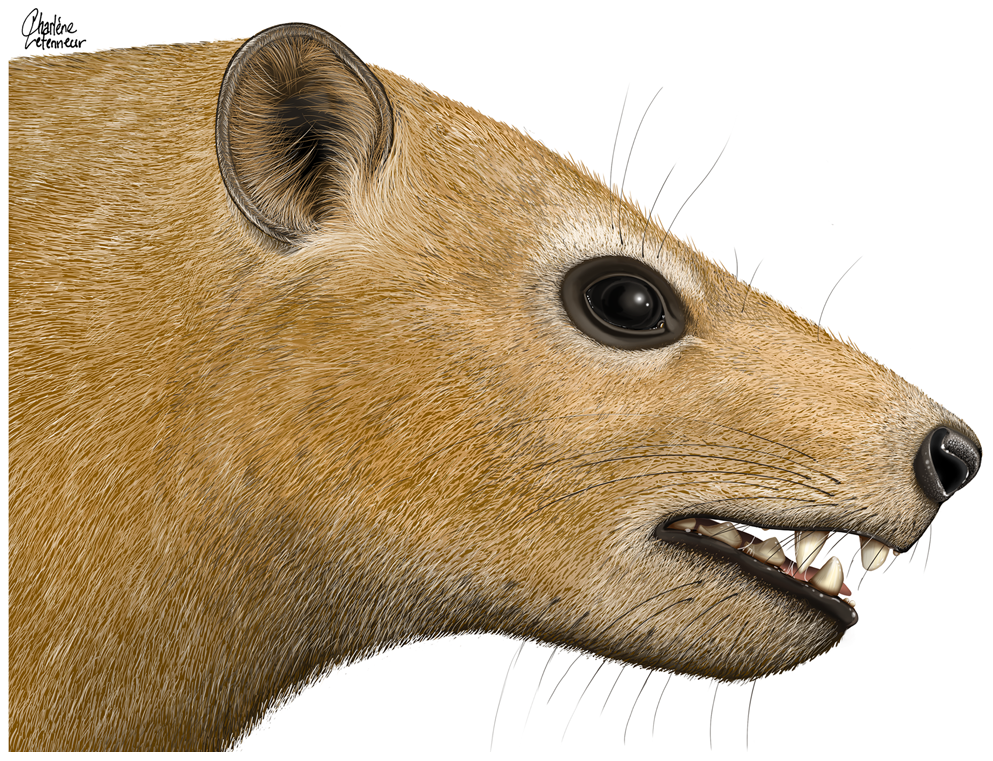
Ocepeia, a basal species

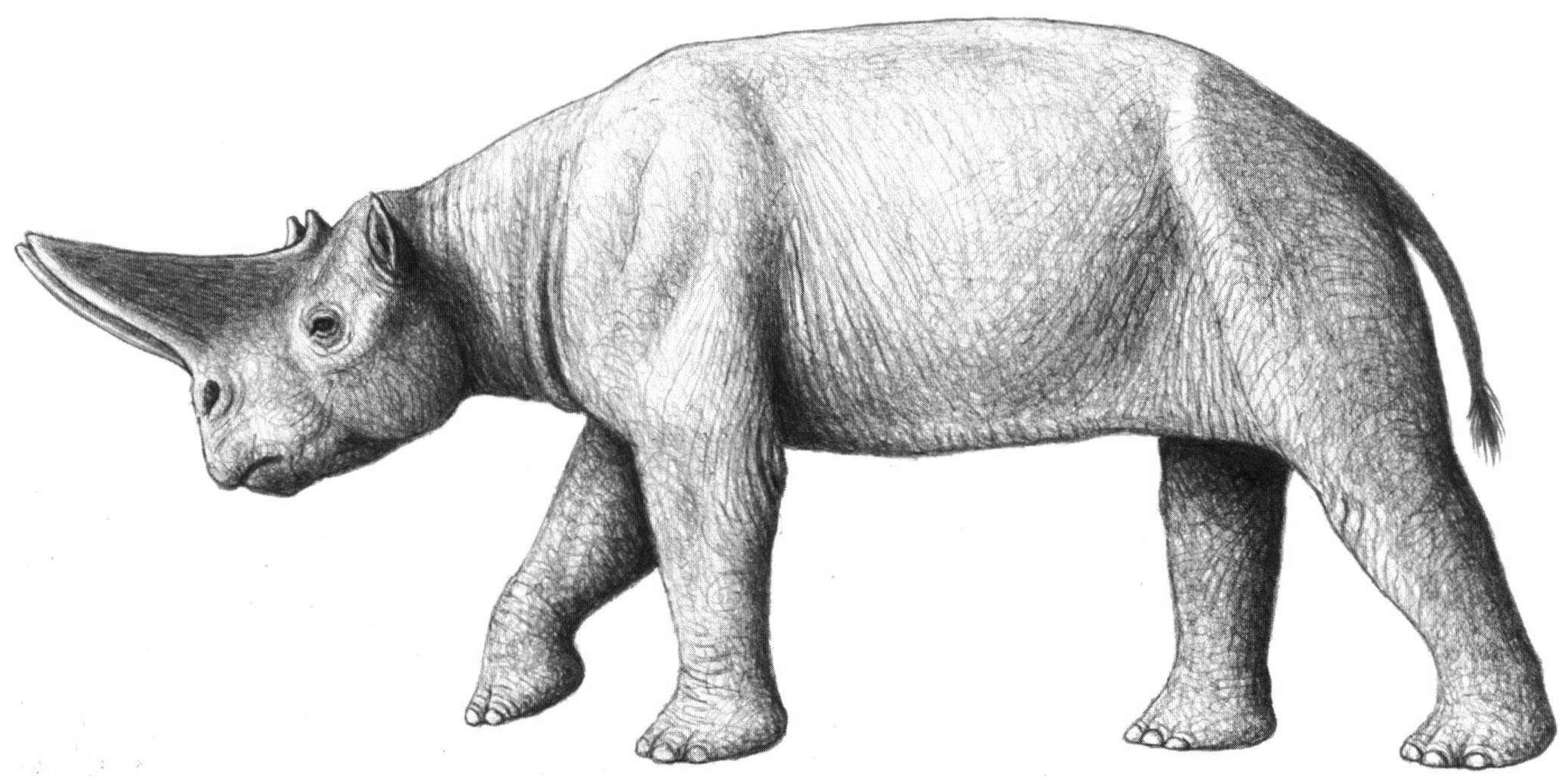
Arsinoitherium, a rhino-like embrithopod

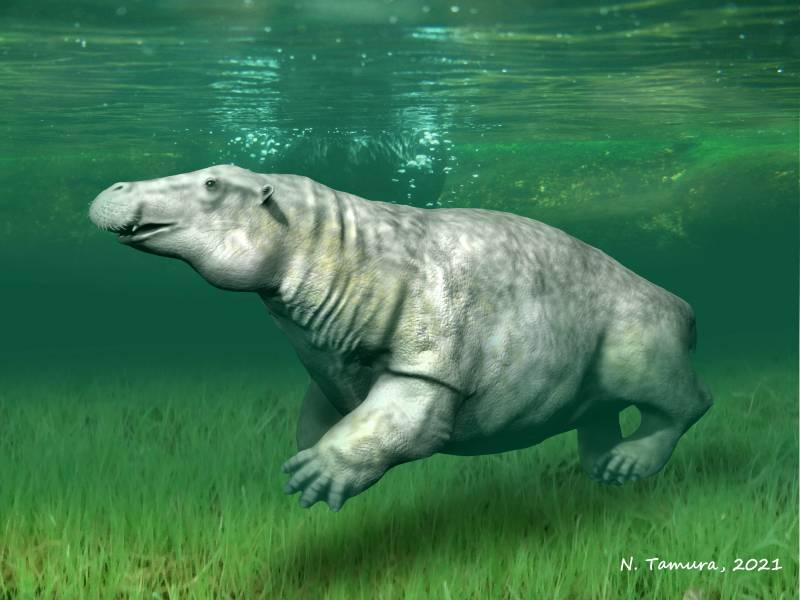
Desmostylus, a member of desmostylia, the only extinct order of marine mammals.

== Extinct orders ==
Each of the extinct orders, the Embrithopoda and Desmostylia, was as unique in its members' ways of making a living as the three orders that survive. Embrithopods were rhinoceros-like herbivorous mammals with plantigrade feet, and desmostylians were hippopotamus-like amphibious animals. Their walking posture and diet have been the subject of speculation, but tooth wear indicates that desmostylians browsed on terrestrial plants and had a posture similar to other large hoofed mammals.

== See also ==
- Altungulata
- Meridiungulata

== Sources ==
- Kleinschmidt, Traute; Czelusniak, John; Goodman, Morris; Braunitzer, Gerhard (1986). "Paenungulata: A comparison of the hemoglobin sequences from elephant, hyrax, and manatee" (PDF). Mol. Biol. Evol. 3 (5): 427–435. doi:10.1093/oxfordjournals.molbev.a040411. PMID 3444412. Archived from the original (PDF) on 30 June 2010.
- McKenna, M.C.; Bell, S.K., eds. (1997). Classification of Mammals above the Species Level. New York, NY: Columbia University Press. ISBN 0-231-11013-8.
- Seiffert, Erik; Guillon, J.M. (2007). "A new estimate of afrotherian phylogeny based on simultaneous analysis of genomic, morphological, and fossil evidence". BMC Evolutionary Biology. 7 (1): 13. Bibcode:2007BMCEE...7..224S. doi:10.1186/1471-2148-7-224. PMC 2248600. PMID 17999766.
- Simpson, G.G. (1945). "The principles of classification and a classification of mammals". American Museum of Natural History. 85: 1–350. hdl:2246/1104.
