= Evolution of the horse =

This image shows a representative sequence, but should not be construed to represent a "straight-line" evolution of the horse. Reconstruction, left forefoot skeleton (third digit emphasized yellow) and longitudinal section of molars of selected prehistoric horses

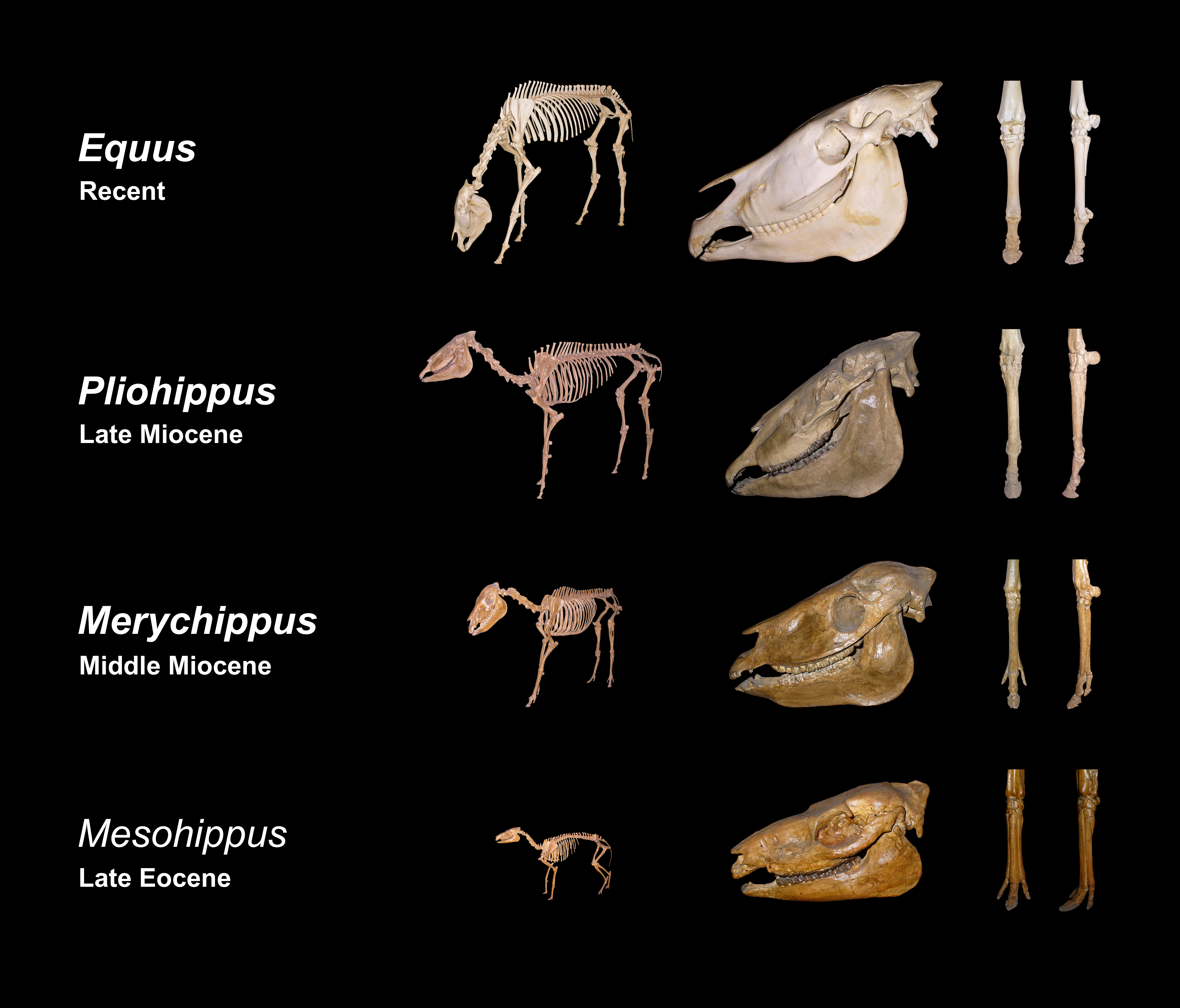
Skeletal evolution

The evolution of the horse, a mammal of the family Equidae, occurred over a geologic time scale of 50 million years, transforming the small, dog-sized, forest-dwelling Eohippus into the large, single-toed, modern-day horse. Paleozoologists have been able to piece together a more complete outline of the evolutionary lineage of the modern horse than of any other animal. Much of this evolution took place in North America, where horses originated but became extinct about 10,000 years ago, before being reintroduced in the 15th century.

The horse belongs to the order Perissodactyla (odd-toed ungulates), the members of which share hooved feet and an odd number of toes on each foot, as well as mobile upper lips and a similar tooth structure. This means that horses share a common ancestry with tapirs and rhinoceroses. The perissodactyls arose in the late Paleocene, less than 10 million years after the Cretaceous–Paleogene extinction event. This group of animals appears to have been originally specialized for life in tropical forests, but whereas tapirs and, to some extent, rhinoceroses, retained their jungle specializations, modern horses are adapted to life in the climatic conditions of the steppes, which are drier and much harsher than forests or jungles. Other species of Equus are adapted to a variety of intermediate conditions.

The early ancestors of the modern horse walked on several spread-out toes, an accommodation to life spent walking on the soft, moist ground of primeval forests. As grass species began to appear and flourish, the equids' diets shifted from foliage to silicate-rich grasses; the increased wear on teeth selected for increases in the size and durability of teeth. At the same time, as the steppes began to appear, selection favored increase in speed to outrun predators. This ability was attained by lengthening of limbs and the lifting of some toes from the ground in such a way that the weight of the body was gradually placed on one of the longest toes, the third.

== History of research ==
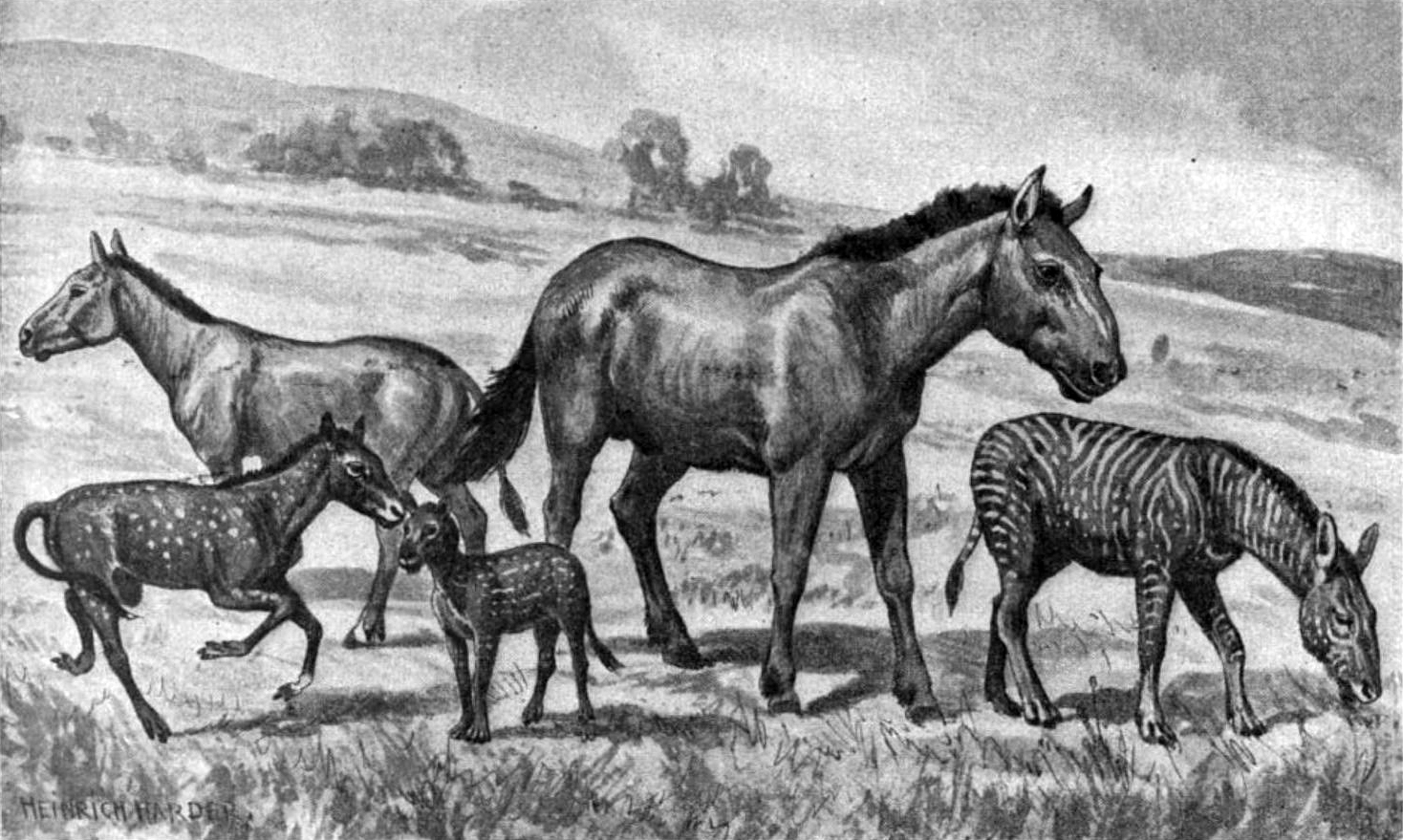
Extinct equids restored to scale. Left to right: Mesohippus, Neohipparion, Eohippus, Equus scotti and Hypohippus.

Wild horses have been known since prehistory from central Asia to Europe, with domestic horses and other equids being distributed more widely in the Old World, but no horses or equids of any type were found in the New World when European explorers reached the Americas. When the Spanish colonists brought domestic horses from Europe, beginning in 1493, escaped horses quickly established large feral herds. In the 1760s, the early naturalist Buffon suggested this was an indication of inferiority of the New World fauna, but later reconsidered this idea. William Clark's 1807 expedition to Big Bone Lick found "leg and foot bones of the Horses", which were included with other fossils sent to Thomas Jefferson and evaluated by the anatomist Caspar Wistar, but neither commented on the significance of this find.

The first Old World equid fossil was found in the gypsum quarries in Montmartre, Paris, in the 1820s. The tooth was sent to the Paris Conservatory, where it was identified by Georges Cuvier, who identified it as a browsing equine related to the tapir. His sketch of the entire animal matched later skeletons found at the site.

During the Beagle survey expedition, the young naturalist Charles Darwin had remarkable success with fossil hunting in Patagonia. On 10 October 1833, at Santa Fe, Argentina, he was "filled with astonishment" when he found a horse's tooth in the same stratum as fossil giant armadillos, and wondered if it might have been washed down from a later layer, but concluded this was "not very probable". After the expedition returned in 1836, the anatomist Richard Owen confirmed the tooth was from an extinct species, which he subsequently named Equus curvidens, and remarked, "This evidence of the former existence of a genus, which, as regards South America, had become extinct, and has a second time been introduced into that Continent, is not one of the least interesting fruits of Mr. Darwin's palæontological discoveries."

In 1848, a study On the fossil horses of America by Joseph Leidy systematically examined Pleistocene horse fossils from various collections, including that of the Academy of Natural Sciences, and concluded at least two ancient horse species had existed in North America: Equus curvidens and another, which he named Equus americanus. A decade later, however, he found the latter name had already been taken and renamed it Equus complicatus. In the same year, he visited Europe and was introduced by Owen to Darwin.

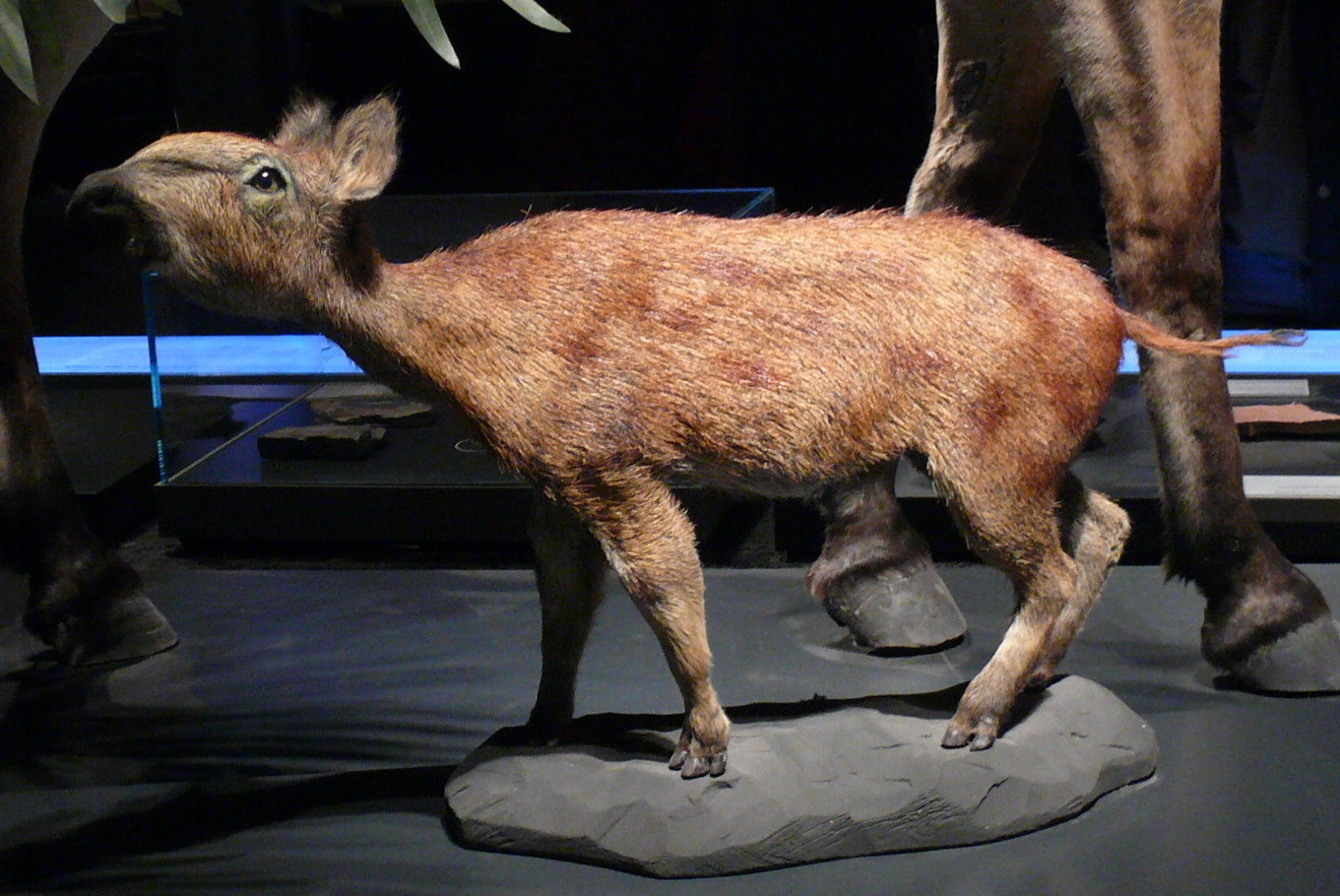
Restoration of Eurohippus parvulus, a mid- to late Eocene equid of Europe (Museum für Naturkunde, Berlin)

The original sequence of species believed to have evolved into the horse was based on fossils discovered in North America in 1879 by paleontologist Othniel Charles Marsh. The sequence, from Eohippus to the modern horse (Equus), was popularized by Thomas Huxley and became one of the most widely known examples of a clear evolutionary progression. The horse's evolutionary lineage became a common feature of biology textbooks, and the sequence of transitional fossils was assembled by the American Museum of Natural History into an exhibit that emphasized the gradual, "straight-line" evolution of the horse.

Since then, as the number of equid fossils has increased, the actual evolutionary progression from Eohippus to Equus has been discovered to be much more complex and multibranched than was initially supposed. The straight, direct progression from the former to the latter has been replaced by a more elaborate model with numerous branches in different directions, of which the modern horse is only one of many. George Gaylord Simpson in 1951 first recognized that the modern horse was not the "goal" of the entire lineage of equids, but is simply the only genus of the many horse lineages to survive.

Detailed fossil information on the distribution and rate of change of new equid species has also revealed that the progression between species was not as smooth and consistent as was once believed. Although some transitions, such as that of Dinohippus to Equus, were indeed gradual progressions, a number of others, such as that of Epihippus to Mesohippus, were relatively abrupt in geologic time, taking place over only a few million years. Both anagenesis (gradual change in an entire population's gene frequency) and cladogenesis (a population "splitting" into two distinct evolutionary branches) occurred, and many species coexisted with "ancestor" species at various times. The change in equids' traits was also not always a "straight line" from Eohippus to Equus: some traits reversed themselves at various points in the evolution of new equid species, such as size and the presence of facial fossae, and only in retrospect can certain evolutionary trends be recognized.

== Before odd-toed ungulates ==
=== Phenacodontidae ===
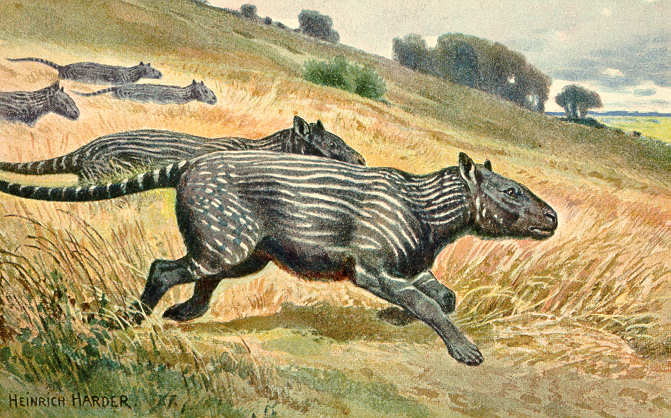
Restoration of Phenacodus

Phenacodontidae is the most recent family in the order Condylarthra believed to be ancestral to the odd-toed ungulates. It contains the genera Almogaver, Copecion, Ectocion, Eodesmatodon, Meniscotherium, Ordathspidotherium, Phenacodus and Pleuraspidotherium. The family lived from the Early Paleocene to the Middle Eocene in Europe and were about the size of a sheep, with tails making slightly less than half of the length of their bodies and, unlike their ancestors, good running skills.

== Eocene and Oligocene: early equids ==
=== Eohippus ===
Eohippus appeared in the Ypresian (early Eocene), about 52 mya (million years ago). It was an animal approximately the size of a fox (250–450 mm in height), with a relatively short head and neck and a springy, arched back. It had 44 low-crowned teeth, in the typical arrangement of an omnivorous, browsing mammal: three incisors, one canine, four premolars, and three molars on each side of the jaw. Its molars were uneven, dull, and bumpy, and used primarily for grinding foliage. The cusps of the molars were slightly connected in low crests. Eohippus browsed on soft foliage and fruit, probably scampering between thickets in the mode of a modern muntjac. It had a small brain, and possessed especially small frontal lobes.

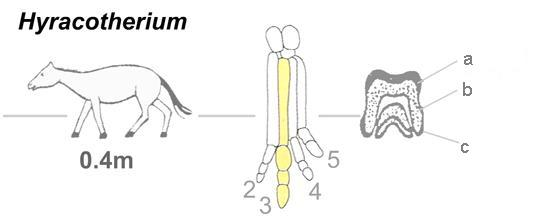
Eohippus, with left forefoot (third metacarpal colored) and tooth (a, enamel; b, dentin; c, cement) detailed

Its limbs were long relative to its body, already showing the beginnings of adaptations for running. However, all of the major leg bones were unfused, leaving the legs flexible and rotatable. Its wrist and hock joints were low to the ground. The forelimbs had five toes, of which four were equipped with small proto-hooves; the large fifth "toe-thumb" was off the ground. The hind limbs had small hooves on three out of the five toes, whereas the vestigial first and fifth toes did not touch the ground. Its feet were padded, much like a dog's, but with the small hooves in place of claws.

For a span of about 20 million years, Eohippus thrived with few significant evolutionary changes. The most significant change was in the teeth, which began to adapt to its changing diet, as these early Equidae shifted from a mixed diet of fruits and foliage to one focused increasingly on browsing foods. During the Eocene, an Eohippus species (most likely Eohippus angustidens) branched out into various new types of Equidae. Thousands of complete, fossilized skeletons of these animals have been found in the Eocene layers of North American strata, mainly in the Wind River basin in Wyoming. Similar fossils have also been discovered in Europe, such as Propalaeotherium (which is not considered ancestral to the modern horse).

=== Orohippus ===
Approximately 50 million years ago, in the early-to-middle Eocene, Eohippus smoothly transitioned into Orohippus through a gradual series of changes. Although its name means "mountain horse", Orohippus was not a true horse and did not live in the mountains. It resembled Eohippus in size, but had a slimmer body, an elongated head, slimmer forelimbs, and longer hind legs, all of which are characteristics of a good jumper. Although Orohippus was still pad-footed, the vestigial outer toes of Eohippus were not present in Orohippus; there were four toes on each fore leg, and three on each hind leg.

The most dramatic change between Eohippus and Orohippus was in the teeth: the first of the premolar teeth was dwarfed, the last premolar shifted in shape and function into a molar, and the crests on the teeth became more pronounced. Both of these factors increased the grinding ability of the teeth of Orohippus; the change suggest selection imposed by increased toughness of Orohippus plant diet.

=== Epihippus ===
In the mid-Eocene, about 47 million years ago, Epihippus, a genus which continued the evolutionary trend of increasingly efficient grinding teeth, evolved from Orohippus. Epihippus had five grinding, low-crowned cheek teeth with well-formed crests. A late species of Epihippus, sometimes referred to as Duchesnehippus intermedius, had teeth similar to Oligocene equids, although slightly less developed. Whether Duchesnehippus was a subgenus of Epihippus or a distinct genus is disputed. Epihippus was only 2 feet tall.

=== Mesohippus ===
In the late Eocene and the early stages of the Oligocene epoch (32–24 mya), the climate of North America became drier, and the earliest grasses began to evolve. The forests were yielding to flatlands, home to grasses and various kinds of brush. In a few areas, these plains were covered in sand, creating the type of environment resembling the present-day prairies.

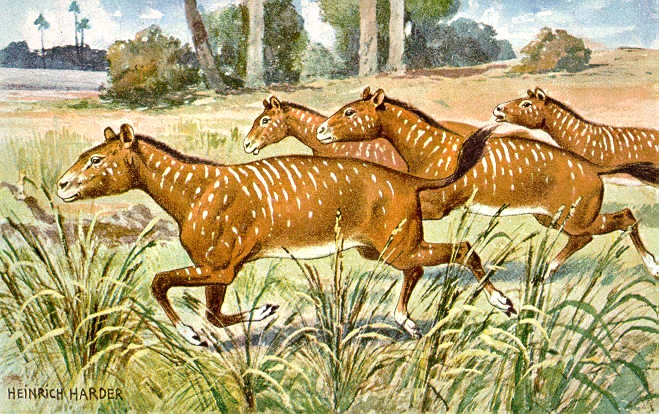
Restoration of Mesohippus

In response to the changing environment, the then-living species of Equidae also began to change. In the late Eocene, they began developing tougher teeth and becoming slightly larger and leggier, allowing for faster running speeds in open areas, and thus for evading predators in nonwooded areas. About 40 mya, Mesohippus ("middle horse") suddenly developed in response to strong new selective pressures to adapt, beginning with the species Mesohippus celer and soon followed by Mesohippus westoni.

In the early Oligocene, Mesohippus was one of the more widespread mammals in North America. It walked on three toes on each of its front and hind feet (the first and fifth toes remained, but were small and not used in walking). The third toe was stronger than the outer ones, and thus more weighted; the fourth front toe was diminished to a vestigial nub. Judging by its longer and slimmer limbs, Mesohippus was an agile animal.

Mesohippus was slightly larger than Epihippus, about 610 mm (24 in) at the shoulder. Its back was less arched, and its face, snout, and neck were somewhat longer. It had significantly larger cerebral hemispheres, and had a small, shallow depression on its skull called a fossa, which in modern horses is quite detailed. The fossa serves as a useful marker for identifying an equine fossil's species. Mesohippus had six grinding "cheek teeth", with a single premolar in front—a trait all descendant Equidae would retain. Mesohippus also had the sharp tooth crests of Epihippus, improving its ability to grind down tough vegetation.

=== Miohippus ===
Around 36 million years ago, soon after the development of Mesohippus, Miohippus ("lesser horse") emerged, the earliest species being Miohippus assiniboiensis. As with Mesohippus, the appearance of Miohippus was relatively abrupt, though a few transitional fossils linking the two genera have been found. Mesohippus was once believed to have anagenetically evolved into Miohippus by a gradual series of progressions, but new evidence has shown its evolution was cladogenetic: a Miohippus population split off from the main genus Mesohippus, coexisted with Mesohippus for around four million years, and then over time came to replace Mesohippus.

Miohippus was significantly larger than its predecessors, and its ankle joints had subtly changed. Its facial fossa was larger and deeper, and it also began to show a variable extra crest in its upper cheek teeth, a trait that became a characteristic feature of equine teeth.

Miohippus ushered in a major new period of diversification in Equidae.

== Miocene and Pliocene: true equines ==
=== Kalobatippus ===
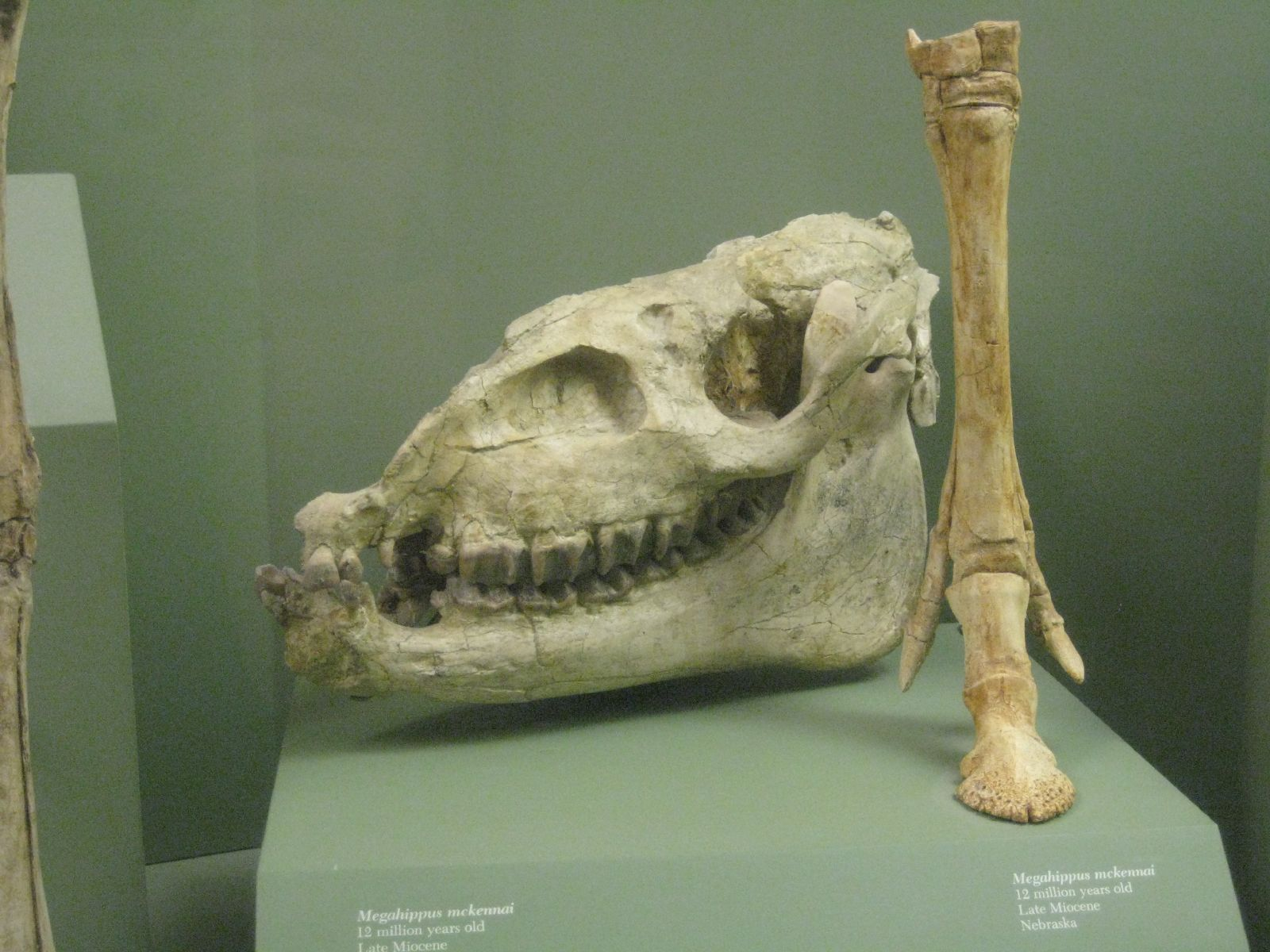
Fossil Megahippus mckennai

The forest-suited form was Kalobatippus (or Miohippus intermedius, depending on whether it was a new genus or species), whose second and fourth front toes were long, well-suited to travel on the soft forest floors. Kalobatippus probably gave rise to Anchitherium, which travelled to Asia via the Bering Strait land bridge, and from there to Europe. In both North America and Eurasia, larger-bodied genera evolved from Anchitherium: Sinohippus in Eurasia and Hypohippus and Megahippus in North America. Hypohippus became extinct by the late Miocene.

=== Parahippus ===
The Miohippus population that remained on the steppes is believed to be ancestral to Parahippus, a North American animal about the size of a small pony, with a prolonged skull and a facial structure resembling the horses of today. Its third toe was stronger and larger, and carried the main weight of the body. Its four premolars resembled the molar teeth; the first were small and almost nonexistent. The incisor teeth, like those of its predecessors, had a crown (like human incisors); however, the top incisors had a trace of a shallow crease marking the beginning of the core/cup.

=== Merychippus ===
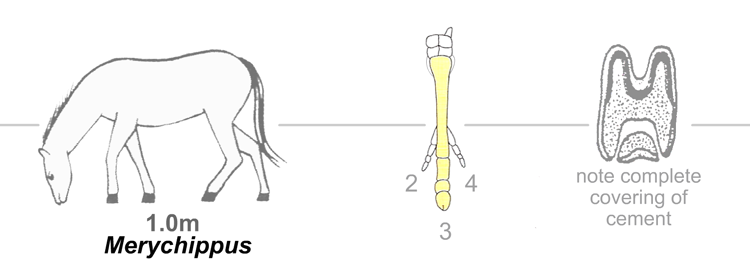
Merychippus, an effective grazer and runner

In the middle of the Miocene epoch, the grazer Merychippus flourished. It had wider molars than its predecessors, which are believed to have been used for crunching the hard grasses of the steppes. The hind legs, which were relatively short, had side toes equipped with small hooves, but they probably only touched the ground when running. Merychippus radiated into at least 19 additional grassland species.

=== Hipparion ===
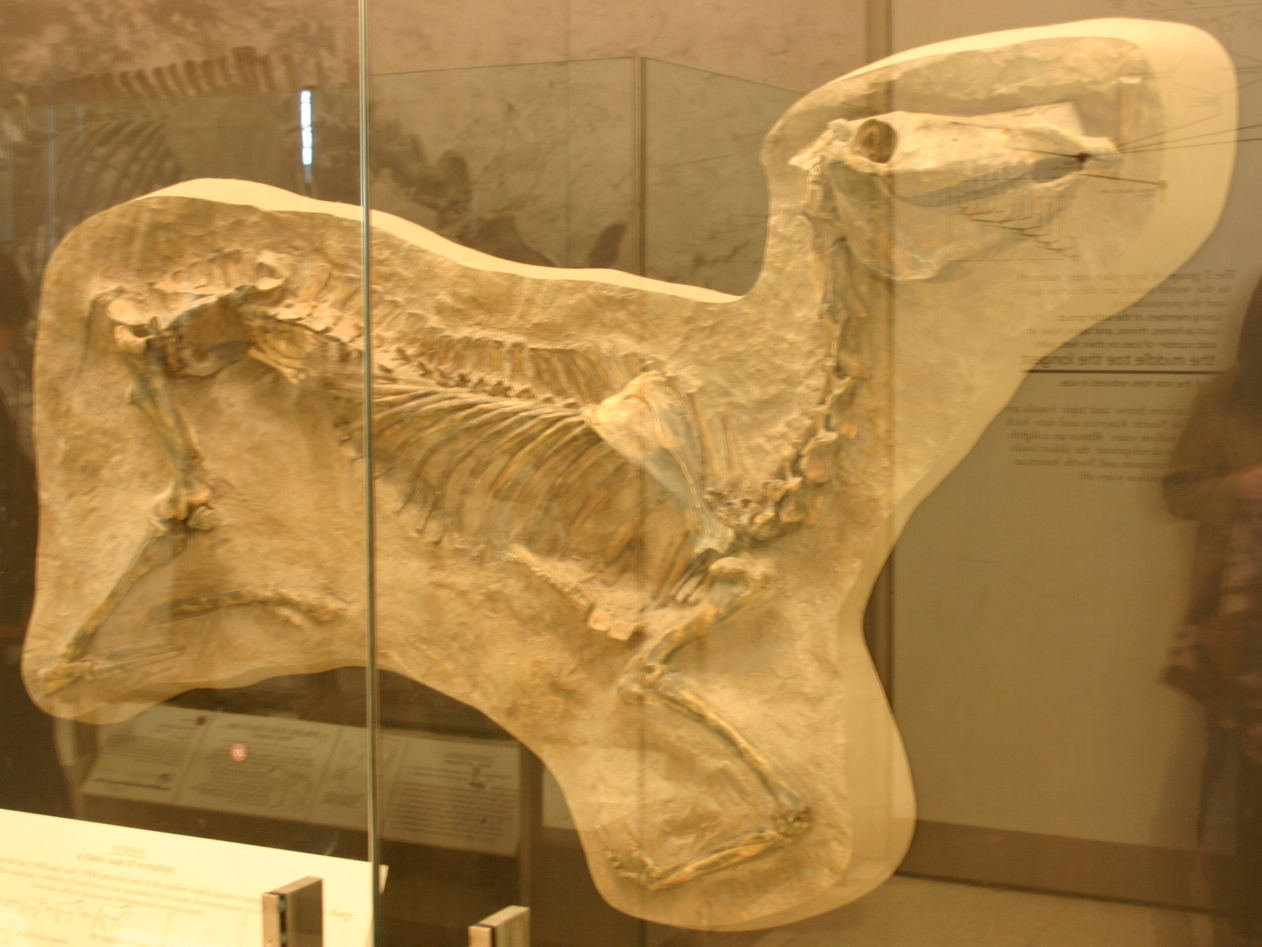
Protohippus simus

Three lineages within Equidae are believed to be descended from the numerous varieties of Merychippus: Hipparion, Protohippus and Pliohippus. The most different from Merychippus was Hipparion, mainly in the structure of tooth enamel: in comparison with other Equidae, the inside, or tongue side, had a completely isolated parapet. A complete and well-preserved skeleton of the North American Hipparion shows an animal the size of a small pony. They were very slim, rather like antelopes, and were adapted to life on dry prairies. On its slim legs, Hipparion had three toes equipped with small hooves, but the side toes did not touch the ground.

In North America, Hipparion and its relatives (Cormohipparion, Nannippus, Neohipparion, and Pseudhipparion), proliferated into many kinds of equids, at least one of which managed to migrate to Asia and Europe during the Miocene epoch. (European Hipparion differs from American Hipparion in its smaller body size – the best-known discovery of these fossils was near Athens.)

=== Pliohippus ===
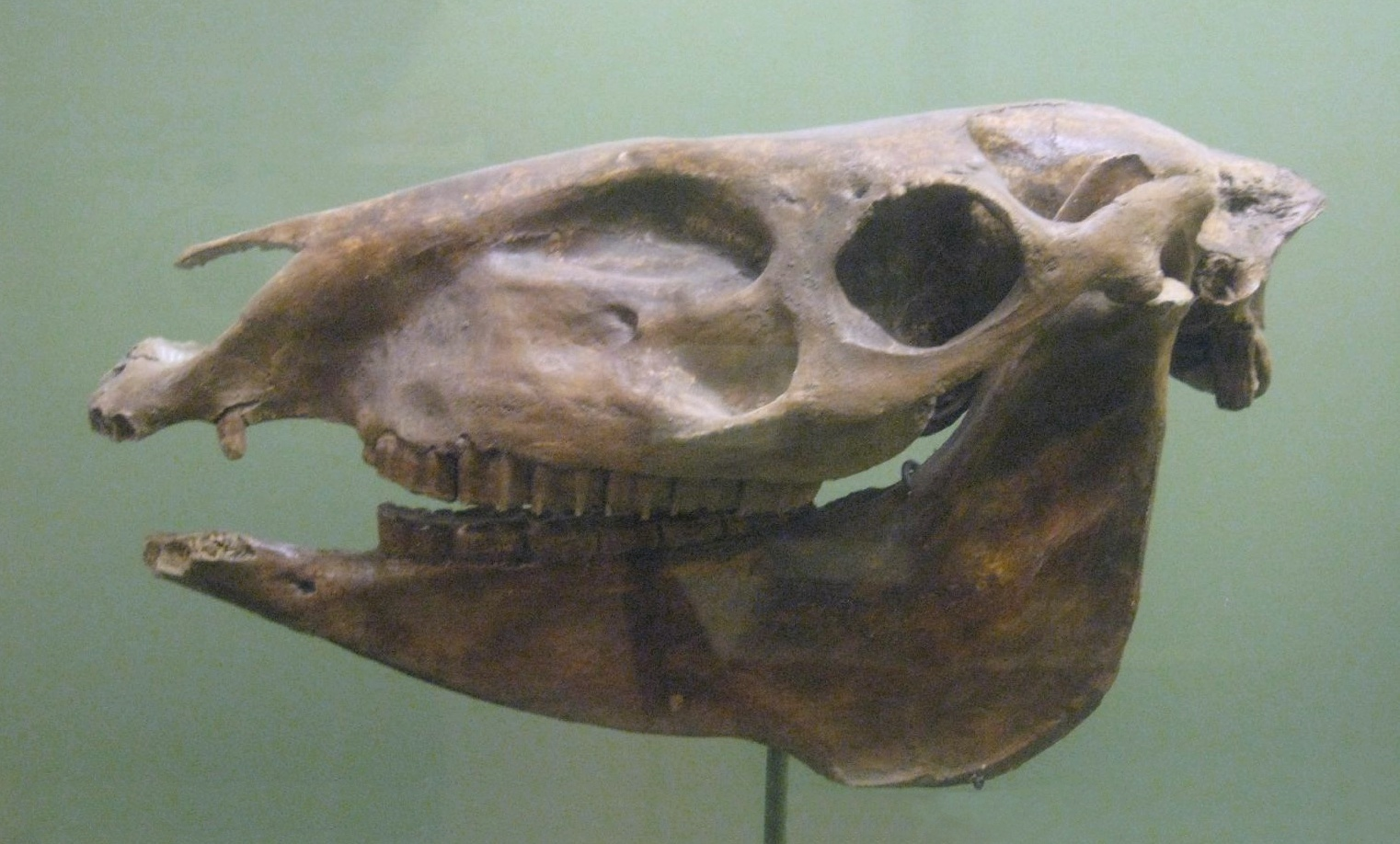
Pliohippus pernix

Pliohippus arose from Callippus in the middle Miocene, around 12 mya. It was very similar in appearance to Equus, though it had two long extra toes on both sides of the hoof, externally barely visible as callused stubs. The long and slim limbs of Pliohippus reveal a quick-footed steppe animal.

Until recently, Pliohippus was believed to be the ancestor of present-day horses because of its many anatomical similarities. However, though Pliohippus was clearly a close relative of Equus, its skull had deep facial fossae, whereas Equus had no fossae at all. Additionally, its teeth were strongly curved, unlike the very straight teeth of modern horses. Consequently, it is unlikely to be the ancestor of the modern horse; instead, it is a likely candidate for the ancestor of Astrohippus.

=== Dinohippus ===
Dinohippus was the most common species of Equidae in North America during the late Pliocene. It was originally thought to be monodactyl, but a 1981 fossil find in Nebraska shows some were tridactyl.

=== Plesippus ===
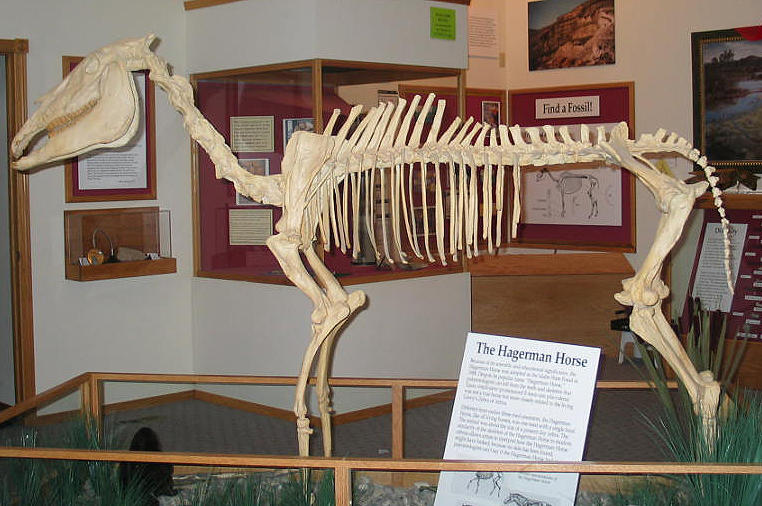
Mounted skeleton of Hagerman horse (Equus simplicidens)

Plesippus is often considered an intermediate stage between Dinohippus and the extant genus, Equus.

The famous fossils found near Hagerman, Idaho, were originally thought to be a part of the genus Plesippus. Hagerman Fossil Beds (Idaho) is a Pliocene site, dating to about 3.5 mya. The fossilized remains were originally called Plesippus shoshonensis, but further study by paleontologists determined the fossils represented the oldest remains of the genus Equus. Their estimated average weight was 425 kg, roughly the size of an Arabian horse.

At the end of the Pliocene, the climate in North America began to cool significantly and most of the animals were forced to move south. One population of Plesippus moved across the Bering land bridge into Eurasia around 2.5 mya.

== Modern horses ==
=== Equus ===
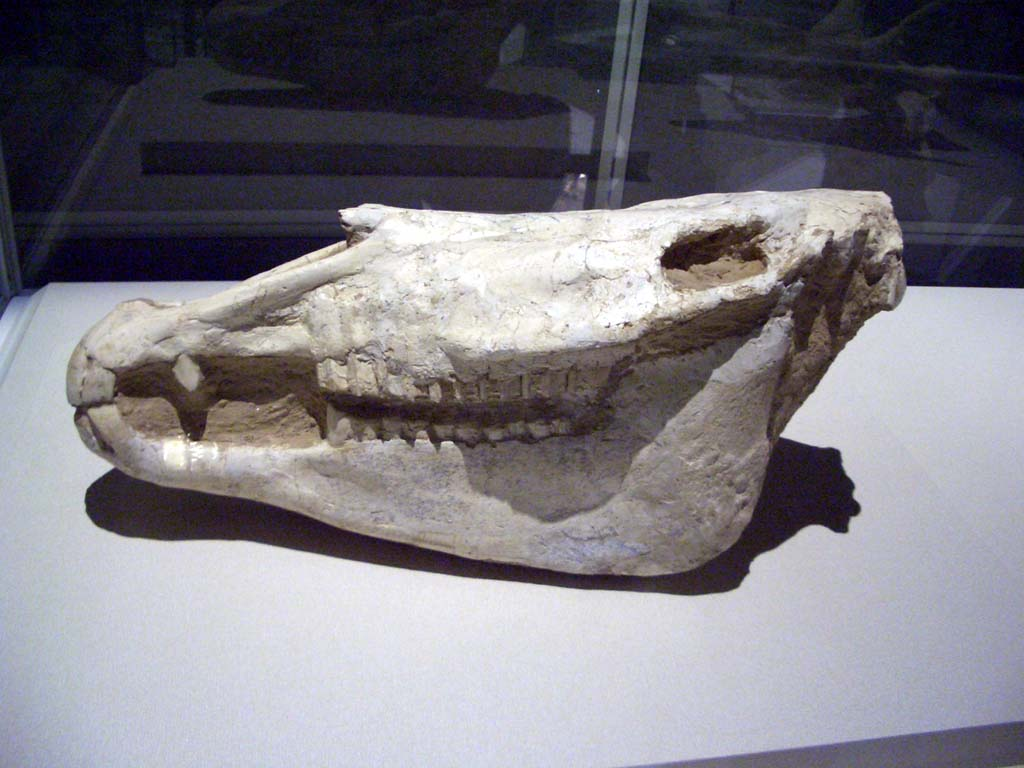
Skull of a giant extinct horse, Equus eisenmannae

The genus Equus, which includes all extant equines, is believed to have evolved from Dinohippus, via the intermediate form Plesippus. One of the oldest species is Equus simplicidens, described as zebra-like with a donkey-shaped head. The oldest fossil to date is ~3.5 million years old, discovered in Idaho. The genus appears to have spread quickly into the Old World, with the similarly aged Equus livenzovensis documented from western Europe and Russia.

Molecular phylogenies indicate the most recent common ancestor of all modern equids (members of the genus Equus) lived ~5.6 (3.9–7.8) mya. Direct paleogenomic sequencing of a 700,000-year-old middle Pleistocene horse metapodial bone from Canada implies a more recent 4.07 Myr before present date for the most recent common ancestor (MRCA) within the range of 4.0 to 4.5 Myr BP. The oldest divergencies are the Asian hemiones (subgenus E. (Asinus), including the kulan, onager, and kiang), followed by the African zebras (subgenera E. (Dolichohippus), and E. (Hippotigris)). All other modern forms including the domesticated horse (and many fossil Pliocene and Pleistocene forms) belong to the subgenus E. (Equus) which diverged ~4.8 (3.2–6.5) million years ago.

Pleistocene horse fossils have been assigned to a multitude of species, with over 50 species of equines described from the Pleistocene of North America alone, although the taxonomic validity of most of these has been called into question. Recent genetic work on fossils has found evidence for only three genetically divergent equid lineages in Pleistocene North and South America. These results suggest all North American fossils of caballine-type horses (which also include the domesticated horse and Przewalski's horse of Europe and Asia), as well as South American fossils traditionally placed in the subgenus E. (Amerhippus) belong to the same species: E. ferus. Remains attributed to a variety of species and lumped as New World stilt-legged horses (including Haringtonhippus, E. tau, E. quinni and potentially North American Pleistocene fossils previously attributed to E. cf. hemiones, and E. (Asinus) cf. kiang) probably all belong to a second species endemic to North America, which despite a superficial resemblance to species in the subgenus E. (Asinus) (and hence occasionally referred to as North American ass) is closely related to E. ferus. Surprisingly, the third species, endemic to South America and traditionally referred to as Hippidion, originally believed to be descended from Pliohippus, was shown to be a third species in the genus Equus, closely related to the New World stilt-legged horse. The temporal and regional variation in body size and morphological features within each lineage indicates extraordinary intraspecific plasticity. Such environment-driven adaptative changes would explain why the taxonomic diversity of Pleistocene equids has been overestimated on morphoanatomical grounds.

According to these results, it appears the genus Equus evolved from a Dinohippus-like ancestor ~4–7 mya. It rapidly spread into the Old World and there diversified into the various species of asses and zebras. A North American lineage of the subgenus E. (Equus) evolved into the New World stilt-legged horse (NWSLH). Subsequently, populations of this species entered South America as part of the Great American Interchange shortly after the formation of the Isthmus of Panama, and evolved into the form currently referred to as Hippidion ~2.5 million years ago. Hippidion is thus only distantly related to the morphologically similar Pliohippus, which presumably became extinct during the Miocene. Both the NWSLH and Hippidium show adaptations to dry, barren ground, whereas the shortened legs of Hippidion may have been a response to sloped terrain. In contrast, the geographic origin of the closely related modern E. ferus is not resolved. However, genetic results on extant and fossil material of Pleistocene age indicate two clades, potentially subspecies, one of which had a holarctic distribution spanning from Europe through Asia and across North America and would become the founding stock of the modern domesticated horse. The other population appears to have been restricted to North America. However, one or more North American populations of E. ferus entered South America ~1.0–1.5 million years ago, leading to the forms currently known as E. (Amerhippus), which represent an extinct geographic variant or race of E. ferus.

=== Genome sequencing ===
Early sequencing studies of DNA revealed several genetic characteristics of Przewalski's horse that differ from what is seen in modern domestic horses, indicating neither is ancestor of the other, and supporting the status of Przewalski horses as a remnant wild population not derived from domestic horses. The evolutionary divergence of the two populations was estimated to have occurred about 45,000 YBP, while the archaeological record places the first horse domestication about 5,500 YBP by the ancient central-Asian Botai culture. The two lineages thus split well before domestication, probably due to climate, topography, or other environmental changes.

Several subsequent DNA studies produced partially contradictory results. A 2009 molecular analysis using ancient DNA recovered from archaeological sites placed Przewalski's horse in the middle of the domesticated horses, but a 2011 mitochondrial DNA analysis suggested that Przewalski's and modern domestic horses diverged some 160,000 years ago. An analysis based on whole genome sequencing and calibration with DNA from old horse bones gave a divergence date of 38–72 thousand years ago.

In June 2013, a group of researchers announced that they had sequenced the DNA of a 560–780 thousand year old horse, using material extracted from a leg bone found buried in permafrost in Canada's Yukon territory. Before this publication, the oldest nuclear genome that had been successfully sequenced was dated at 110–130 thousand years ago. For comparison, the researchers also sequenced the genomes of a 43,000-year-old Pleistocene horse, a Przewalski's horse, five modern horse breeds, and a donkey. Analysis of differences between these genomes indicated that the last common ancestor of modern horses, donkeys, and zebras existed 4 to 4.5 million years ago. The results also indicated that Przewalski's horse diverged from other modern types of horse about 43,000 years ago, and had never in its evolutionary history been domesticated.

A new analysis in 2018 involved genomic sequencing of ancient DNA from mid-fourth-millennium B.C.E. Botai domestic horses, as well as domestic horses from more recent archaeological sites, and comparison of these genomes with those of modern domestic and Przewalski's horses. The study revealed that Przewalski's horses not only belong to the same genetic lineage as those from the Botai culture, but were the feral descendants of these ancient domestic animals, rather than representing a surviving population of never-domesticated horses. The Botai horses were found to have made only negligible genetic contribution to any of the other ancient or modern domestic horses studied, which must then have arisen from an independent domestication involving a different wild horse population.

The karyotype of Przewalski's horse differs from that of the domestic horse by an extra chromosome pair because of the fission of domestic horse chromosome 5 to produce the Przewalski's horse chromosomes 23 and 24. In comparison, the chromosomal differences between domestic horses and zebras include numerous translocations, fusions, inversions and centromere repositioning. This gives Przewalski's horse the highest diploid chromosome number among all equine species. They can interbreed with the domestic horse and produce fertile offspring (65 chromosomes).

=== Pleistocene extinctions ===
Digs in western Canada have unearthed clear evidence horses existed in North America until about 12,000 years ago. However, all Equidae in North America ultimately became extinct in the Late Pleistocene extinctions, simultaneous with the extinctions of a variety of other American megafauna, while other species like Bison have survived there. The causes of this extinction are a matter of debate. Given the suddenness of the event and because these mammals had been flourishing for millions of years previously, something quite unusual must have happened. The first main hypothesis attributes extinction to climate change. For example, in Alaska, beginning approximately 12,500 years ago, the grasses characteristic of a steppe ecosystem gave way to shrub tundra, which was covered with unpalatable plants. The other hypothesis suggests extinction was linked to overexploitation by newly arrived humans of naive prey that were not habituated to their hunting methods. The extinctions were roughly simultaneous with the end of the most recent glacial advance and the appearance of the big-game hunting Clovis culture. Several studies have indicated humans probably arrived in Alaska before or shortly before the local extinction of horses. It has been proposed that the steppe–tundra vegetation transition in Beringia may have been a consequence, rather than a cause, of the extinction of megafaunal grazers.

In Eurasia, horse fossils began occurring frequently again in archaeological sites in Kazakhstan and the southern Ukraine about 6,000 years ago. From then on, domesticated horses, as well as the knowledge of capturing, taming, and rearing horses, probably spread relatively quickly, with wild mares from several wild populations being incorporated en route.

=== Return to the Americas ===
Horses only returned to the Americas with Christopher Columbus in 1493. These were Iberian horses first brought to Hispaniola and later to Panama, Mexico, Brazil, Peru, Argentina, and, in 1538, Florida. The first horses to return to the main continent were 17 horses brought by the expedition of Hernán Cortés in 1519. Subsequent explorers, such as Coronado and De Soto, brought ever-larger numbers, some from Spain and others from breeding establishments set up by the Spanish in the Caribbean. Later, as Spanish missions were founded on the mainland, horses would eventually be lost or stolen, and proliferated into large herds of feral horses that became known as mustangs.

== Details ==
=== Toes ===
The ancestors of the horse came to walk only on the end of the third toe and both side (second and fourth) "toes". Skeletal remnants show obvious wear on the back of both sides of metacarpal and metatarsal bones, commonly called the "splint bones". They are the remnants of the second and the fourth toes. Modern horses retain the splint bones; they are often believed to be useless attachments, but they in fact play an important role in supporting the carpal joints (front knees) and even the tarsal joints (hocks).

A 2018 study has found remnants of the remaining digits in the horse's hoof, suggesting a retention of all five digits (albeit in an "hourglass" arrangement where metacarpals/tarsals are present proximally and phalanges distally).

=== Teeth ===
Throughout the phylogenetic development, the teeth of the horse underwent significant changes. The type of the original omnivorous teeth with short, "bumpy" molars, with which the prime members of the evolutionary line distinguished themselves, gradually changed into the teeth common to herbivorous mammals. They became long (as much as 100 mm), roughly cubical molars equipped with flat grinding surfaces. In conjunction with the teeth, during the horse's evolution, the elongation of the facial part of the skull is apparent, and can also be observed in the backward-set eyeholes. In addition, the relatively short neck of the equine ancestors became longer, with equal elongation of the legs. Finally, the size of the body grew as well.

=== Coat color ===
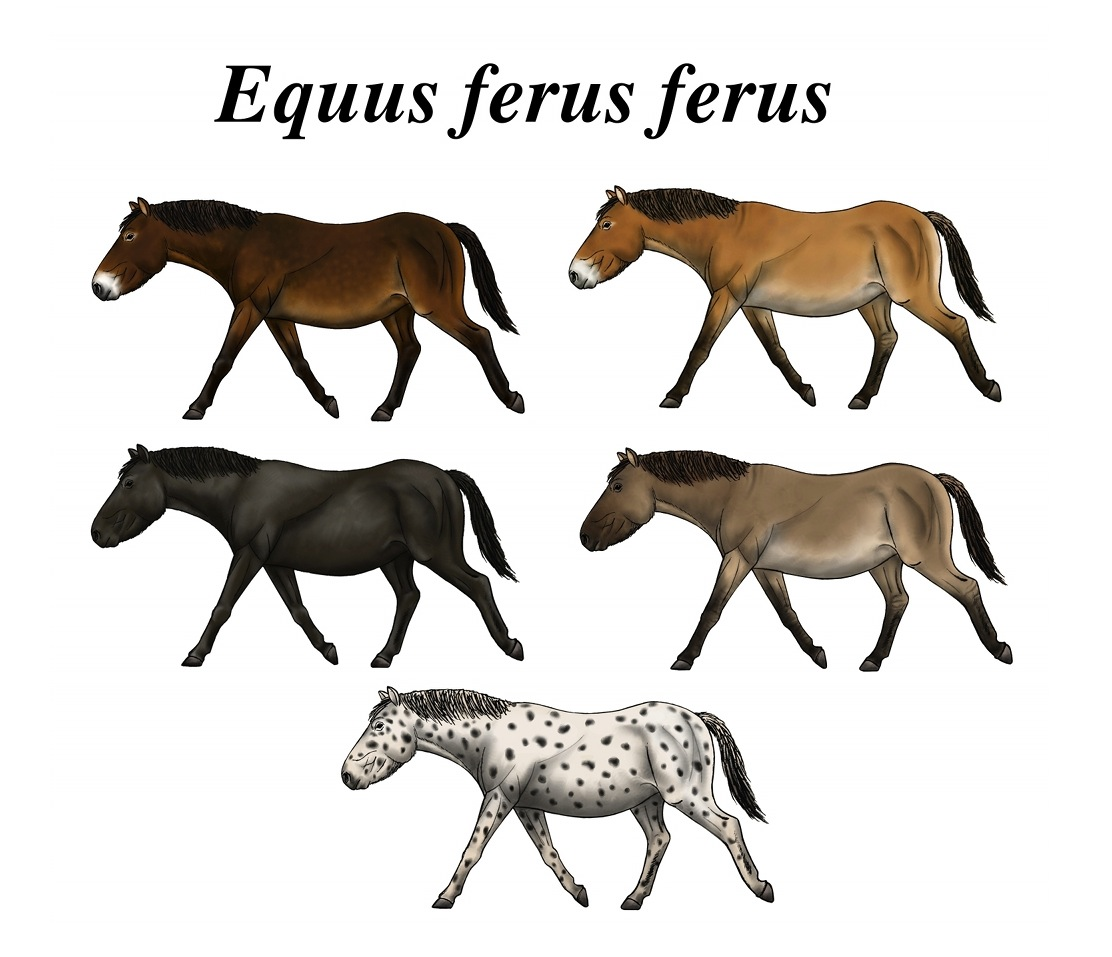
Reconstruction of possible ancestral coat colors.

The ancestral coat color of E. ferus was possibly a uniform dun, consistent with modern populations of Przewalski's horses. Pre-domestication variants including black and spotted have been inferred from cave wall paintings and confirmed by genomic analysis. Domestication may have also led to more varieties of coat colors.

== See also ==
- Evidence of common descent
- Equus gallicus
- List of Perissodactyla taxa
- List of horse breeds
