= Olbitherium =

Olbitherium Temporal range: Early Eocene 55–48 Ma

Scientific classification
- Kingdom: Animalia
- Phylum: Chordata
- Class: Mammalia
- Order: Perissodactyla
- Genus: †Olbitherium; Tong et al., 2004

Type species
- Olbitherium millenariusum

Extinct order of mammals

Olbitherium is an extinct mammal of the order Perissodactyla (an early ancestor of modern-day horses, rhinos, and tapirs) from the early Eocene epoch of Shandong, China.

== Description and classification ==
Olbitherium was originally described from lower and upper jaw fragments and several teeth found in the Wutu Formation of Shandong Province. The limited material of Olbitherium shares similarities with several ungulate groups. According to Tong et al., the upper cheek teeth show similarities to early Perissodactyls, as well as the hyracoid Seggeurius, while the lower cheek teeth more closely resemble those of phenacodontids, such as Ectocion, Phenacodus, and Copecion. Due to these conflicting similarities, Tong et al. placed Olbitherium as incertae sedis within the Phenacodonta, a grouping of Perissodactyla, "Condylarthra", and Hyracoidea in McKenna's 1975 classification, and suggested that Olbitherium represents an intermediate stage in the evolution of perissodactyls from Phenacodus-like ancestors. In 2010, a skull and post-cranial remains were described, and Olbitherium was assigned to the Perissodactyla, closely related to basal members of the extinct family Isectolophidae such as Homogalax and Cardiolophus.

== See also ==
- Evolution of horses
