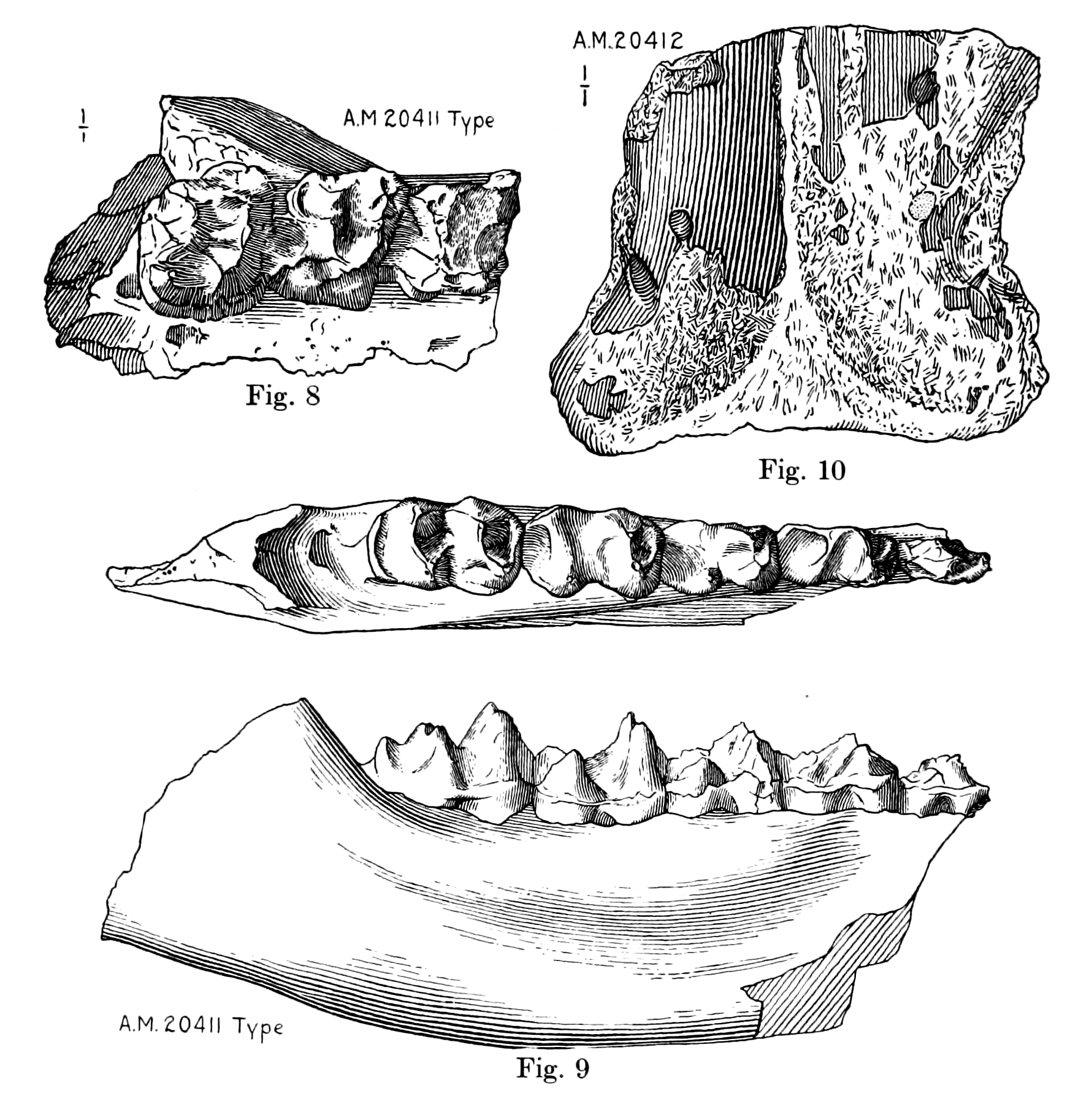
- Dentary material of P. fallax

Scientific classification
- Kingdom: Animalia
- Phylum: Chordata
- Class: Mammalia
- Infraclass: Placentalia
- Genus: †Phenacolophus; Matthew & Granger, 1925

Species
- Phenacolophus fallax Matthew & Granger, 1925

= Phenacolophus =

Phenacolophus Temporal range: Late Paleocene–Early Eocene

Extinct genus of mammal

Phenacolophus is a genus of placental mammal of unknown taxonomic placement from Paleogene Mongolia.

== Description ==
Phenacolophus had lophodont molars with low crowns. In form, the lower molars have been compared to Eohippus. The premolars were smaller than the molars, and the canines were greatly enlarged.

== Classification ==
The classification history of Phenacolophus is convoluted. The describers of the genus, W. D. Matthew and Walter Granger, proposed that it was of condylarthrine affinity, as well as tentatively suggested Phenacolophus was a litoptern, though they admitted this placement was not likely. Other authors suggest Phenacolophus was a basal arsinoithere, based on shared derived characteristics. More recently, an altungulate classification has been supported. However, altungulates as a group are most likely not a real clade, so the true positioning of Phenacolophus is questionable. Some phylogenies still include it with the Embrithopoda (or as a sister clade), whilst others classify it as a stem perissodactyl.
