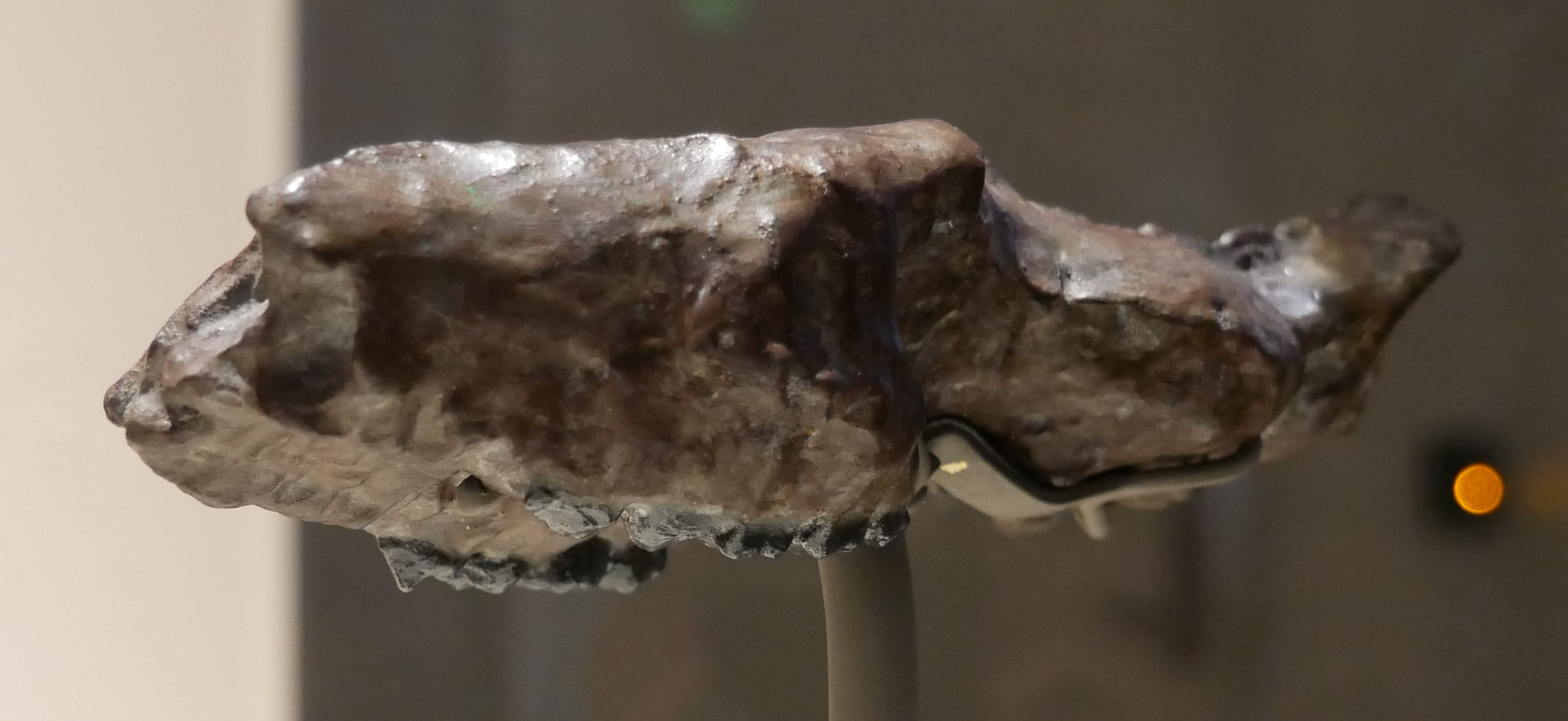
- Skull cast of Tetraclaenodon puercensis (NMMNH P 69898)

Scientific classification
- Kingdom: Animalia
- Phylum: Chordata
- Class: Mammalia
- Family: †Phenacodontidae
- Genus: †Tetraclaenodon; Scott, 1892

Type species
- Phenacodus puercensis Cope, 1881

Species
- †Tetraclaenodon puercensis (Cope, 1881); †Tetraclaenodon septentrionalis? Thewissen, 1990

Synonyms
- †Protogonia Cope, 1881; †Euprotogonia Cope, 1893

= Tetraclaenodon =

Tetraclaenodon Temporal range: Paleocene (Torrejonian - Tiffanian)

Extinct genus of mammals

Tetraclaenodon is an extinct genus of phenacodontid mammal from the Paleocene of North America. It is the oldest and least specialized member of Phenacodontidae, a family of small early ungulates (hoofed mammals). Its fossils were first reported from the Nacimiento Formation of New Mexico, though it was common and widely distributed across many western states. Compared to other phenacodontids, Tetraclaenodon was small and built for strength over speed. Its bunodont teeth, five-toed paws, and narrow hooves are more generalized than later members of its family.

A 2012 study positioned Tetraclaenodon as the basalmost member of the clade containing "Phenacodontidae" and Altungulata (a proposed grouping of perissodactyls and African ungulates). Most studies reject Altungulata as a natural grouping, though phenacodontids are still often considered close (or even ancestral) to perissodactyls.

== Description ==
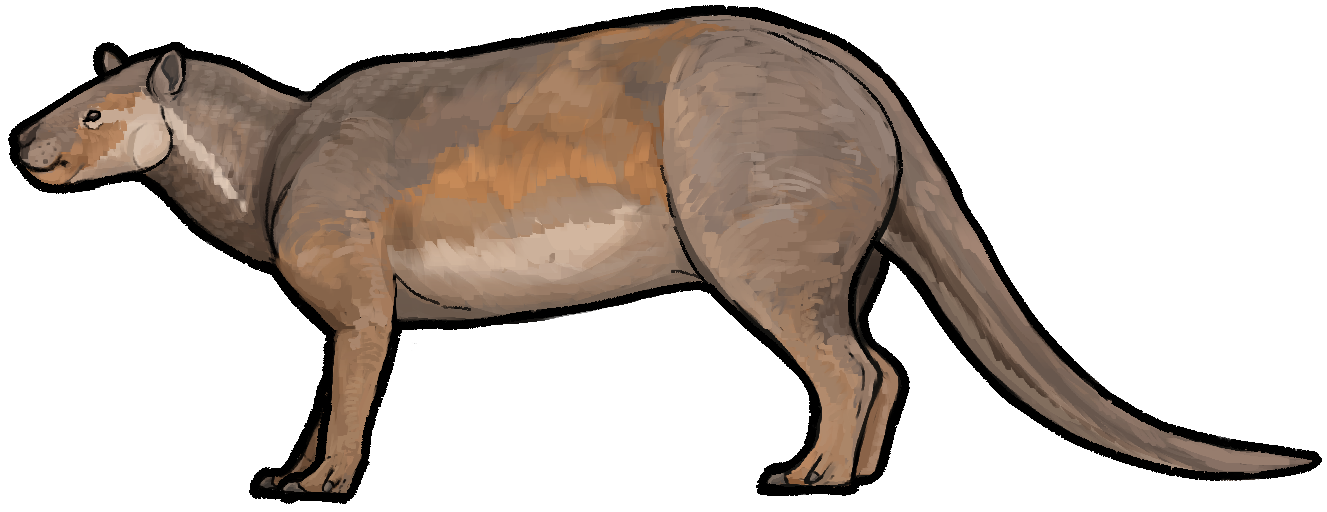
Life Restoration

Based on limb proportions, one subadult specimen of Tetraclaenodon had an estimated weight of 2.9–4.0 kg (6.4–8.8 lb), around the size of a house cat. Tooth-based weight estimates are much higher (14 kg (31 lb)), though probably a result of its oversized teeth. This specimen has a skull 11 cm (4.3 in) long. The tail is long by ungulate standards, with at least 18 caudal vertebrae.

=== Skull and teeth ===
The skull of Tetraclaenodon is low and narrowest between the eyes, with a snout slightly longer than the portion behind the eyes. The dental formula is standard for early placentals: 3.1.4.33.1.4.3. The incisors, canines, and earlier premolars (P1-P2) are fairly simple single-cusped teeth, with small gaps between the canines and premolars. Later premolars are somewhat more complex: P3 has two cusps and P4 has four. The first and second upper molars (M1-M2) are boxy and bunodont in form. They have six prominent cusps (paracone, protocone, metacone, hypocone, paraconule, and metaconule) but no lophs (shearing crests). There are strong cingula (raised rims) on the front and rear edges of P3-M3. The third upper molar (M3) is slightly smaller than M1-M2 and lacks a hypocone, unlike Phenacodus. Also unlike Phenacodus, there is no mesostyle on the outer edge of the molars.

Part of a Tetraclaenodon lower jaw in the Museum of Northern Arizona

Like other phenacodontids, the lower jaw is slender along most of its length, though with a tall coronoid process, attaching to muscles which assist vertical crushing more than sideways shearing. The lower molars (and fourth lower premolar, p4) have a paraconid which is vestigial or fused, leaving a ridge in its place. Otherwise, the molars have a standard set of cusps for Paleocene bunodont mammals: metaconid and protoconid at the front, hypoconid, entoconid, and hypoconulid at the back.

=== Forelimb ===
The forelimb has a contradictory set of traits, consistent with a terrestrial lifestyle but also the ability to climb on occasion. The humerus (upper arm bone) has a large lesser tubercle and deltopectoral crest, attachment points for muscles which rotate or pull the arm inwards. The greater tubercle, attaching to muscles which stabilize the shoulder, is small by comparison. The lower end of the humerus is notably broad, and attaches to the short radius (outer bone of the forearm) along a flexible capitulum (part of the shoulder joint). Overall the humerus is less specialized for running than later phenacodontids.

On the other hand, the ulna (inner bone of the forearm) has an inflexible hinge-like connection to the humerus, and its olecranon (elbow knob) is large and straight, more like terrestrial mammals. The ulna and radius are too closely connected to allow the forearm to supinate. There is an alternating arrangement of carpals (wrist bones), unlike the more aligned carpals of Phenacodus. Tetraclaenodon has five-fingered front paws. Based on preserved metacarpals (hand bones), the first and fifth digits are the shortest while the middle (third) digit is the longest, though these differences are less extreme than other phenacodontids or true perissodactyls.

=== Hindlimb ===
The hindlimb supports a terrestrial lifestyle, albeit at a slower pace than Phenacodus. The femur (thigh bone) is straight and strongly-built, with large lesser and third trochanters positioned to maximize leverage over speed. These trochanters attach to muscles which strongly protract and extend the leg, respectively. The tibia (shin bone) is long, with a large cnemial crest and an asymmetrical knee joint, potentially giving Tetraclaenodon a knock-kneed stance.

The ankle bones are rather "primitive", with a trochlea (ankle hinge) of intermediate depth, a separate facet for the fibula, and a large peroneal tubercle with a lower position. These allow for more side-to-side ankle flexibility relative to perissodactyls. Even so, the ankle anatomy supports a digitigrade or semi-digitigrade foot posture similar to other phenacodontids. The hind paws have five toes, with the middle digit longest and the outer digits shortest, as with the front paws. Tetraclaenodon has straight and narrow hooves, different from both the claws of earlier mammals and the broad blunt hooves of Phenacodus and perissodactyls.
