= Hilalia =

Hilalia Temporal range: Mid Eocene 48.6 Ma

Scientific classification
- Kingdom: Animalia
- Phylum: Chordata
- Class: Mammalia
- Infraclass: Placentalia
- Order: †Condylarthra
- Family: †Pleuraspidotheriidae
- Genus: †Hilalia; Maas et al., 2001

Species
- H. robusta; H. saribeya; H. selanneae; H. sezerorum

Extinct genus of mammal

Hilalia is an extinct genus of condylarth that lived during the Eocene. Fossils of Hilalia have been found at Uzunçarsidere Formation in Turkey. It was the last surviving genus of Pleuraspidotheriids, which were previously thought to have gone extinct during the Late Palaeocene.

== Taxonomy ==
Four species have been described, differing from each other primarily by size and premolar morphology.

=== Species ===
- Hilalia robusta
- Hilalia saribeya
- Hilalia selanneae
- Hilalia sezerorum

== Paleoecology ==
During the Eocene, Turkey is believed to have been an island ecosystem, harboring many taxa that had gone extinct on mainland areas earlier.

Living alongside Hilalia were embrithopods and various metatherians, such as the predatory Anatoliadelphys.
