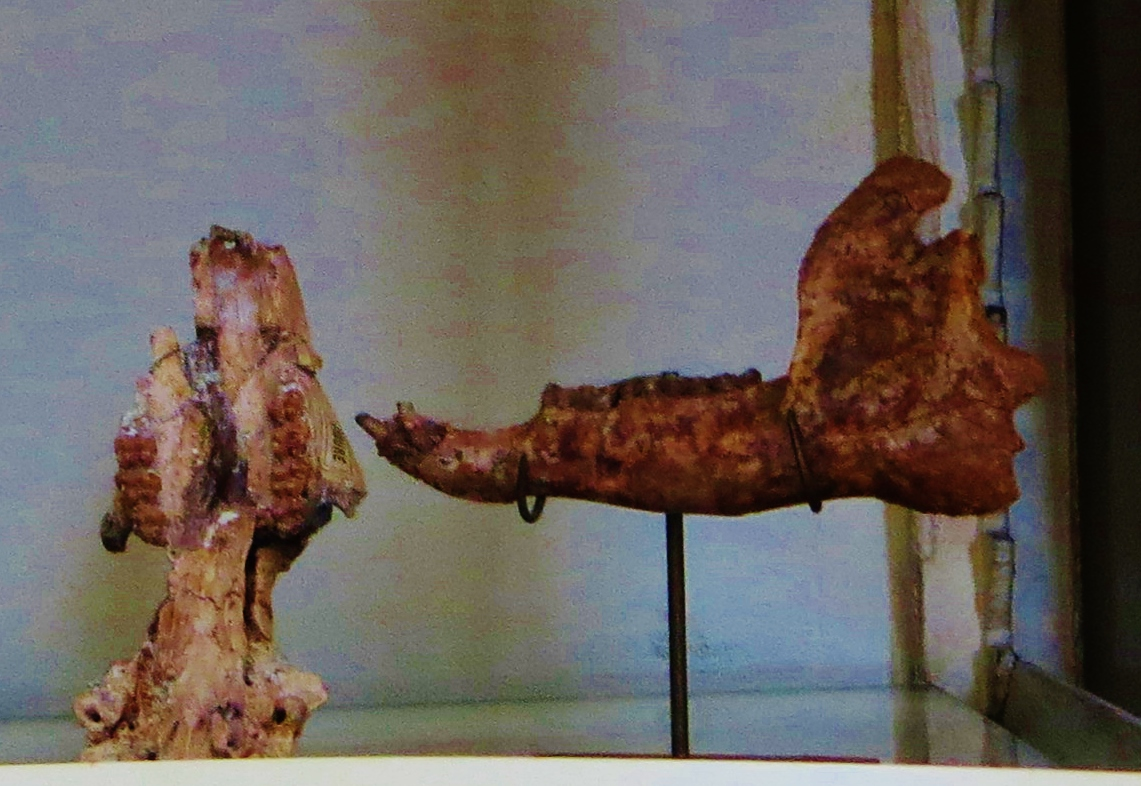
- Pleuraspidotherium aumonieri

Scientific classification
- Kingdom: Animalia
- Phylum: Chordata
- Class: Mammalia
- Infraclass: Placentalia
- Order: †Condylarthra
- Family: †Pleuraspidotheriidae; Zittel, 1892

Genera
- †Hilalia; †Orthaspidotherium; †Parabunodon; †Pleuraspidotherium

= Pleuraspidotheriidae =

Pleuraspidotheriidae Temporal range: Palaeocene - Eocene, 66–48 Ma

Extinct family of mammals

Pleuraspidotheriidae is a family of "condylarths" that lived in Europe from the Palaeocene to the Mid Eocene.
