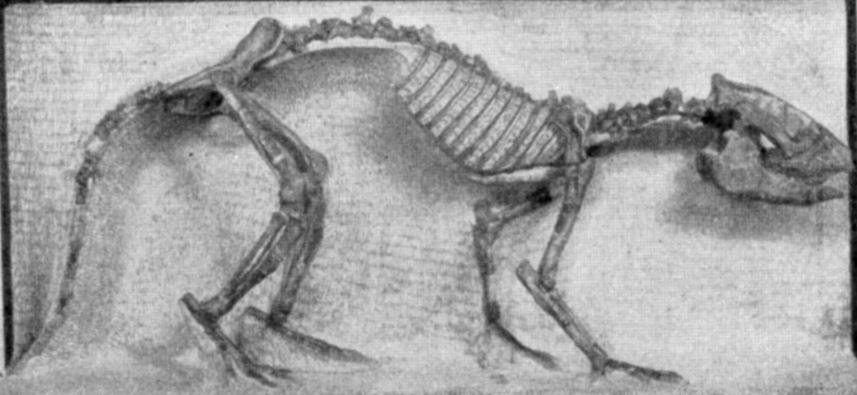
- Skeleton

Scientific classification
- Kingdom: Animalia
- Phylum: Chordata
- Class: Mammalia
- Infraclass: Placentalia
- Family: †Phenacodontidae
- Subfamily: †Meniscotheriinae
- Genus: †Meniscotherium; Cope, 1874

Species
- M. tapiacitum; M. chamense

= Meniscotherium =

Meniscotherium Temporal range: 54–38 Ma Early Eocene to Late Eocene

Meniscotherium is an extinct genus of dog-sized mammal which lived 54–38 million years ago.

== Description ==
Meniscotherium was an herbivore and had hooves. Fossils have been found in Utah, New Mexico and Colorado. Many individuals have been found together, indicating that it lived in groups.

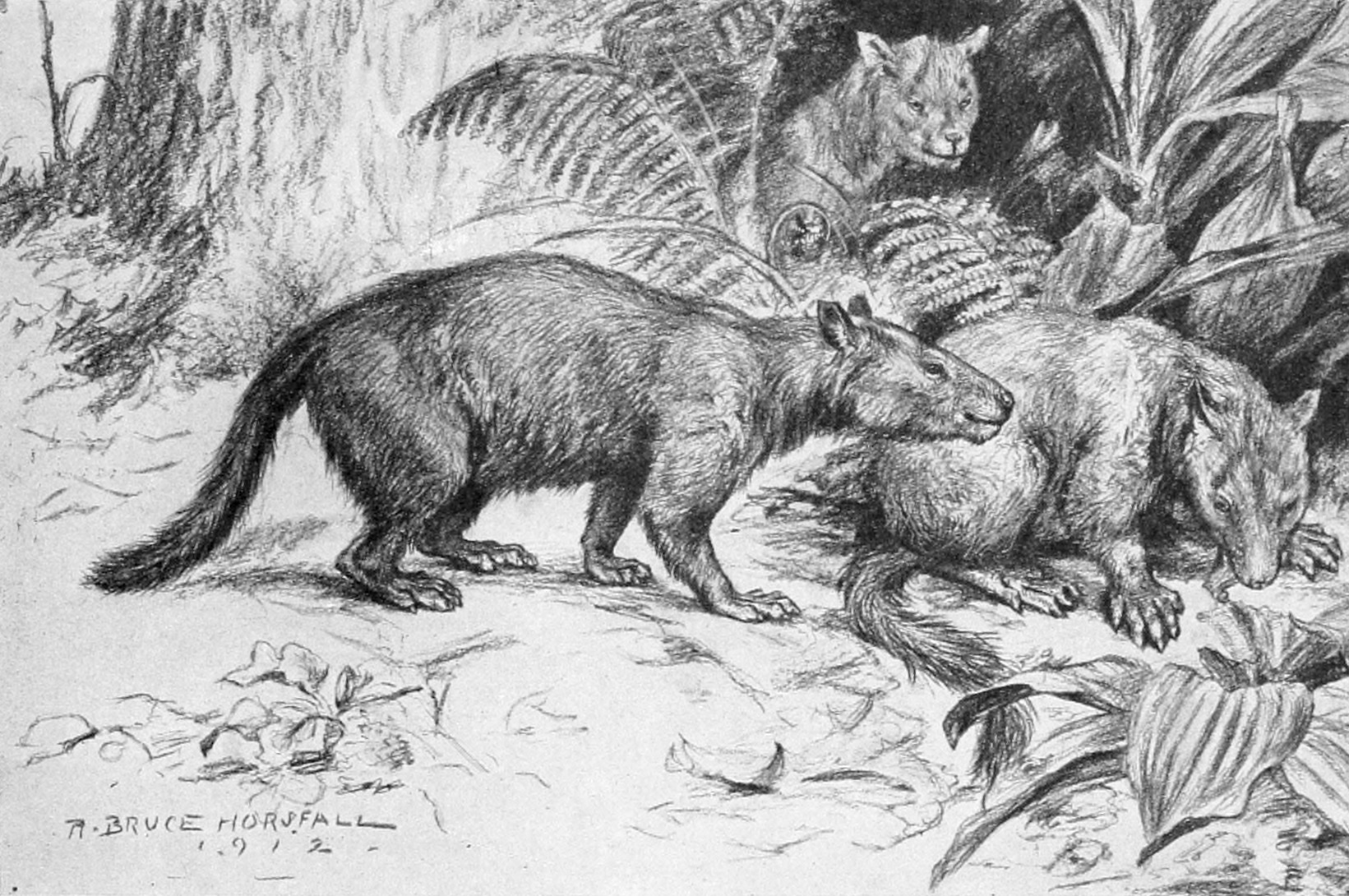
Restoration of M. chamense

Body mass in M. chamense is estimated to be 5–17 kg, making it about the size of a small dog.

The molars of Meniscotherium were crescentic in pattern, with the upper molars bearing two cusps that formed an outer wall. The lower molars had two crescents, similar to other ungulate groups like perissodactyls and artiodactyls. The feet are similar to those of hyraxes, which has led to Meniscotheriinae being placed within Hyracoidea historically, though this proposal has fallen out of favor.

A 2014 cladistic analysis places it within stem perissodactyls. Historically, Meniscotherium and relatives were placed within Condylarthra, alongside other Phenacodontids. This grouping is no longer supported, as well as their placement in the obsolete family Meniscotheriidae.
