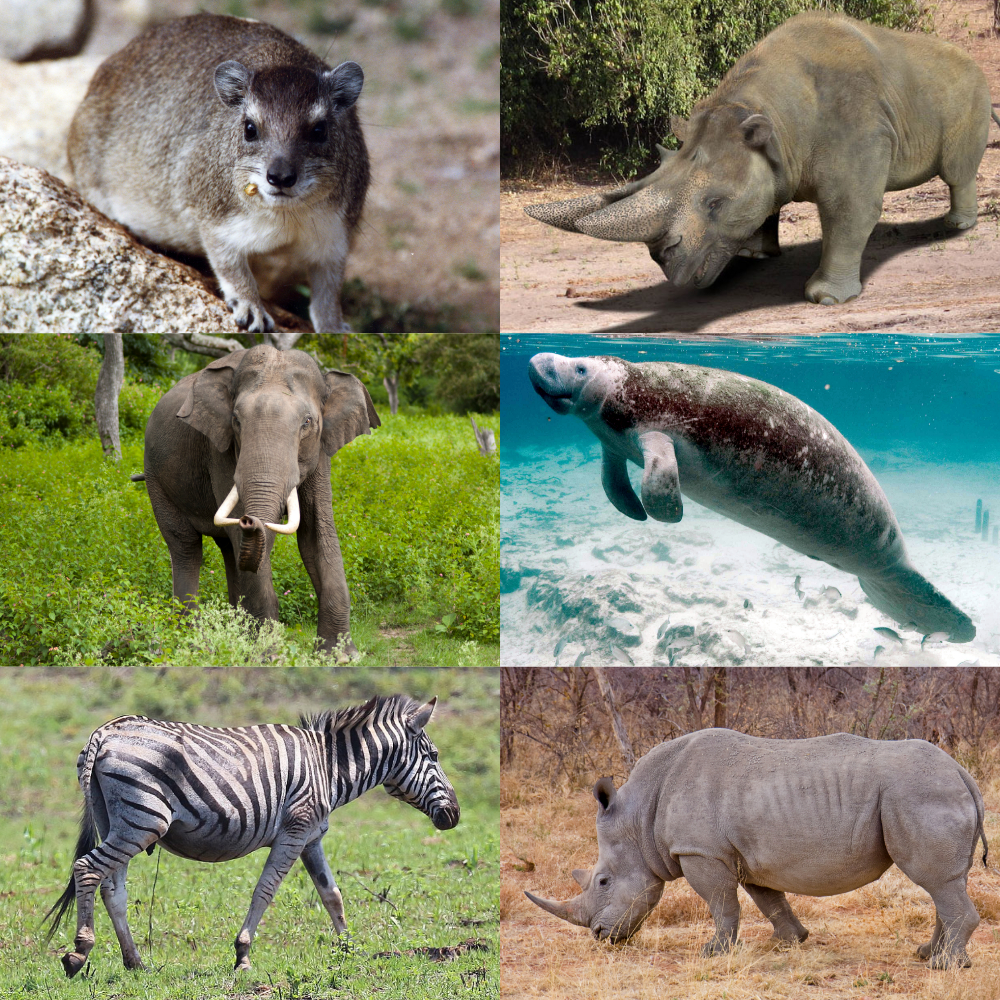
- Top: Rock hyrax (Hyracoidea), Arsinoitherium zitteli (Embrithopoda); Middle: Asian elephant (Proboscidea), West Indian manatee (Sirenia); Bottom: White rhinoceros, Burchell's zebra (Perissodactyla)

Scientific classification
- Kingdom: Animalia
- Phylum: Chordata
- Class: Mammalia
- Superorder: Preptotheria
- (unranked): Altungulata; Prothero & Schoch 1989; Pantomesaxonia; Franz 1924

Orders and suborders
- Perissodactyla; Hippomorpha; Tapiromorpha; †Titanotheriomorpha; Paenungulata; Hyracoidea; Tethytheria

= Altungulata =

Clade of mammals

Altungulata or Pantomesaxonia (sensu Fischer 1986 and later authors) is an invalid clade (mirorder) of ungulate mammals comprising the perissodactyls, hyracoids, and tethytheres (sirenians, proboscideans, and related extinct taxa).

The name "Pantomesaxonia" was originally introduced by Franz 1924, a German zoologist and racial theorist. It was resurrected by Fischer 1986 by including sirenians and excluding South American ungulates, phenacodontids, and meniscotheriids from the original concept.

The name "Altungulata", introduced by Prothero & Schoch 1989 and revised by McKenna & Bell 1997, was erected as an alternative because the updated concept of "Pantomesaxonia" was regarded too deviant from the original concept.

Both names are still in use, and, to add to the confusion, various authors assign different ranks to the involved taxa. For example, according to Thewissen & Domning 1992, Phenacodonta (Phenacodontidae and Meniscotheriidae) and Pantomesaxonia (Sirenia, Desmostylia, Proboscidea, Hyracoidea, and Perissodactyla) are sister groups together making up the superorder Paenungulata.

Altungulata is not supported by molecular evidence unless perissodactyls are excluded (thus dividing Altungulata into Laurasiatheria and Afrotheria), and the validity of the following uniting synapomorphies remain disputed:

- bilophodonty, two lophs or crests running transversally across the crown of the tooth
- large third molars
- molarization of posterior premolars
- elongated thoracic region with at least 19 vertebrae
- clavicle absent
- similar development of fetal membranes

Recent studies on Abdounodus showcase that dental synapomorphies between both groups arose independently, further discrediting the Altungulata hypothesis.

== Classification ==
The classification below is from Rose 2006, p. 242. Paenungulata together with Macroscelidea, Tubulidentata, and the lipotyphlan families Tenrecidae and Chrysochloridae compose Afrotheria. With the exclusion of the better known Radinskya and Minchenella from Phenacolophidae, their affinities to Embrithropoda are suspect, and they were regarded as Altungulata incertae sedis by Mao et al. (2015).

Altungulata Prothero and Schoch 1989

- †Radinskya,
- †Olbitherium
- †Phenacolophidae Zhang 1978
  - †Ganolophus Zhang 1979
  - †Phenacolophus Matthew and Granger 1925 (= Procoryphodon Flerow 1957)
  - †Sanshuilophus Mao et al. 2015
  - †Tieshanilophus Tong 1979
  - †Yuelophus Zhang 1978
  - †Zaisanolophus Gabunia 1998
- Order Perissodactyla
  - Suborder Hippomorpha
    - Superfamily Equoidea
      - Equidae
      - †Palaeotheriidae
  - Suborder Tapiromorpha
    - †Isectolophidae
    - Infraorder Ceratomorpha
      - Superfamily Tapiroidea
        - †Helaletidae
        - †Deperetellidae
        - †Lophialetidae
        - Tapiridae
      - Superfamily Rhinocerotoidea
        - †Hyrachyidae (Hyracodontidae?)
        - †Hyracodontidae
        - †Amynodontidae (Rhinocerotidae?)
        - Rhinocerotidae
    - Infraorder †Ancylopoda
      - †Eomoropidae
      - †Chalicotheriidae
      - †Lophiodontidae (Tapiroidea?)
  - Suborder †Titanotheriomorpha
    - Superfamily †Brontotherioidea
      - †Brontotheriidae (equoids)
      - †Anchilophidae (palaeotheriid equoids?)
- Order Paenungulata (=Uranotheria)
  - Suborder Hyracoidea (sister taxon of Perissodactyla?)
    - †Pliohyracidae
    - Procaviidae
  - Suborder Tethytheria
    - Infraorder †Embrithopoda
      - †Arsinoitheriidae
    - Infraorder Sirenia
      - †Prorastomidae
      - †Protosirenidae (Dugongidae?)
      - Dugongidae
      - Trichechidae
    - Infraorder †Desmostylia
      - †Desmostylidae
    - Infraorder Proboscidea
      - †Anthracobunidae (tethytheres?)
      - †Phosphatheriidae (Numidotheriidae?)
      - †Numidotheriidae
      - †Moeritheriidae
      - †Barytheriidae
      - †Deinotheriidae
      - †Palaeomastodontidae
      - †Phiomiidae
      - †Hemimastodontidae
      - †Mammutidae
      - †Gomphotheriidae
      - Elephantidae

== See also ==
- Mammal classification
