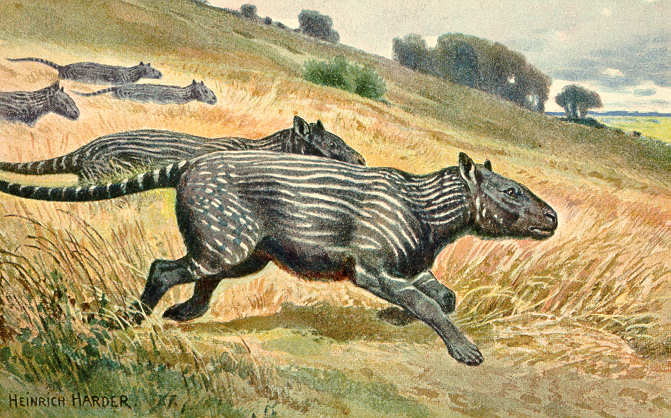
- Phenacodus

Scientific classification
- Kingdom: Animalia
- Phylum: Chordata
- Class: Mammalia
- Clade: Panperissodactyla
- Family: †Phenacodontidae; Cope 1881

Subfamilies and genera
- †Tetraclaenodon; †Phenacodontinae; †Almogaver; †Copecion; †Ectocion; †Lophocion; †Phenacodus; †Meniscotheriinae; †Meniscotherium

= Phenacodontidae =

Phenacodontidae Temporal range: 61–48 Ma Early Paleocene to middle Eocene

Family of mammals

Phenacodontidae is an extinct family of large herbivorous mammals traditionally placed in the "wastebasket taxon" Condylarthra, which may instead represent early-stage perissodactyls. They lived from the late early Paleocene to early middle Eocene (about 60–50 million years ago) and their fossil remains have been found in North America and Europe. The only unequivocal Asian phenacodontid is Lophocion asiaticus.

== Description ==
These animals had a variety of body sizes, and could be as small as domestic cats (Tetraclaenodon and Ectocion) and as large as sheep (Phenacodus). The skull of phenacodontids is long and narrow, and equipped with a small braincase.

The skeleton of phenacodontids show several primitive characteristics (the long and heavy tail for example) but also a number of advanced, Perissodactyla-like adaptations: Their long legs, for example, had five fingers, but the first finger showed a clear reduction, and in some forms (like Phenacodus) the fifth finger was reduced as well.

Some species had tapir-like adaptations suggestive of the presence of a short proboscis or a strong prehensile lip.

The teeth of phenacodontids, particularly in the latter forms, were quite specialized: The molars and premolars were equipped with low cusps that sometimes joined in ridges, similar to the condition found in some perissodactyls. Some forms, like Meniscotherium, had enlarged ridges. This adaptation is unusual for mammals as old as phenacodontids. Only a few other archaic mammals possessed teeth with similar structures, such as Pleuraspidotherium.

== Evolution ==
The phenacodontids evolved in the middle Paleocene in North America. Early forms were usually small; Tetraclaenodon, for example, was the size of a fox. Later forms were much larger and invaded Europe, although they never became as plentiful as in North America.

Towards the beginning of the Eocene these animals slowly disappeared from the fossil record. Only a few forms survived into the middle Eocene: the Phenacodus in Europe and North America, Almogaver in Europe and Ectocion in North America.

An exception to the scarcity of Eocene phenacodontids is the dog-sized genus Meniscotherium, whose fossils are very abundant.

== Classification ==
Phenacodontids have classically been included in the large group Condylarthra, now considered polyphyletic. In particular, the genus Phenacodus is often illustrated as a typical example of a "condylarth", due to the remarkable abundance of fossil remains.

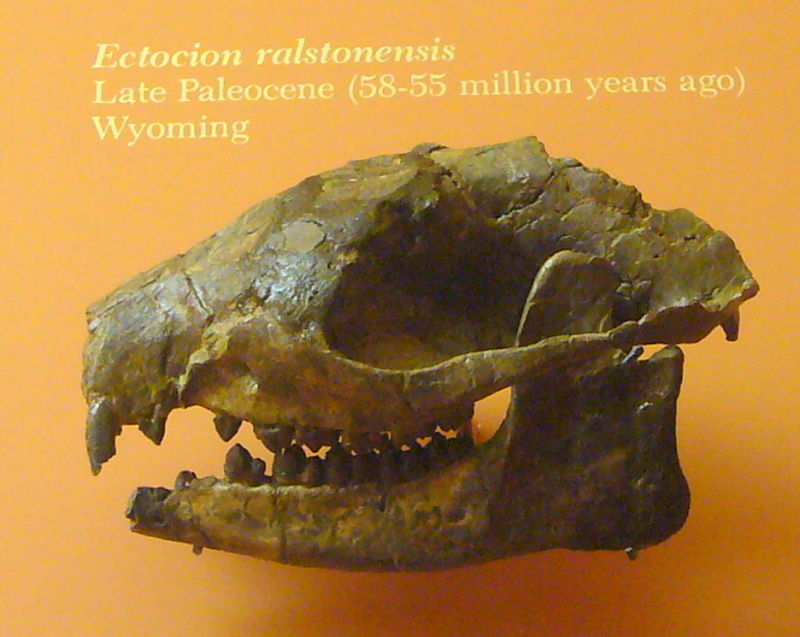
Cranium of Ectocion ralstonensis

- Subfamily Phenacodontinae Cope, 1881
  - Genus Tetraclaenodon Scott, 1893
    - Tetraclaenodon floverianus Cope, 1890
    - Tetraclaenodon puercensis (Cope, 1881)
    - Tetraclaenodon septentrionalis Thewissen, 1990
  - Genus Copecion Gingerich, 1989
    - Copecion brachypternus (Cope, 1882)
    - Copecion davisi Gingerich, 1989
  - Genus Ectocion Cope, 1882
    - Ectocion cedrus Thewissen, 1990
    - Ectocion collinus Russell, 1929
    - Ectocion ignotum Novacek et al., 1991
    - Ectocion major (Patteron & West, 1973)
    - Ectocion mediotuber Thewissen, 1990
    - Ectocion osbornianus (Cope, 1882)
    - Ectocion parvus Granger, 1915
    - Ectocion superstes Granger, 1915
  - Genus Phenacodus Cope, 1873
    - Phenacodus bisonensis Gazin, 1956
    - Phenacodus condali (Crusafont i Villalta, 1955)
    - Phenacodus grangeri Simpson, 1935
    - Phenacodus intermedius Granger, 1915
    - Phenacodus lemoinei Thewissen, 1990
    - Phenacodus magnus Thewissen, 1990
    - Phenacodus matthewi Simpson, 1835
    - Phenacodus primaevus Cope, 1873
    - Phenacodus teilhardi Simpson, 1929
    - Phenacodus trilobatus Cope, 1882
    - Phenacodus vortmani (Cope, 1880)
  - Genus Lophocion Wang and Tong 1997
    - Lophocion asiaticus Wang and Tong 1997
    - Lophocion grangeri Bai et al. 2019
- Subfamiliy Meniscotheriinae Cope, 1882
  - Genus Meniscotherium Cope, 1874
    - Meniscotherium chamense Cope, 1874
    - Meniscotherium tapiacitum Cope, 1882
  - Genus Orthaspidotherium Lemoine, 1878
    - Orthaspidotherium edwardsi Lemoine, 1878

Some phylogenetic analyses have revealed effective relationships between the various groups of "condylarths". One phylogeny suggests there may be close correlations between a clade containing proboscideans, hyracoids, perissodactyls and phenacodontids and another clade with Microhyus and the macroscelids. The clade including these forms would be analogous to the clade Taxeopoda, proposed in 1998.

According to more recent views, instead of a monophyletic clade, the condylarths are better understood as an evolutionary grade that lead to the true ungulates. Phylogenetic analysis of 2012 recover phenacodontids as a series of sister taxa to the Altungulata clade. Later phylogenetic studies confirm that phenacodonts were most closely related to modern odd-toed ungulates.

== Paleobiology ==
The specialized teeth found in at least some phenacodontids seem to indicate a primary herbivorous lifestyle. The shape of the legs indicated that some phenacodontids (like Phenacodus) were swift runners.

== See also ==
- Radinskya, a basal perissodactyl from the Paleocene of China
