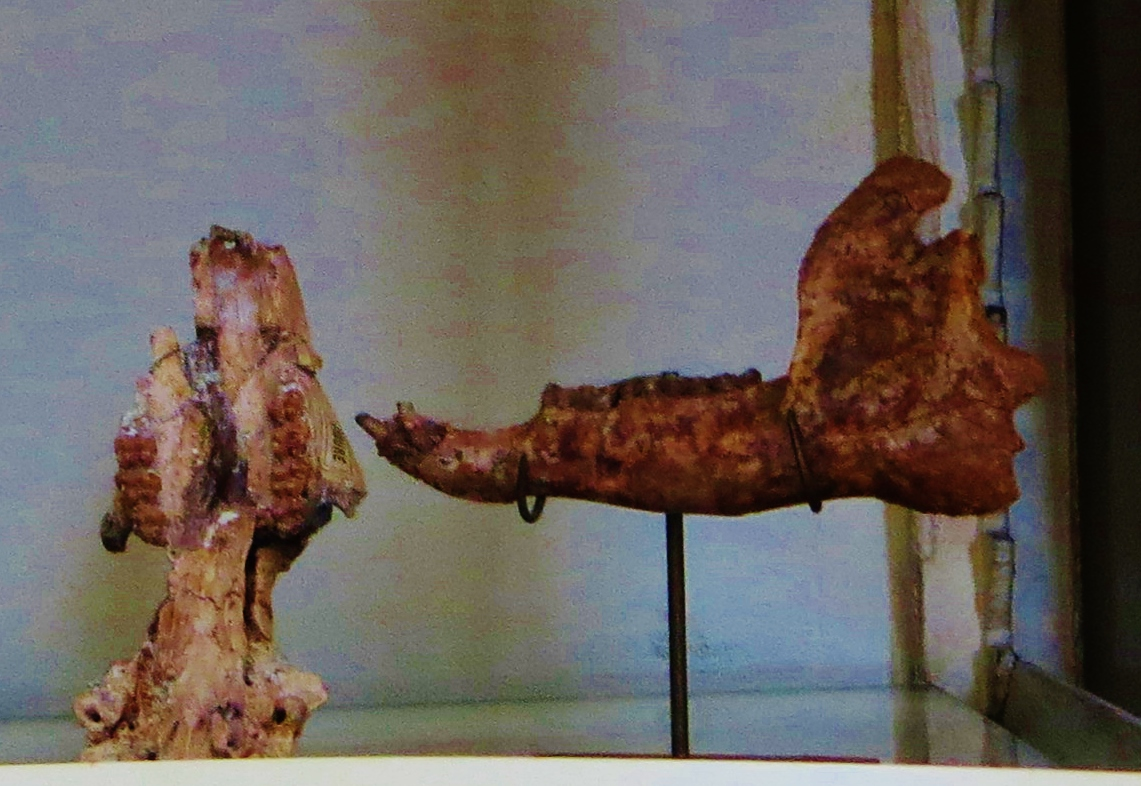
- Pleuraspidotherium aumonieri

Scientific classification
- Kingdom: Animalia
- Phylum: Chordata
- Class: Mammalia
- Order: †Condylarthra
- Family: †Pleuraspidotheriidae
- Genus: †Pleuraspidotherium; Lemoine (1878)

Species
- P. aumonieri Lemoine, 1885 (type species); P. remense Lemoine, 1891

= Pleuraspidotherium =

Pleuraspidotherium Temporal range: Paleocene

Extinct genus of tetrapods

Pleuraspidotherium is an extinct genus of condylarth of the family Pleuraspidotheriidae, whose fossils have been found in the Late Paleocene Marnes de Montchenot of France and the Tremp Formation of modern Spain.
