= Almogaver =

Almogaver Temporal range: Early Paleocene-Middle Eocene

Scientific classification
- Kingdom: Animalia
- Phylum: Chordata
- Class: Mammalia
- Infraclass: Placentalia
- Family: †Phenacodontidae
- Genus: †Almogaver

Species
- †A. condali

Extinct genus of Phenacodontidae

Almogaver is an extinct possible odd-toed ungulate genus in the family Phenacodontidae. It was a ground-dwelling herbivore. It is known from the Tremp Basin in Spain, and some authorities consider it synonymous with Phenacodus.
