= Orthaspidotherium =

Orthaspidotherium Temporal range: Paleocene

Scientific classification
- Kingdom: Animalia
- Phylum: Chordata
- Class: Mammalia
- Infraclass: Placentalia
- Order: †Condylarthra
- Family: †Pleuraspidotheriidae
- Genus: †Orthaspidotherium; Lemoine, 1885
- Species: †O. edwardsi

Binomial name
- †Orthaspidotherium edwardsi Lemoine, 1885

Orthaspidotherium was a European Paleocene genus of early herbivorous mammals of the family Pleuraspidotheriidae. It was included in the family Meniscotheriidae by Teilhard de Chardin in 1921–1922 and was subsequently separated into the family Pleuraspidotheriidae, before being placed in the family Phenacodontidae. The first complete skull of O. edwardsi was described in 2010, and the same paper once again places it in Pleuraspidotheriidae. A 2017 study further reiterates this view.
