= Copecion =

Copecion Temporal range: late Paleocene - early Eocene

Scientific classification
- Kingdom: Animalia
- Phylum: Chordata
- Class: Mammalia
- Family: †Phenacodontidae
- Genus: †Copecion; Gingerich, 1989

Species
- Copecion brachypternus (Cope, 1882); Copecion davisi (type) Gingerich, 1989

Extinct genus of mammals

Copecion was a genus of early herbivorous mammals that was part of the family Phenacodontidae. It reached 6 to 12 kg and was similar in size and morphology to Ectocion. Both these herbivorous ungulates likely occupied similar ecological niches.
