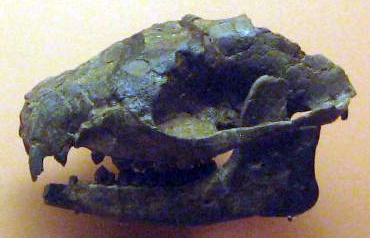
- Ectocion osbornianus

Scientific classification
- Kingdom: Animalia
- Phylum: Chordata
- Class: Mammalia
- Family: †Phenacodontidae
- Genus: †Ectocion; Cope, 1882

Species
- E. cedrus Thewissen, 1990; E. collinus Russell, 1929; E. ignotum Novacek et al., 1991; E. major Patteron & West, 1973; E. mediotuber Thewissen, 1990; E. nanabeensis Beard & Dawson, 2009; E. osbornianus Cope, 1882; E. parvus Granger, 1915; E. stockeyae Montellano-Ballesteros et al., 2021; E. superstes Granger, 1915

= Ectocion =

Ectocion Temporal range: Paleocene - Eocene

Extinct genus of mammals

Ectocion (sometimes Ectocyon) is an extinct genus of placental mammals of the family Phenacodontidae. The genus was earlier classified as Gidleyina (Simpson 1935) and Prosthecion (Patterson and West 1973) It reached 6 to 12 kg and was similar in size and morphology to Copecion. Both these herbivorous ungulates likely occupied similar ecological niches.

Paleocene specimens of these hoofed, ground-dwelling herbivores have been found in Canada (Alberta, Saskatchewan) and the United States (Colorado, Montana, North Dakota, and Wyoming). Eocene specimens have been found in Mexico and the United States (Colorado, Mississippi, Wyoming).

One of the dramatic effects of the Paleocene–Eocene Thermal Maximum (PETM) was some animals evolving smaller bodies. Fossilized Ectocion jaw bones show that this genus was smaller during (E. parvus, 55.5 mya) the PETM than its relatives before (E. osbornianus, 55.6 mya) and after (E. osbornianus, 55.3 mya) the brief climatic peak period.
