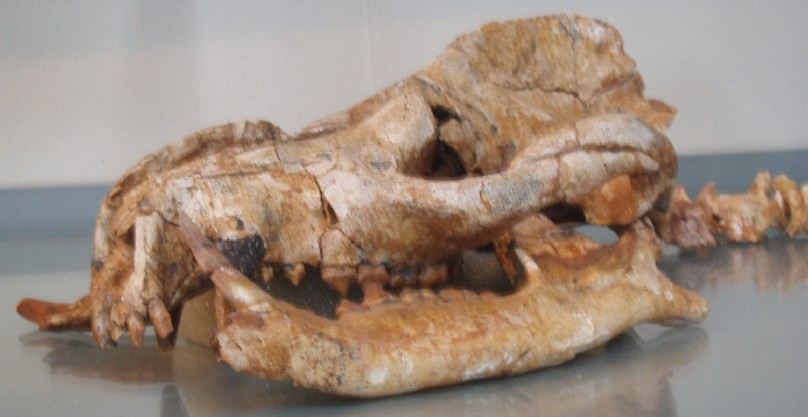
- Skull and vertebrae of Arctocyon primaevus

Scientific classification
- Kingdom: Animalia
- Phylum: Chordata
- Class: Mammalia
- Grandorder: Ungulata
- Order: †Condylarthra; Cope, 1881

Families
- Arctocyonidae; Didolodontidae; Hyopsodontidae; Mioclaenidae; Periptychidae; Phenacodontidae; Pleuraspidotheriidae; Protungulatidae; Sparnotheriodontidae

= Condylarthra =

Condylarthra Temporal range: Late Cretaceous to Late Eocene 66.3–37.2 Ma

Grouping of extinct mammals

Condylarthra, also known as archaic ungulates, is an informal group – previously considered an order – of extinct placental mammals, known primarily from the Paleocene and Eocene epochs. It is now largely considered to be a wastebasket taxon, having served as a dumping ground for classifying ungulates which had not been clearly established as part of either Perissodactyla or Artiodactyla, being composed thus of several unrelated lineages. Spharnotheriodontidae recovered as a family of Litopterna. Additionally, some condylarths, such as Kharmerungulatum, were found to be have been outside of ungulates entirely. Arctocyonidae was recovered as a polyphyletic family of mammals, with the placement within Ferungulata varying between genera.

== Taxonomy ==
Condylarthra always was a problematic group. When first described by Cope 1881, Phenacodontidae was the type and only family therein. Cope 1885, however, raised Condylarthra to an order and included a wide range of diverse placentals with generalized dentitions and postcranial skeletons. More recent researchers (i.e. post-WW2) have been more restrictive; either including only a limited number of taxa, or proposing that the term should be abandoned altogether. Due to their primitive characteristics condylarths have been considered ancestral to several ungulate orders, including the living Artiodactyla, Cetacea, Perissodactyla, Hyracoidea, Sirenia, and Proboscidea, as well as the extinct Desmostylia, Embrithopoda, Litopterna, Notoungulata, and Astrapotheria.

Prothero, Manning & Fischer 1988 delimited condylarths as those having the following characters, but lacking the specializations present in more derived orders:

- superior ramus of stapedial artery shifted to petrosal or lost
- mastoid foramen lost
- bulla if present composed of ectotympanic
- relatively bunodont teeth with low cusp relief
- trigonids of lower molars shortened anteroposteriorly
- large, posteriorly projecting hypoconulid on M_{3} (lower third molar)
- head of astragalus is short and robust

== Evolutionary history ==
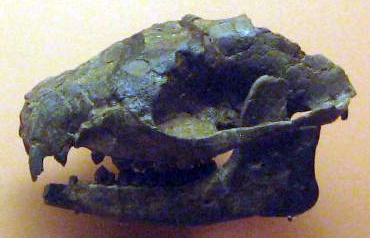
Ectocion, a small plant-eating phenacodontid found in Wyoming

The disappearance of the non-avian dinosaurs opened up an ecological niche for large mammalian herbivores. Some condylarths evolved to fill the niche, while others remained insectivorous. This may explain, in part, the tremendous evolutionary radiation of the condylarths that we can observe throughout the Paleocene, resulting in the different groups of ungulates (or "hoofed mammals") that form the dominant herbivores in most Cenozoic animal communities on land, except on the island continent of Australia.

Among recent mammals, Paenungulata (hyraxes, elephants, and sea cows), Perissodactyla (horses, rhinoceroses, and tapirs), Artiodactyla (pigs, deer, antelope, cows, camels, hippos, and their relatives), Cetacea (whales), and Tubulidentata (aardvarks) are traditionally regarded as members of the Euungulata. Besides these, several extinct animals also belong to this group, especially the endemic South American orders of ungulates, (Meridiungulata). Although many ungulates have hooves, this feature does not define the Euungulata. Indeed, some condylarths had small hooves on their feet, but the most primitive forms are clawed.

Recent molecular and DNA research has reorganised the picture of mammalian evolution. Paenungulates and tubulidentates are seen as afrotherians, and no longer seen as closely related to the laurasiatherian perissodactyls, artiodactyls, and cetaceans, implying that hooves were acquired independently (i.e. were analogous) by at least two different mammalian lineages, once in the Afrotheria and once in the Laurasiatheria. Condylarthra itself, therefore, is polyphyletic: the several condylarth groups are not closely related to each other at all. Indeed, Condylarthra is sometimes regarded as a 'wastebasket' taxon. True relationships remain in many cases unresolved.

In addition to meridiungulates and living ungulates, a condylarthran ancestry has been proposed for several other extinct groups of mammals, including Mesonychia and Dinocerata.

== See also ==
- Evolution of mammals
- List of prehistoric mammals
