= Marnes d'Auzas Formation =

Geologic formation in France

- Stratigraphic range: Late Cretaceous (Late Maastrichtian); ~67.5–66 Ma
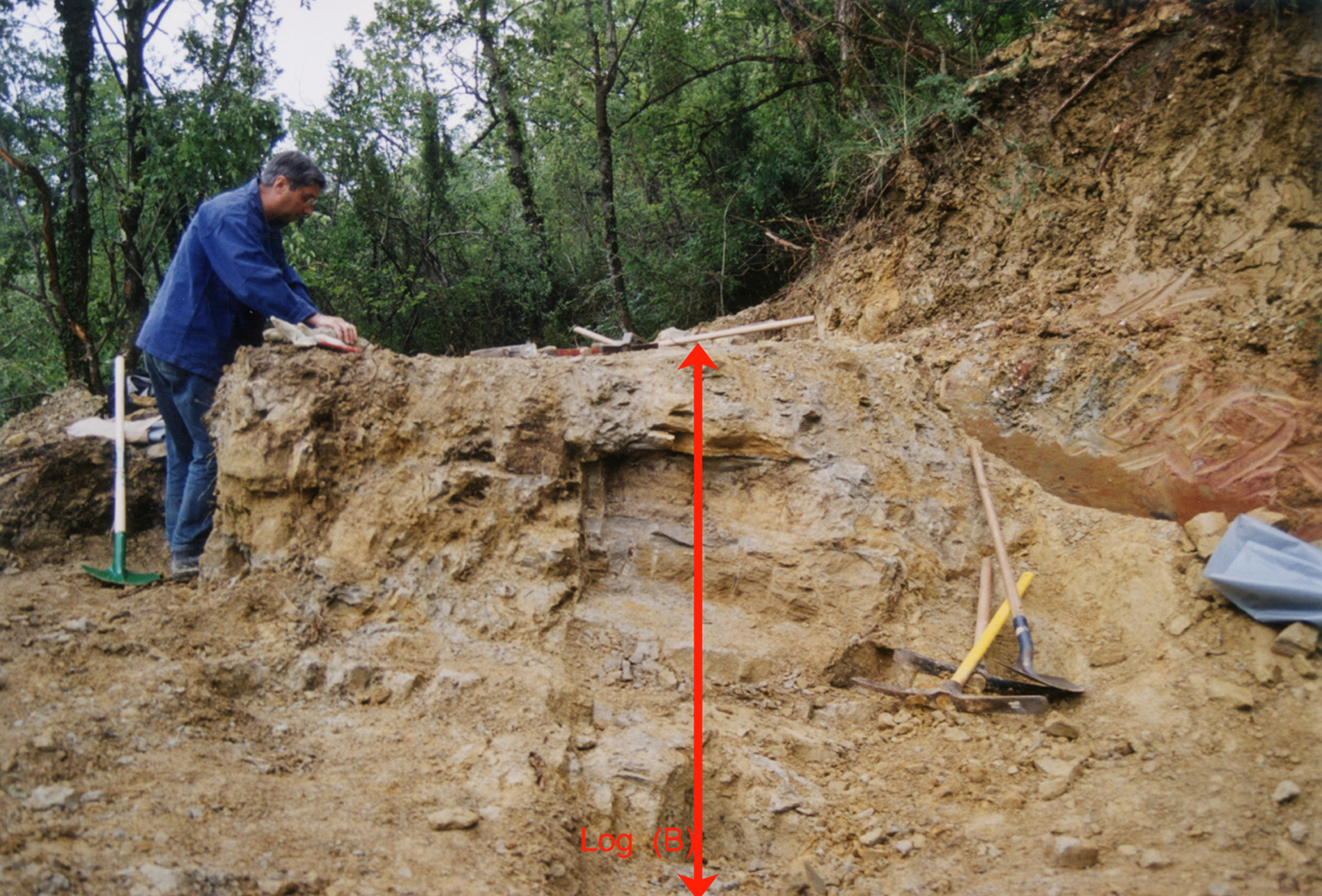
- Sandstones and marls of the Tricouté 4 site in the middle part of the Marnes d’Auzas Formation
- Type: Geological formation
- Underlies: Aurignac Formation
- Overlies: Nankin Limestone Formation, Calcarenites du Jadet Formation, Grès de Labarre Formation
- Thickness: About 100 m (330 ft) ; up to 285 m (935 ft)?

Lithology
- Primary: Marls
- Other: Sandstones, limestones

Location
- Coordinates: 43°25′N 1°30′E
- Region: Occitania
- Country: France
- Marnes d'Auzas Formation (France) Marnes d'Auzas Formation (Occitanie) Marnes d'Auzas Formation (Haute-Garonne)

The Marnes d'Auzas Formation (Auzas Marls Formation) is a geological Formation in southwestern France whose strata date back to the Late Maastrichtian, approximately 67.5 to 66 million years ago. It consists primarily of marls with some interbeds of sandstones and limestones. These sediments correspond to varied paleoenvironments where lagoons, coastal marshes and more continental environments (lakes, rivers and alluvial plains) coexist and/or follow one another. The Marnes d’Auzas Formation has yielded numerous fossils of aquatic and terrestrial invertebrates and vertebrates, including dinosaurs.

== Location ==
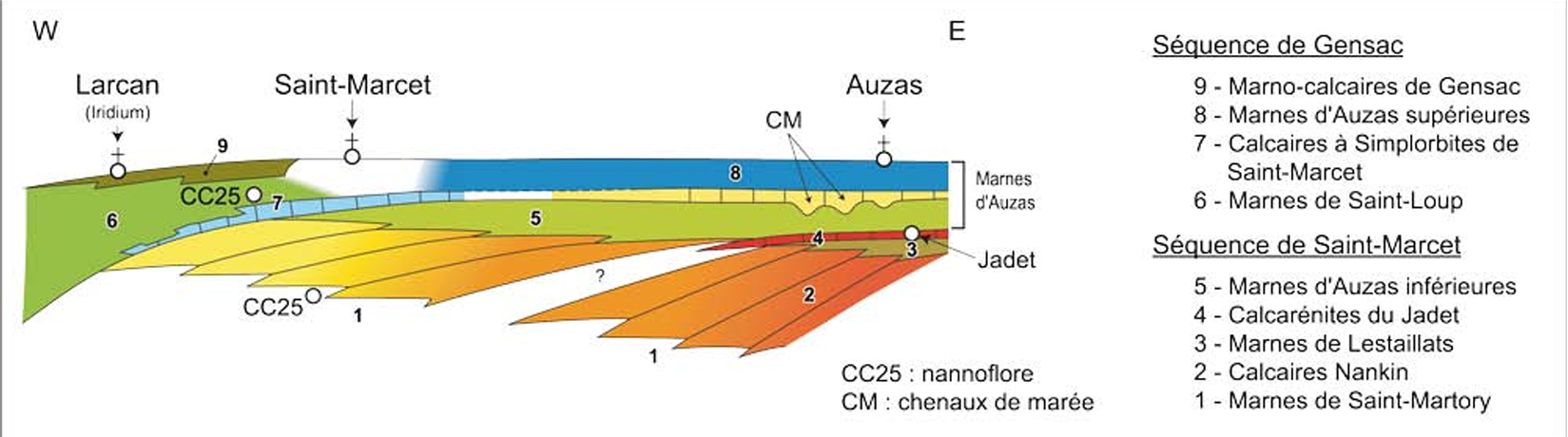
Location of the Marnes d'Auzas Formation within the Maastrichtian deposits organization of the Petites-Pyrénées (Haute-Garonne).

The Marnes d’Auzas Formation outcrops in the Aurignac, Saint-Martory and Plagne anticlines in the central part of the Haute-Garonne department (Petites Pyrénées), as well as in the Montfa anticline in Ariège department (Plantaurel massif) in Occitania region. The Marnes d’Auzas Formation conformably overlies the Nankin limestone Formation in the Aurignac anticline, the Calcarenites du Jadet Formation in the Saint-Martory and Plagne anticlines, (Note: In the Saint-Martory and Plagne anticlines, the layers equivalent to the Nankin Limestone Formation of the Aurignac anticline are represented by the Ausseing Group which contains two carbonate formations, the Nankin 2 Limestone Formation at the base and the Jadet Calcarenites Formation at the top, separated from each other by a marly intercalation, the Lestaillats Marls Formation.) and the Grès de Labarre Formation in the Montfa anticline. The Marnes d’Auzas Formation is conformably overlain by the Lower Paleocene (Danian) Aurignac Formation.

== Lithostratigraphy and paleoenvironment ==
The Marnes d’Auzas Formation is composed mainly of grey to multi-coloured clayey marls (ochre, green, red, or wine-coloured). The marls contain locally several limestone levels (calcarenites, sandy limestones, marly limestones, chalky limestones) and sandstone beds, sometimes cross-bedded. In the type locality of the formation, Bilotte assigns it a thickness of 285 m (935 ft). Other publications indicate a thickness of 250 m (820 ft) or only about 100 m (330 ft).

The Marnes d’Auzas Formation corresponds to sediments whose depositional environment evolved from the paralic domain (coastal lagoons, tidal marsh, tidal muddy channels, mudflats) at the base of the formation, towards a more continental domain (freshwater marshes and lakes, alluvial plain, fluvial channels) in its upper part. The Marnes d’Auzas Formation was deposited on the west coast of the former Ibero-Armorican island, which included a large part of France and Spain.

The rocks of the Marnes d’Auzas Formation and the underlying Ausseing Group attest the alternation of shallow marine sediments and coastal continental deposits (estuarine and fluvial) corresponding to the fluctuations in sea level and the variations in the coastline during the upper Maastrichtian in this part of the Ibero-Armorican island.

== Age ==
The Marnes d’Auzas Formation is dated to the late Maastrichtian on the basis of its paleontological content, which notably combines marine and continental microfauna and microflora characteristic of this age, but also thanks to the age of the underlying geological formations, and on correlations with the open-ocean deposits of the blue marls of Saint-Loup and yellow marly limestones of Gensac, two western lateral equivalents of the Marnes d’Auzas, which yielded ammonites and foraminifera characteristic of the late Maastrichtian. Furthermore, at Larcan, the yellow marly limestones of Gensac Formation yielded remains of the hadrosaur Canardia garonnensis (also known in the Marnes d’Auzas Formation) in a stratum located less than one meter below the iridium level marking the Cretaceous–Paleogene boundary (and therefore between the Maastrichtian and the Danian).

== Paleontology ==
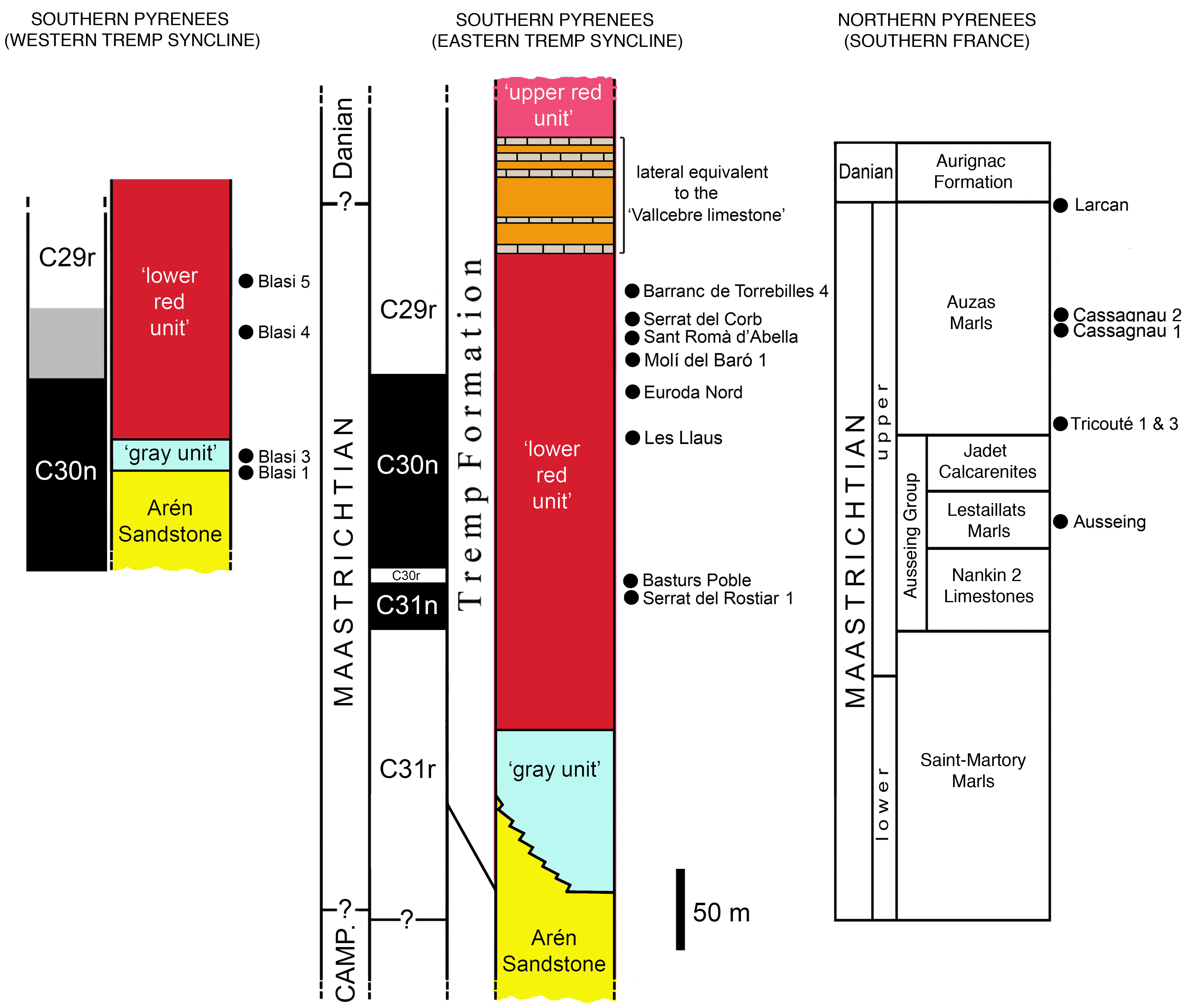
Stratigraphic distribution of lambeosaurine dinosaurs localities in the Pyrenees, including the Marnes d'Auzas Formation.

The Marnes d’Auzas Formation contains a wide variety of fossils related to the diversity of marginal-littoral and continental paleoenvironments that meet and/or succeed each other. The formation has yielded numerous foraminifera, ostracods, bivalves, gastropods and charophytes characteristic of different environments. Vertebrate remains are also abundant, including numerous dinosaur bones, among which the lambeosaurine hadrosaurids predominate.These dinosaurs are represented only by juvenile specimens. According to Yves Laurent, this could be explained by a taphonomic bias due to particuliar transport conditions that would have resulted in the deposition of small materials.

== Vertebrates of the Marnes d'Auzas Formation ==
Color key: Taxon / Reclassified taxon / Taxon falsely reported as present / Dubious taxon or junior synonym / Ichnotaxon / Ootaxon / Morphotaxon	Notes; Uncertain or tentative taxa are in small text; ~~crossed out~~ taxa are discredited.

=== Fish ===
Fish of the Marnes d'Auzas Formation
Genus	Species	Location	Stratigraphic position	Material	Notes	Images
Alestidae indet.	Indeterminate	Tricouté 4	Middle	A lower tooth	A characiform fish	
Chondrichthyes indet.	Indeterminate	Marsoulas		Teeth		
Coupatezia	C. fallax	Peyrecave	Top of Lower	A tooth	A dasyatid stingray. Specimen originally assigned to an undetermined species of Coupatezia closely resembling C. fallax. Subsequently, Cappetta and Corral assigned this tooth to this species.	
Lepisosteidae indet.	Indeterminate	Cassagnau 1 and 2	Middle	Scales, vertebrae	A gar	
cf. Lepisosteus	cf. L. sp.	Cassagnau 1 and 2	Middle	Teeth	A gar	
Palaeogaleus	P. sp.	Peyrecave	Top of Lower	Two teeth	A triakid shark	
Paratrygonorrhina	P. amblysoda	Peyrecave	Top of Lower	Teeth	A guitarfish. The only tooth figured in 1997 was first attributed to Rhinobatos sp., then to P. amblysoda in 2007.	
Phyllodontidae	Indeterminate	Cassagnau 1	Middle	Teeth		
cf. Pycnodus	cf. P. sp.	Mérigon 2	Upper	Teeth		
Rhombodus	R. binkhorsti	Peyrecave	Top of Lower	Teeth	A stingray of the extinct family Rhombodontidae	Life restoration of Rhombodus binkhorsti.
Sparidae indet.	Indeterminate	Cassagnau 1 and Marsoulas	Middle	Teeth		

=== Amphibians ===
Amphibians of the Marnes d'Auzas Formation
Genus	Species	Location	Stratigraphic position	Material	Notes	Images
Albanerpetontidae indet.	Indeterminate	Cassagnau 1	Middle	MDE-Cas1-156, a dentary fragment		
Anura indet.	Indeterminate	Peyrecave	Top of Lower	Fragments of long bone, scapula, and possibly vertebrae and maxillae (cited but not described)		
Urodela indet.	Indeterminate	Peyrecave	Top of Lower	Unspecified (cited but not described)		

=== Squamates ===
Squamates of the Marnes d'Auzas Formation
Genus	Species	Location	Stratigraphic position	Material	Notes	Images
Amphisbaenia? indet.	Indeterminate	Tricouté 1	Lower (Note: Curiously, Gheerbrant and colleagues place the Tricouté 1 site in the middle part of the Marnes d’Auzas Formation, while other authors place it at the base of the formation.)	A vertebra		
Teiidae indet.	Indeterminate	Peyrecave	Top of Lower	Tooth		
Teiiodea indet.	Indeterminate	Tricouté 4	Middle	A partial dentary	A possible barbatteiid?=	
Varanoidea indet.	Indeterminate	Cassagnau 2	Middle	MDE-Ca2-124, a dorsal vertebra	A probable freshwater mosasauroid	

=== Turtles ===
Turtles of the Marnes d'Auzas Formation
Genus	Species	Location	Stratigraphic position	Material	Notes	Images
?Foxemys	?F. sp.	Cassagnau 2	Middle	MDE-Cas2-212, right epiplastron + entoplastron	A bothremydid turtle	
Iberoccitanemys	I. atlanticum	Cassagnau 2	Middle	MDE-Cas2-259, an almost complete shell	A bothremydid turtle. This specimen, first assigned to a new species of the genus Elochelys (E. convenarum), was later referred to the new genus Iberoccitanemys with the new combination I. convenarum. This species was subsequently synonymyzed with Polysternon atlanticum (which does not belong to the genus Polysternon) under the new combination I. atlanticum.	Shell of Iberoccitanemys atlanticum from Cassagnau 2.
Pleurodira indet.	Indeterminate	Cassagnau 1 and 2, Mérigon 1	Middle and Upper	Dermal plates, girdle and limb elements		

=== Crocodilians ===
Crocodilians of the Marnes d'Auzas Formation
Genus	Species	Location	Stratigraphic position	Material	Notes	Images
Crocodyliformes indet.	Indeterminate	Auzas, Cassagnau 1 and 2, Mérigon 1, Tricouté 1 and 3, Peyrecave	Lower to Upper	Teeth (all sites); vertebrae (Cas 1 and Cas 2); MDE-Cas2-263, 264, osteoderms; MDE-Cas2-30, articulated articular and surangular; MDE-Cas2-141, one chevron; MDE-Ca2-51, 224, two left scapulae		
Eusuchia indet.	Indeterminate	Cassagnau 2	Middle	MDE-Cas2-229, dorsal (thoracic?) vertebra ; MDE-Cas2-31, 218, dorsal (lumbar?) vertebrae ; MDE-Cas-32, caudal vertebra	Vertebrae possibly belonging to Thoracosaurus	
Musturzabalsuchus?	M sp.?	Cassagnau 1 and 2	Middle	Teeth	A probable allodaposuchid eusuchian (Note: Musturzabalsuchus is probably a junior synonym of Allodaposuchus.)	
Thoracosaurus	T. neocesariensis?	Cassagnau 1 and 2	Middle	MDE-Cas1-199, almost complete skull lacking mandible; Teeth; MDE-Cas2-262, left humerus; MDE-Cas2-33, 202, two cervical vertebrae; MDE-Cas1-167 and MDE-Cas2-126, osteoderms	Skull initially assigned to Thoracosaurus neocesariensis. According to Christopher Brochu, this specimen belongs to a taxon disctinct from T. neocesariensis. However, this material has not been re-studied since.	Skull (MDE-Cas1-199) of Thoracosaurus neocesariensis from Cassagnau 1.

=== Dinosauria ===
Dinosauria of the Marnes d'Auzas Formation
Genus	Species	Location	Stratigraphic position	Material	Notes	Images
Abelisauridae indet.	Indeterminate	Cassagnau 1	Middle	MDE-Cas1-210, a tooth 4.4 centimetres (2 in) high	Initially referred to a Theropoda indet., this tooth has been reinterpreted as belonging to an indeterminate abelisaurid.	
Canardia	C. garonnensis	Tricouté 3	Lower	MDE-Ma3-25, an isolated dentary tooth crown; MDE-Ma3-26, a portion of the dental battery of the right mandible; MDE-Ma3-16, holotype right maxilla; MDE-Ma3-15, a partial left maxilla; MDE-Ma3-17, a left quadrate; MDE-Ma3-18, a right prefrontal; MDE-Ma3-19, a partial left surangular; MDE-Ma3-28, an articular; MDE-Ma3-29, a partial right postorbital; MDE-Ma3-30, a partial right pterygoid; MDE-Ma3-21 and MDE-Ma3-12, two partial left scapulae (Note: MDE-Ma3-21 is the most complete scapula; MDE-Ma3-12 is less complete than MDE-Ma3-21 but preserves a more complete scapular blade showing distal expansion.); MDE-Ma3-24, an incomplete left sternal plate; MDE-Ma3-20, a left humerus; MDE-Ma3-23, a partial right pubis	A lambeosaurine hadrosaurid. Prieto-Márquez et al. initially assigned Canardia to a clade of basal lambeosaurines, the aralosaurines. Later, Longrich et al. classified Canardia and all European and North African lambeosaurines into a more derived clade, the arenysaurines. Alternatively, Ramírez-Velasco did not recognize either the aralosaurine or the arenysaurine clades and positioned Canardia as the sister taxon to the clade Corythosauria.	Holotype right maxilla of Canardia garonnensis from Tricouté 3. Skull reconstruction of Canardia garonnensis showing known elements in white.
Dromaeosauridae indet.	Indeterminate	Cassagnau 1 and 2	Middle	MDE-Cas1-92, tooth); MDE-Cas2-28, tooth (the largest tooth 2.6 centimetres (1 in) high and 1.7 centimetres (1 in) wide); MDE-Cas2-232		
Enantiornithes? indet.	Indeterminate	Cassagnau 1	Middle	MDE-Cas1-152, a proximal end of a scapula	An enantiornithean bird	
Euronychodon?	E. sp.	Marsoulas	Middle	MDE-Mar-03, tooth		
Hadrosauridae indet.	Indeterminate	Auzas		MDE-Auz1-01, a proximal humerus ; a distal femur		
Hadrosauridae indet.	Indeterminate	Mérigon 1	Upper	Dentary, tooth		
Hadrosauridae indet.	Indeterminate	Peyrecave	Top of Lower	Fragmentary teeth		
Hadrosauridae indet.	Indeterminate	Tricouté 2	Lower	MDE-Ma2-01, fragment of dentary dental battery including four teeth; caudal vertebrae; tibiae (including MDE-Ma1-02, a 47 centimetres (19 in) long specimen); MDE-Ma1-03, a right metatarsal IV	The teeth possibly belong to a lambeosaurine	
Lambeosaurinae indet.	Indeterminate	Cassagnau 1	Middle	MDE-Cas1-200, proximal region of a left ischium; MDE-Cas1-14, MDE-Cas1-215 et 216, three ungual phalanges; MDE-Cas1-03, maxillary tooth crown; three dentary tooth crowns (including MDE-Cas1-01 et MDE-Cas1-11)		Fragmentary ischium and three isolated teeth of indeterminate Lambeosaurinae from Cassagnau 1 and Tricouté 1.
Lambeosaurinae indet.	Indeterminate	Cassagnau 2	Middle	MDE-Cas2-138 and MDE-Cas2-248, a predentary and a complete left dentary belonging to a single individual; MDE-Cas2-02, a partial left dentary; MDE-Cas2-11, a set of dentary tooth crowns; MDE-Cas2-223, an isolated dentary tooth crown; MDE-Cas2-207, a distal end of left humerus; MDE-Cas2-23 and MDE-Cas2-249, tibiae; MDE-Cas2-250, a right fibula; An articulated partial postcranial skeleton (Note: This partial skeleton consists of MDE-Cas2-04, 05, 06, 07, 08, 09 and 10, seven complete cervical vertebrae ; MDE-Cas2-01, a complete left pubis ; MDE-Cas2-12 and 15, left and right nearly complete femora ; MDE-Cas2-13, left tibia ; MDE-Cas2-14 and MDE-Cas-16, left and right fibulae ; MDE-Cas2-17, 18 and 19, left metatarsals II, III and IV ; MDE-Cas2-21 and 22, two phalanges.), several ribs (including MDE-Cas2-260), a chevron (MDE-Cas-2-239), and centra of caudal vertebrae were also found.	Remains first attributed to an indeterminate Euhadrosauria then to an indeterminate lambeosaurine. The pubis of the Cassagnau 2 hadrosaurid exhibits typical lambeosaurine characteristics and in particular shows similarities with the pubis of Parasaurolophus cyrtocristatus, Corythosaurus casuarius, Magnapaulia laticaudus, and, among Ibero-Armorican lambeosaurines, with Arenysaurus. The presence of accessory ridges on at least some dentary teeth from this locality also suggests that they belong to a lambeosaurine. Since the maxilla is not preserved in the Cassagnau 2 lambeosaurine, it is not known whether the material from this site belongs to Canardia (known both in older and younger strata of the same region) or to another lambeosaurine.	Skeletal elements (predentary in dorsal and ventral views, two lower jaws, teeth, and a pubis) of an indeterminate lambeosaurine from Cassagnau 2. Partial skeleton of a juvenile lambeosaurine from Cassagnau 2.
Lambeosaurinae indet.	Indeterminate	Tricouté 1	Lower	MDE-Ma1-01, dentary tooth crown ; another tooth is cited and figured by Gheerbrant et al.	MDE-Ma1-01 was first attributed to an indeterminate hadrosaurid, then to an indeterminate lambeosaurine.	
Titanosauria indet.	Indeterminate	Cassagnau 1 and 2	Middle	MDE-Cas1-10, tooth; MDE-Cas2-26, tooth; MDE-Cas2-27, tooth; MDE-Cas2-25, a left metacarpal IV	A titanosaurian sauropod. In comparison to older titanosaurs from the Ibero-Armorican island, the teeth of this form are different from those of Ampelosaurus and Lirainosaurus, and resemble those of Atsinganosaurus.	

=== Pterosaurs ===
Pterosaurs of the Marnes d'Auzas Formation
Genus	Species	Location	Stratigraphic position	Material	Notes	Images
Azhdarchidaeindet.	Indeterminate	Mérigon 1	Upper	MDE-Me1-04, a nearly complete cervical vertebra with part of both ends missing.	A quetzalcoatline azhdarchid belonging to the clade Serpennata, which grouped together quetzalcoatlines possessing highly elongated cervical vertebrae. As preserved, this vertebra measures 46 centimetres (18 in) long, but its total length is estimated at 55 centimetres (22 in). It belongs to a giant pterosaur with an estimated wingspan of 8.5 to 9 metres (28 to 30 ft).	Azhdarchid cervical vertebra from Mérigon 1.

=== Mammals ===
Mammals of the Marnes d'Auzas Formation
Genus	Species	Location	Stratigraphic position	Material	Notes	Images
cf. Azilestes	cf. A. yvettae	Tricouté 4	Middle	A left upper molar	A zhelestid eutherian	
Hainina	H. cassagnauensis	Tricouté 1 and 4	Middle	One tooth from TRCT 1 and six teeth from TRCT 4	A kogaionid multituberculate.	
Theria indet.	Indeterminate	Peyrecave	Top of Lower	Five fragmentary teeth		

== See also ==
- List of dinosaur-bearing rock formations

== Bibliography ==
- Bilotte, M. (1980). "Le gisement d'Auzas (Maastrichtien des Petites-Pyrénées). Stratigraphie – Environnements". Bulletin de la Société d’histoire naturelle de Toulouse. 116: 57–63.
- Bilotte, M. (1985). "Le Crétacé supérieur des plates-formes est-pyrénéennes". Strata. 5: 1–438.
- Bilotte, M. (1991). "Séquences de dépôt et limites de blocs dans le Crétacé terminal et le Paléocène basal du bassin d'avant-pays sous-pyrénéen (Petites Pyrénées – Dômes annexes, France)". Bulletin des Centres de Recherches Exploration - Production Elf-Aquitaine. 15 (2): 411–437.
- Bilotte, M.; Andreu, B . (2006). "Les marnes d'Auzas (Maastrichtien supérieur sous-pyrénéen). Stratigraphie et paléoenvironnements, associations d'ostracodes" (PDF). Revista Española de Micropaleontología. 38 (2–3): 309–320.
- Bilotte, M.; Laurent, Y.; Téodori, D. (2010). "Restes d'hadrosaure dans le Crétacé terminal marin de Larcan (Petites-Pyrénées, Haute-Garonne, France)". Carnets de Géologie / Notebooks on Geology. 10 (Letter 2010/02): 1–10. doi:10.4267/2042/32428.
- Bilotte, M.; Tambareau, Y.; Villatte, J. (1983). "Le Crétacé supérieur et la limite Crétacé-Tertiaire en faciès continental dans le versant nord des Pyrénées". Géologie Méditerranéenne. 10 (3–4): 269–276.
- Brochu, C. A. (2004). "A new Late Cretaceous gavialoid crocodylian from eastern North America and the phylogenetic relationships of Thoracosaurs". Journal of Vertebrate Paleontology. 24 (3): 610–633. doi:10.1671/0272-4634(2004)024[0610:ANLCGC]2.0.CO;2.
- Buffetaut, E. (2008). "Late Cretaceous pterosaurs from France: a review" (PDF). Zitteliana, Series B. 28: 249–255. doi:10.5282/ubm/epub.12020.
- Buffetaut, E.; Laurent, Y.; Le Loeuff, J.; Bilotte, M. (1997). "A terminal Cretaceous giant pterosaur from the French Pyrenees". Geological Magazine. 134 (4): 553–556. doi:10.1017/S0016756897007449.
- Cappetta, H.; Corral, J. C. (1999). "Upper Maastrichtian selachians from the Condado de Treviño (Basque-Cantabrian region, Iberian Peninsula)". Estudios del Museo de Ciencias Naturales de Álava. (Número Especial 1): 339–372.
- Csiki-Sava, Z.; Buffetaut, E.; Ősi, A.; Pereda-Suberbiola, X.; Brusatte, S.L. (2015). "Island life in the Cretaceous-faunal composition, biostratigraphy, evolution, and extinction of land-living vertebrates on the Late Cretaceous European archipelago". ZooKeys (469): 1–161. doi:10.3897/zookeys.469.8439. PMC 4296572. PMID 25610343.
- Garcia, G.; Amicot, S.; Fournier, F.; Thouand, E.; Valentin, X. (2010). "A new Titanosaur genus (Dinosauria, Sauropoda) from the Late Cretaceous of southern France and its paleobiogeographic implications". Bulletin de la Société Géologique de France. 181 (3): 269–277. doi:10.2113/gssgfbull.181.3.269.
- Garcia, G.; Bardet, N.; Houssaye, A.; Pereda-Suberbiola, X.; Valentin, X. (2015). "Mosasauroid (Squamata) discovery in the Late Cretaceous (Early Campanian) continental deposits of Villeveyrac-L'Olivet, Southern France – Découverte de Mosasauroidea (Squamata) dans le Crétacé supérieur (Campanien inférieur) continental de Villeveyrac – L'Olivet, sud de la France". Comptes Rendus Palevol. 14 (6–7): 495–505. doi:10.1016/j.crpv.2015.05.002.
- Gheerbrant, E.; Abrial, C.; Cappetta, H. (1997). "Nouveaux sites à microvertébrés continentaux du Crétacé terminal des Petites Pyrénées (Haute-Garonne et Ariège, France)". Geobios. 20: 257–269. doi:10.1016/S0016-6995(97)80031-9.
- Gheerbrant, E.; Allain, R.; Laurent, Y. (2026). "First evidence of co-occurrence of multituberculate and eutherian mammals in the Cretaceous of Western Europe – palaeobiogeographical implications". Geological Magazine. 163 e25. doi:10.1017/S0016756826100673.
- Isasmendi, E.; Malafaia, E. (2025). "New contributions to the knowledge of Abelisauridae (Dinosauria, Theropoda) from the Upper Cretaceous Ibero-Armorican landmass". Ameghiniana. 62 (6): 452–479. doi:10.5710/AMGH.17.10.2025.3660.
- Kriwet, J.; Soler-Gijón, R.; López-Martínez, N. (2007). "Neoselachians from the Upper Campanian and Lower Maastrichtian (Upper Cretaceous) of the southern Pyrenees, northern Spain". Palaeontology. 50 (5): 1051–1071. doi:10.1111/j.1475-4983.2007.00695.x.
- Laurent, Y. (2003). "Les faunes de vertébrés continentaux du Maastrichtien supérieur d'Europe : systématique et biodiversité". Strata. 41: 1–81.
- Laurent, Y.; Bilotte, M.; Le Loeuff, J. (2002). "Late Maastrichtian continental vertebrates from southwestern France: correlation with marine fauna". Palaeogeography, Palaeoclimatology, Palaeoecology. 187 (1–2): 121–135. Bibcode:2002PPP...187..121L. doi:10.1016/S0031-0182(02)00512-6.
- Laurent, Y.; Buffetaut, E.; Le Loeuff, J. (2000). "Un crâne de Thoracosaurine (Crocodylia, Crocodylidae) dans le Maastrichtien supérieur du sud de la France" (PDF). Oryctos. 3: 19–27.
- Laurent, Y.; Tong, H.; Claude, J. (2002). "New side-necked turtle (Pleurodira: Bothremydidae) from the Upper Maastrichtian of the Petites-Pyrénées (Haute-Garonne, France)". Cretaceous Research. 23 (4): 465–471. doi:10.1006/cres.2002.1015.
- Lepicard, B. (1985). "Le Crétacé terminal et le Paléocène basal dans les Petites-Pyrénées et les Dômes annexes. Biostratigraphie-Sédimentologie". Strata. 4: 1–276.
- Longrich, N.R.; Pereda-Suberbiola, X.; Pyron, R.A.; Jalil, N-E (2021). "The first duckbill dinosaur (Hadrosauridae: Lambeosaurinae) from Africa and the role of oceanic dispersal in dinosaur biogeography". Cretaceous Research. 120 104678. Bibcode:2021CrRes.12004678L. doi:10.1016/j.cretres.2020.104678. S2CID 228807024.
- Martin, J.; Delfino, M.; Garcia, G.; Godefroit, P.; Berton, S.; Valentin, X. (2016). "New specimens of Allodaposuchus precedens from France: intraspecific variability and the diversity of European Late Cretaceous eusuchians". Zoological Journal of the Linnean Society. 176: 607–631. doi:10.1111/zoj.12331.
- Pérez-García, A.; Ortega, F.; Murelaga, X. (2012). "A new genus of Bothremydidae (Chelonii, Pleurodira) in the Cretaceous of southwestern Europe". Geobios. 45 (2): 219–229. doi:10.1016/j.geobios.2011.03.001.
- Pérez-García, A.; Ortega, F.; Murelaga, X. (2021). "Iberoccitanemys atlanticum (Lapparent de Broin & Murelaga, 1996) n. comb.: new data on the diversity and paleobiogeographic distributions of the Campanian-Maastrichtian bothremydid turtles of Europe" (PDF). Comptes Rendus Palevol. 20 (32): 667–676. doi:10.5852/cr-palevol2021v20a32.
- Prieto-Márquez, A.; Dalla Vecchia, F.M.; Gaete, R.; Galobart, À. (2013). "Diversity, Relationships, and Biogeography of the Lambeosaurine Dinosaurs from the European Archipelago, with Description of the New Aralosaurin Canardia garonnensis". PLOS ONE. 8 (7) e69835. Bibcode:2013PLoSO...869835P. doi:10.1371/journal.pone.0069835. PMC 3724916. PMID 23922815.
- Ramírez-Velasco, A.A. (2022). "Phylogenetic and biogeography analysis of Mexican hadrosauroids". Cretaceous Research. 138: 1–14. doi:10.1016/j.cretres.2022.105267.
- Thomas, H.N.; McDavid, S.N. (2025). "Enter the dragons: the phylogeny of Azhdarchoidea (Pterosauria: Pterodactyloidea) and the evolution of giant size in pterosaurs" (PDF). Journal of Systematic Palaeontology. 23 (1): 1–47. doi:10.1080/14772019.2025.2569368.
