= Lestaillats Marls Formation =

- Stratigraphic range: Late Cretaceous (early Late Maastrichtian; ~69–68 Ma
- Type: Geological formation
- Unit of: Ausseing Group
- Underlies: Calcarenites du Jadet Formation
- Overlies: Nankin 2 Limestones Formation
- Thickness: ~ 20 m (66 ft)

Lithology
- Primary: Marls

Location
- Coordinates: 43°11′N 1°01′E
- Region: Occitania
- Country: France
- Lestaillats Marls Formation (France) Lestaillats Marls Formation (Occitanie) Lestaillats Marls Formation (Haute-Garonne)

The Lestaillats Marls Formation (Formation des marnes de Lestaillats) is a geological formation in southwestern France whose layers date back to the early late Maastrichtian, approximately 69 to 68 million years ago. It consists of dark marls deposited in a coastal marsh area. Dinosaur remains are among the fossils that have been recovered from the formation, although none have yet been referred to a specific genus.

== Location ==
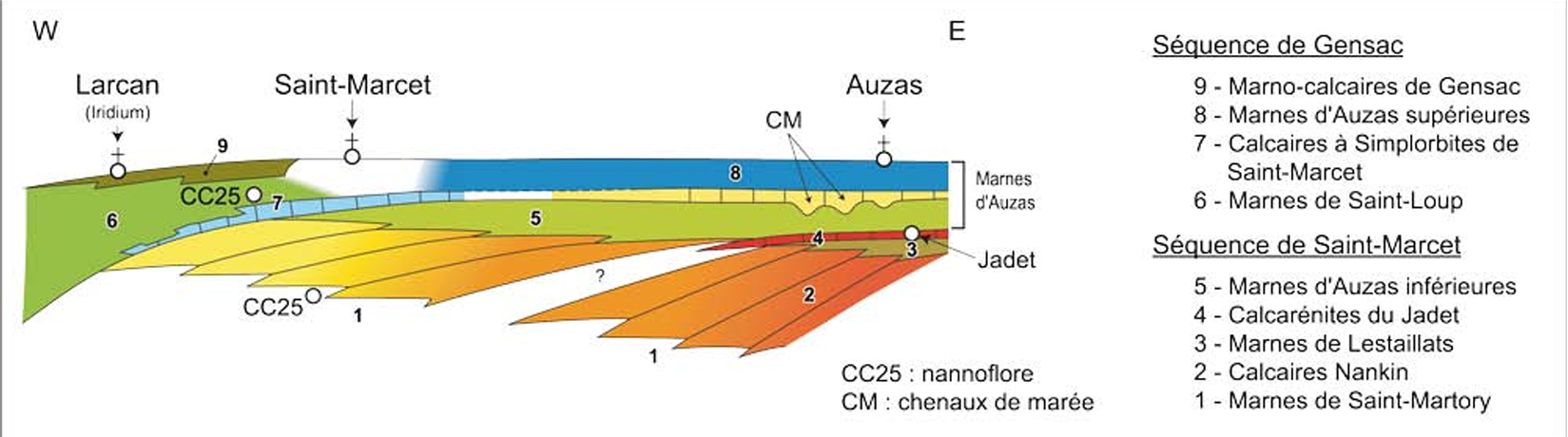
Location of the Lestaillats Marls Formation within the Maastrichtian deposits organization of the Petites-Pyrénées (Haute-Garonne)

The Lestaillats Marls Formation first appeared in the scientific literature in 1999. This formation had not been distinguished in earlier studies, and the vertebrate fossils discovered there in the early 1990s were initially attributed to the Marnes d'Auzas Formation.

The Lestaillats Marls Formation is located in the Plagne anticline in the central part of the Haute-Garonne department (Petites Pyrénées) in Occitania region. As this region is covered with very dense vegetation, outcrops of this formation have mainly been studied in active or abandoned quarries located in particular near the villages of Mauran and Ausseing.

The Lestaillats Marls Formation is the second of the three formations of the Ausseing Group. It overlies conformably the Nankin 2 Limestones Formation and is overlain conformably by the Calcarenites du Jadet Formation. The Lestaillats Marls Formation corresponds to a more continental environment (estuarine marsh) than that of the two underlying and overlying formations deposited in a shallow marine environment.This tripartite subdivision is only present in the Plagne and Saint-Martory anticlines. In the Aurignac anticline, located to the north of the two previous ones, the Lestaillats marls are absent and the layers equivalent to the Ausseing Group are designated as Nankin limestones facies.

== Lithostratigraphy and depositional environment ==
The Lestaillats Marls Formation reaches approximately 20 m (66 ft) in thickness and is composed solely of gray to black marls, rich in organic matter, and highly bioturbated. These marls can be more or less indurated and contain lignites. The richness of organic matter (indicating a reducing environment), the overabundance of cynenid bivalves (indicator of an environment with variable salinity), the joint presence of euryhaline marine and freshwater fish, plant remains and terrestrial reptiles, make it possible to reconstruct a depositional environment corresponding to an estuarine marsh area.

The Lestaillats Marls Formation was deposited on the west coast of the former Ibero-Armorican island, which included a large part of France and the Iberian Peninsula.. The rocks of the Ausseing Group and the overlying Marnes d'Auzas Formation show the alternation of shallow marine sediments and coastal continental deposits (estuarine and fluvial) corresponding to sea level fluctuations and shoreline shifts during the Late Maastrichtian in this part of the Ibero-Armorican island.

== Fossil content ==
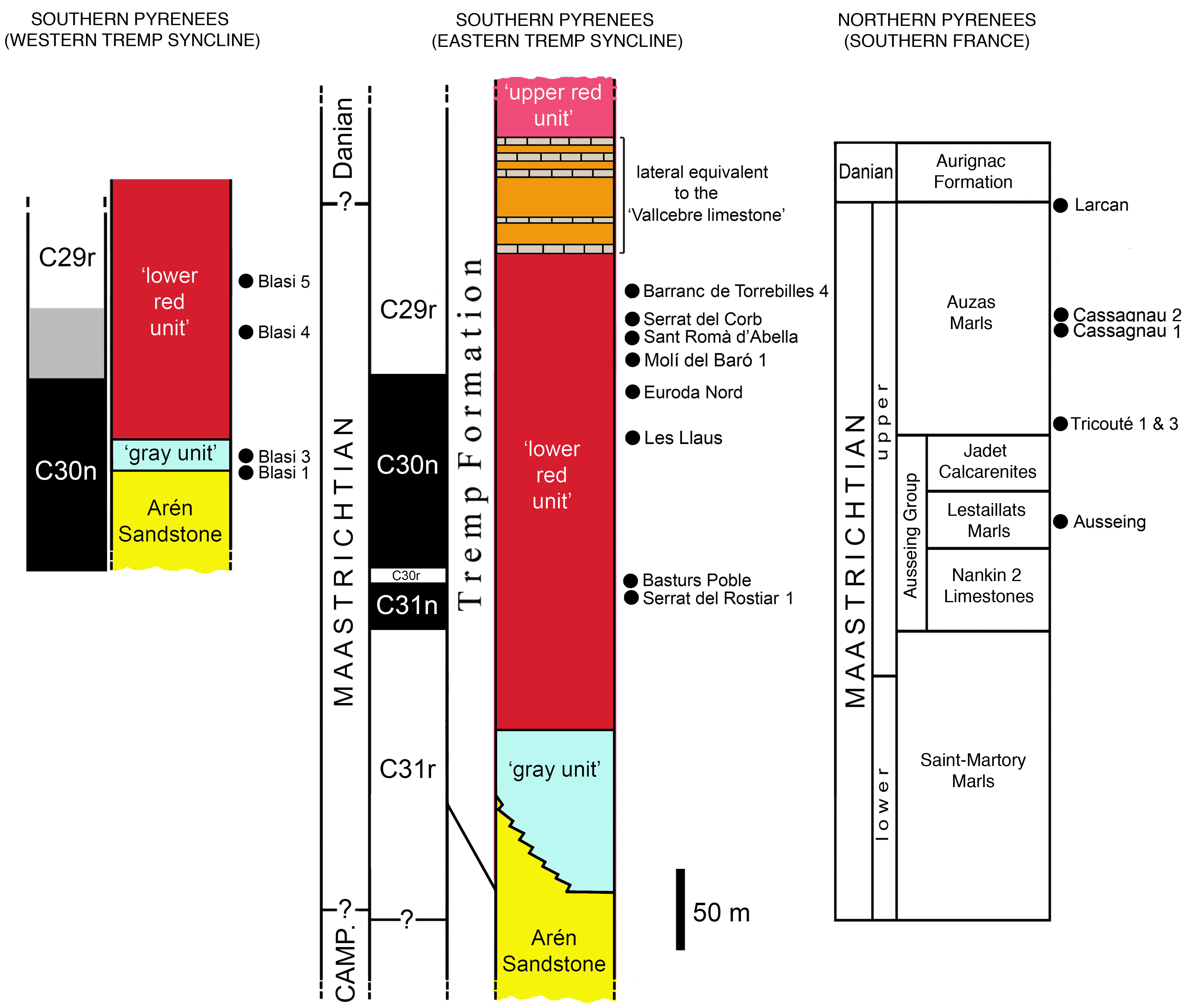
Stratigraphic distribution of lambeosaurine dinosaurs localities in the Pyrenees, including the Lestaillats Marls Formation.

The first vertebrate fossils from the Lestaillats Marls Formation were discovered in 1993 at the Lestaillats 1 site near the village of Mauran in the basal part of the formation. Two excavation campaigns carried out in 1994 and 1997 by a team of the Musée des dinosaures d’Espéraza unearthed numerous vertebrate remains. Other specimens come from the Lestaillats 2 site discovered in 1994. Another site located in the middle part of the formation was discovered in 1997 near the village of Ausseing and excavated in 2000 by the same team. It also yielded a diverse fauna.

The most common vertebrate fossils from the formation belong to undetermined hadrosaurid dinosaurs. Most of the available hadrosaur bones do not allow their definitive attribution to a particular hadrosaur clade, with the exception of an ischium from the Ausseing site which shows characteristics of Lambeosaurinae. Lambeosaurines are the only known Hadrosaurids from the Ibero-Armorican domain and it is likely that the other hadrosaur remains from the Lestaillats Marls Formation belong to this clade. The very good state of preservation of their bones reveals that they did not undergo significant transport before their burial, which indicates that these hadrosaurs probably lived in the tidal plain in which their remains were found. Most of the hadrosaur bones unearthed show bite marks, particularly on the neural spines of several dorsal vertebrae, ischia, as well as on one femur, revealing that the bodies of these specimens were consumed by crocodiles or theropod dinosaurs.

Color key: Taxon / Reclassified taxon / Taxon falsely reported as present / Dubious taxon or junior synonym / Ichnotaxon / Ootaxon / Morphotaxon	Notes; Uncertain or tentative taxa are in small text; ~~crossed out~~ taxa are discredited.

=== Dinosaurs ===
==== Ornithischians ====
===== Ankylosaurs =====
Ankylosaurs of the Lestaillats Marls Formation
Genus	Species	Location	Stratigraphic position	Material	Notes	Image
Struthiosaurini indet.	Indeterminate	Lestaillats 1	Lower	MDE-Les-69, osteoderm (smal scute); MDE-Les-09, osteoderm (oval keeled plate); MDE-Les-68, osteoderm (oval keeled plate)	A struthiosaurin nodosauridae	

===== Hadrosaurs =====
Hadrosaurs of the Lestaillats Marls Formation
Genus	Species	Location	Stratigraphic position	Material	Notes	Image
Hadrosauridae indet.	Indeterminate	Lestaillats 1	Lower	MDE-LES-73, a dentary tooth; MDE-Les-06, a complete dorsal vertebra; MDE-Les-07, a complete dorsal vertebra; MDE-Les-08, a complete dorsal vertebra; MDE-Les-14, a dorsal rib; MDE-Les-25, a complete left scapula; MDE-Les-04, a complete caudal vertebra; MDE-Les-05, a complete caudal vertebra; MDE-Les-20, a complete caudal vertebra; MDE-Les-03, an incomplete left pubis; MDE-Les-01,19, two incomplete ischia belonging probably to the same individual; MDE-Les-02, an incomplete ischium (which is more robust and less laterally flattened than the other two); A squamosal and an anterior fragment of a maxilla are cited (but not figured) by Laurent and colleagues.	The slender shape of the scapula, with its two extremities of equal width (a dominant morphology in Hadrosaurinae, although there are exceptions), suggests a different taxon from the lambeosaurine Canardia found in the same region in the younger strata of the Marnes d'Auzas Formation. In the latter, the scapular blade is shorter, its distal end being wider dorsoventrally than its proximal end, a typical characteristic of most lambeosaurines, although there are also exceptions. (Note: The lambeosaurine Lambeosaurus lambei has a scapula more similar to that of the Hadrosaurinae. Among the Ibero-Armorican lambeosaurines, a scapular blade distally not enlarged has been reported in 2019 in Adynomosaurus.) The dorsal and caudal vertebrae have very tall neural spines, (Note: In the caudal vertebra MDE-Les-04, whose neural spine measures 20.5 centimetres (8 in), the heigh/width ratio of the neural spine is 6.4, a condition closer to that of the lambeosaurine Hypacrosaurus (which is 7) than that of the hadrosaurine Edmontosaurus (which is 2). In the caudal vertebra MDE-Les-20, this ratio is 5.6.) a feature more common (but not exclusive) in lambeosaurines. A dentary tooth of the Lestaillats hadrosaurid has a crown with a median carina but without a secondary carina.. This tooth therefore differs from the dentary teeth of Canardia which have a main carina slightly offset posteriorly relative to the axis of the tooth (asymmetrical position) and which are equipped with a thin secondary carina located anterior to the main carina. (Note: However, Prieto-Márquez et al. demonstrated that although most lambeosaurines had teeth bearing an accessory ridge in addition to the median carina, as in Corythosaurus casuarius, C. intermedius and Lambeosaurus lambei, at least one individual of each of these three well-known species has teeth lacking accessory ridges and teeth with less pronounced ridges than in other known specimens of the species (irregularly developed ridges along the entire apicobasal length and with very little relief).)	Hadrosaurid left scapula (MDE-Les-25) from Lestaillats 1. Hadrosaurid dorsal vertebrae (MDE-Les-06 and 07) from Lestaillats 1. Hadrosaurid pubis (MDE-Les-03) and ischium (MDE-Les-19), and caudal vertebrae from Lestaillats 1 in left lateral view. Hadrosaurid caudal vertebra (MDE-Les-04) from Lestaillats 1 in anterior view. Hadrosaurid caudal vertebrae (from left to right MDE-Les-20, 05 and 04) from Lestaillats 1 in right lateral view.
Hadrosauridae indet.	Indeterminate	Lestaillats 2	Lower	MDE-Les2-10A proximal half of a right femur.	Shows numerous bite marks	
Hadrosauridae indet.	Indeterminate	Ausseing	Middle	MDE-Aus-160, a cervical rib; MDE-Aus-01, a nearly complete right femur (57.5 centimetres (23 in) in length); MDE-Aus-03, a left tibia (60 centimetres (24 in) in length); MDE-Aus-09, a right fibula (49.5 centimetres (19 in) in length); MDE-Aus-184, a left metatarsal IV; MDE-Aus-47, an ungual phalanx; Fragmentary teeth and lower jaw are also cited but not figured.		
Lambeosaurinae indet.	Indeterminate	Ausseing	Middle	MDE-Aus-185, a nearly complete left ischium (68 centimetres (27 in) in length)	In 2013, Prieto-Márquez et al. identified diagnostic lambeosaurines features in the left ischium MDE-Aus-185 (iliac process with dorsal margin caudally recurved producing a “thumb-like” lateral profile). (Note: The iliac process of the three ischial bones from the Lestaillats 1 site is incomplete, which prevents any attributing to either of the two main clades of hadrosaurids..). The other hadrosaur remains from the Ausseing site reported by Yves Laurent in 2003 may belong to the same taxon.	Lambeosaurine left ischium (MDE-Aus-185) from Ausseing.

==== Saurischians ====
===== Sauropods =====
Sauropods of the Lestaillats Marls Formation
Genus	Species	Location	Stratigraphic position	Material	Notes	Image
Titanosauria indet.	Indeterminate	Ausseing	Middle	MDE-Aus-129, a right tibia (56.5 centimetres (22 in) in length) with both ends incomplete; MDE-Aus-177, a metacarpal		

===== Theropods =====
Theropods of the Lestaillats Marls Formation
Genus	Species	Location	Stratigraphic position	Material	Notes	Image
Theropoda indet.	Indeterminate	Lestaillats 1	Lower	MDE-Les-76, an incomplete tooth	Possibly an indeterminate dromaeosaurid	

=== Crocodilians ===
Crocodilians of the Lestaillats Marls Formation
Genus	Species	Location	Stratigraphic position	Material	Notes	Image
Crocodyliformes indet.	Indeterminate	Lestaillats 1 and 2, Ausseing	Lower and Middle	Teeth (including MDE-Aus-187, osteoderms (including MDE-Aus-06 and 112)		
Thoracosaurus	Indeterminate	Ausseing	Middle	Teeth		
Musturzabalsuchus?	Indeterminate	Ausseing	Middle	MDE-Aus-230 and 124, teeth	A probable Allodaposuchidae eusuchian	
Acynodon	A. cf. iberoccitanus	Ausseing	Middle	MDE-Aus-74, anterior spatulate tooth; MDE-Aus-77, posterior globular tooth; MDE-Aus-71, posterior globular tooth	A hylaeochampsid eusuchian	

=== Squamates ===
Squamates of the Lestaillats Marls Formation
Genus	Species	Location	Stratigraphic position	Material	Notes	Image
Lacertilia indet.	Indeterminate	Ausseing	Middle	Vertebrae (including MDE-Aus-254)		
Scincomorpha indet.	Indeterminate	Ausseing	Middle	MDE-Aus-255, a dentary bearing teeth		

=== Turtles ===
Turtles of the Lestaillats Marls Formation
Genus	Species	Location	Stratigraphic position	Material	Notes	Image
Pleurodira indet.	Indeterminate	Lestaillats 1 and 2	Lower	MDE-Les-15, xiphiplastron ; dermal plates		
Pleurodira indet.	Indeterminate	Ausseing	Middle	MDE-Aus-10, a scapulocoracoid; MDE-Aus-133, epiplastron; MDE-Aus-214, hyoplastron; MDE-Aus-136, hyoplastron; MDE-Aus-29, xiphiplastron with pubis and ischium; MDE-Aus-146, xiphiplastron; MDE-Aus-56 and 58, peripheral plates; MDE-Aus-14 and 118 pleural plates; MDE-Aus-51 and 88 neural plates		
Foxemys?	Indeterminate	Ausseing	Middle	MDE-Aus-18, entoplastron	A bothremydid turtle	
Solemys?	Indeterminate	Ausseing	Middle	MDE-Aus-16 and 183, dermal plates	A helochelydrid turtle	

=== Amphibians ===
Amphibians of the Lestaillats Marls Formation
Genus	Species	Location	Stratigraphic position	Material	Notes	Image
Albanerpetontidae indet.	Indeterminate	Ausseing	Middle	MDE-Aus-251, a dentary fragment bearing seven teeth		
Discoglossidae indet.	Indeterminate	Ausseing	Middle	MDE-Aus-252, distal end of a humerus; MDE-Aus-253, skull roof fragment		

=== Fish ===
Fish of the Lestaillats Marls Formation
Genus	Species	Location	Stratigraphic position	Material	Notes	Image
Chondrichthyes indet.	Indeterminate	Lestaillats 1 and 2	Lower	Teeth (including MDE-Les2-09)		
Osteichthyes indet.	Indeterminate	Ausseing	Middle	Vertebrae		
Lepisosteidae indet.	Indeterminate	Lestaillats 1, Ausseing	Lower and Middle	MDE-Les-67 and MDE-Aus-250, ganoid scales; MDE-Aus-242, vertebra		
cf. Lepisosteus?	Indeterminate	Ausseing	Middle	Teeth (including MDE-Aus-243)		
cf. Atractosteus?	Indeterminate	Ausseing	Middle	Teeth (including MDE-Aus-244)		
Phyllodontidae indet.	Indeterminate	Lestaillats 1 and 2, Ausseing	Lower and Middle	Teeth (including MDE-Aus-245)		
Phyllodontinae indet.	Indeterminate	Lestaillats 2	Lower	MDE-Les2-06, a partial tooth plate		
Amiidae indet.	Indeterminate	Ausseing	Middle	Tooth plates (including MDE-Aus-246) ; vertebrae (including MDE-Aus-247)		
cf. Palaeolabrus?	Indeterminate	Ausseing	Middle	MDE-Aus-248, a tooth plate		
Sparidae? indet.	Indeterminate	Lestaillats 1 and 2, Ausseing	Lower and Middle	Teeth (including MDE-Aus-249)		

== Bibliography ==
- Bilotte, M. (1985). "Le Crétacé supérieur des plates-formes est-pyrénéennes". Strata. 5: 1–438.
- Csiki-Sava, Z.; Buffetaut, E.; Ősi, A.; Pereda-Suberbiola, X.; Brusatte, S.L. (2015). "Island life in the Cretaceous-faunal composition, biostratigraphy, evolution, and extinction of land-living vertebrates on the Late Cretaceous European archipelago". ZooKeys (469): 1–161. doi:10.3897/zookeys.469.8439. PMC 4296572. PMID 25610343.
- Laurent, Y. (2003). "Les faunes de vertébrés continentaux du Maastrichtien supérieur d'Europe : systématique et biodiversité". Strata. 41: 1–81.
- Laurent, Y.; Bilotte, M.; Le Loeuff, J. (2002). "Late Maastrichtian continental vertebrates from southwestern France: correlation with marine fauna". Palaeogeography, Palaeoclimatology, Palaeoecology. 187 (1–2): 121–135. Bibcode:2002PPP...187..121L. doi:10.1016/S0031-0182(02)00512-6.
- Laurent, Y.; Cavin, L.; Bilotte, M. (1999). "Découverte d'un gisement à vertébrés dans le Maastrichtien supérieur des Petites-Pyrénées". Comptes Rendus de l’Académie des Sciences. 328: 781–787. doi:10.1016/S1251-8050(99)80171-2.
- Lepicard, Béatrice (1985). "Le Crétacé terminal et le Paléocène basal dans les Petites-Pyrénées et les Dômes annexes. Biostratigraphie-Sédimentologie". Strata. Série 2. 4: 1–276.
- Prieto-Márquez, A.; Dalla Vecchia, F.M.; Gaete, R.; Galobart, À. (2013). "Diversity, Relationships, and Biogeography of the Lambeosaurine Dinosaurs from the European Archipelago, with Description of the New Aralosaurin Canardia garonnensis". PLOS ONE. 8 (7) e69835. Bibcode:2013PLoSO...869835P. doi:10.1371/journal.pone.0069835. PMC 3724916. PMID 23922815.
- Prieto-Márquez, A.; Fondevilla, V.; Sellés, A.G.; Wagner, J.R.; Galobart, Á. (2019). "Adynomosaurus arcanus, a new lambeosaurine dinosaur from the Late Cretaceous Ibero-Armorican Island of the European Archipelago". Cretaceous Research. 96: 19–37. doi:10.1016/j.cretres.2018.12.002.

== Books ==
- Buffetaut, Eric (1995). "Les dinosaures du Crétacé supérieur". In Buffetaut, E. (ed.). Dinosaures de France (in French). BRGM. pp. 101–131. ISBN 2-7159-0766-4.

== See also ==
- List of dinosaur-bearing rock formations
  - List of stratigraphic units with indeterminate dinosaur fossils
