= Calcarenites du Jadet Formation =

Geologic formation in France

Jadet Calcarenites Formation
- Stratigraphic range: Late Cretaceous (Late Maastrichtian); ~69–68 Ma
- Type: Geological formation
- Underlies: Marnes d'Auzas Formation
- Overlies: Lestaillats Marls Formation
- Thickness: About 15 m (49 ft)

Lithology
- Primary: Calcarenites
- Other: Clay

Location
- Coordinates: 43°08′N 0°55′E
- Region: Occitania
- Country: France
- Calcarenites du Jadet Formation (France) Calcarenites du Jadet Formation (Occitanie) Calcarenites du Jadet Formation (Haute-Garonne)

The Calcarenites du Jadet Formation is a Mesozoic geologic formation in France. Dinosaur remains are among the fossils that have been recovered from the formation, although none have yet been referred to a specific genus.

== Location and geological context ==
The Jadet calcarenite formation is located in the Plagne and Saint-Martory anticlines (Note: The Saint-Martory anticline is also referred to as the Saint-Marcet anticline by Buffetaut and Cavin..) in the central part of the Haute-Garonne department (Petites Pyrénées) in Occitania region. As this region is covered with very dense vegetation, the outcrops of this formation have mainly been studied in abandoned or active quarries located particularly near the villages of Auzas, Laffite-Toupière, and Saint-Martory..

The Jadet calcarenite formation constitutes the top of the Ausseing Group. The latter also includes, in its middle part, the Lestaillats Marls Formation and, in its lower part, the Nankin 2 limestone Formation. The Jadet calcarenite formation is overlain by the Marnes d'Auzas Formation.. In the Aurignac anticline, located north of the Plagne and Saint-Martory anticlines, the layers equivalent to the Ausseing group do not show marly intercalation and are grouped under the name of Nankin facies limestones. ·

== Lithostratigraphy and depositional environment ==
The formation was studied in the 1980s in the Jadet quarry where the outcrops are virtually no longer visible today. In this quarry, the exposed part of the formation reached a thickness of approximately 15 m and consisted primarily of calcarenites. The quarry floor consisted of reddish-brown bioclastic calcarenites rich in bivalves and orbitoids. Next came 8 m of massive, reddish-brown to ochre sandy calcarenites, divided into two 4 m-thick sequences separated by a 30 to 50 cm-thick layer of green to red clays. These calcarenites contained thin lenses of red clay that graded laterally into alignments of soft pebbles outlining various internal structures, such as cross-stratification, low-angle oblique lamination, and—more rarely—planar parallel lamination. After a gap in visibility of approximately 1 m, the section ended with non-sandy, ochre-yellow calcarenites (3 m exposed) of tuffoid appearance, with parallel and then cross-bedding plane stratifications, and rare alignments of soft pebbles.

These sediments were deposited in a coastal environment under tidal influence (sandy foreshore, tidal channels, tidal marsh).

== Fossil content ==
The formation yielded marine invertebrates (bivalves, gastropods, echinoderms including the starfish Dipsacaster jadeti) as well as rare remains of marine and terrestrial vertebrates.

=== Vertebrates ===
==== Fish ====
Fishes of the Calcarenites du Jadet Formation
Genus	Species	Material	Notes	Images
Chondrichthyes indet.	Indeterminate	Teeth		
Enchodus indet.	E. cf. faujasi	A dentary fragment bearing four teeth		

==== Crocodilians ====
Crocodylia of the Calcarenites du Jadet Formation
Genus	Species	Material	Notes	Images
Crocodilia indet.	Indeterminate	A caudal vertebra		

==== Dinosaurs ====
Dinosauria of the Calcarenites du Jadet Formation
Genus	Species	Material	Notes	Images
Hadrosauridae indet.	Indeterminate	A partial left dentary		

== See also ==
- List of dinosaur-bearing rock formations
  - List of stratigraphic units with dinosaur trace fossils
    - Dinosaur eggs

== Bibliography ==
- Bilotte, Michel (2019). "La carrière du Jadet, site d'un faciès particulier du Calcaire nankin (Maastrichtien des Petites Pyrénées de la Haute-Garonne), dégradée par une exploitation mécanisé" (PDF). Bulletin de la Société d’Hisoire Naturelle de Toulouse. 155: 9–13.
- Breton, Gérard; Bilotte, Michel; Sigro, Georges (1995). "Dipsacaster jadeti sp. nov., Astropectinidae (Asteroidea, Echinodermata) du Maastrichtien des Petites Pyrénées (France)". Bulletin trimestriel de la Société géologique de Normandie et des amis du Muséum du Havre. 82 (4): 35–42.
- Buffetaut, Eric; Cavin, Lionel (1995). "Nouveaux restes de vertébrés du Maastrichtien supérieur de la carrière du Jadet (Saint-Martory, Haute-Garonne, France)". Bulletin trimestriel de la Société géologique de Normandie et des amis du Muséum du Havre. 82 (4): 31–34.
- Laurent, Yves; Bilotte, Michel; Le Loeuff, Jean (2002). "Late Maastrichtian continental vertebrates from southwestern France: correlation with marine fauna" (PDF). Palaeogeography, Palaeoclimatology, Palaeoecology. 187 (1–2): 121–135.
- Laurent, Yves (2003). "Les faunes de vertébrés continentaux du Maastrichtien supérieur d'Europe : systématique et biodiversité". Strata, Série 2. 41: 1–81.
- Lepicard, Béatrice (1985). "Le Crétacé terminal et le Paléocène basal dans les Petites-Pyrénées et les Dômes annexes. Biostratigraphie-Sédimentologie". Strata, Série 2. 4: 1–276.
- Paris, Jean-Pierre; Taquet, Philippe (March–April 1973). "Découverte d'un fragment de dentaire d'Hadrosaurien (Reptile Dinosaurien) dans le Crétacé supérieur des Petites Pyrénées (Haute-Garonne)". Bulletin du Muséum National d’Histoire Naturelle. 3 (130): 17–27.
