= Villalba de la Sierra Formation =

Geologic formation in Spain

- Stratigraphic range: Campanian-Maastrichtian; ~84–66 Ma
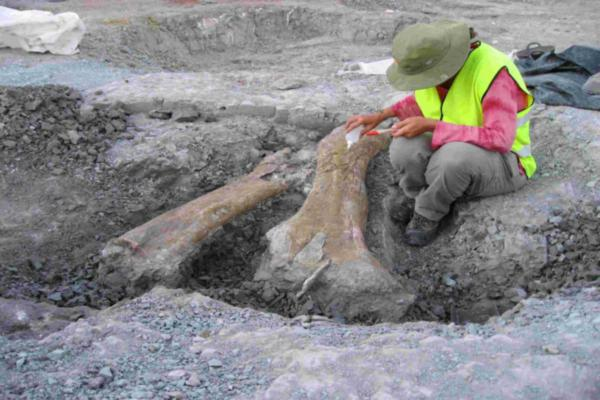
- Excavation of a titanosaur at Lo Hueco
- Type: Geological formation

Lithology
- Primary: Mudstone
- Other: Sandstone, gypsum

Location
- Coordinates: 40.0°N 2.0°W
- Approximate paleocoordinates: 30.7°N 0.6°W
- Region: Castilla-La Mancha
- Country: Spain
- Extent: Iberian Ranges

Type section
- Named for: Villalba de la Sierra
- Villalba de la Sierra Formation (Spain)

The Villalba de la Sierra Formation is a Campanian to Maastrichtian geologic formation in Spain. Fossil dinosaur eggs have been reported from the formation, that comprises gypsiferous, grey, argillaceous mudstones and sandstones, deposited in a floodplain environment characterised by high seasonality and variability in water availability.

== Fossil content ==
Color key: Taxon / Reclassified taxon / Taxon falsely reported as present / Dubious taxon or junior synonym / Ichnotaxon / Ootaxon / Morphotaxon	Notes; Uncertain or tentative taxa are in small text; ~~crossed out~~ taxa are discredited.

=== Dinosaur ===
==== Sauropods ====
Sauropods of the Villalba de la Sierra Formation
Taxon/ootaxon	Species/oospecies	Presence	Materials	Notes	Images
Lohuecotitan	L. pandafilandi	Lo Hueco.	A disarticulated partial skeleton	A titanosaurian sauropod	
Qunkasaura	Q. pintiquiniestra	Lo Hueco.	A partial skeleton belonging to a single individual.	A opisthocoelicaudiine saltasaurid; closely related to Abditosaurus kuehnei.	
Litosoolithus	L. poyosi	Poyos.	Multiple partial to almost complete eggs and clutches.	Very large fusioolithid titanosaurian eggs with very thin eggshells and dispersituberculated ornamentation.	
Fusioolithus	F. baghensis	Poyos.	Multiple partial to almost complete eggs and clutches.	Widespread fusioolithid titanosaurian eggs with ridged compactituberculated ornamentation.	
Megaloolithus	M. siruguei	Portilla.	Isolated eggshells.	European megaloolithid titanosaurian eggs with thick eggshells and compactituberculated ornamentation.	

==== Theropods ====
Theropods of the Villalba de la Sierra Formation
Taxon	Species	Presence	Materials	Notes	Images
Abelisauridae indet.	Indeterminate	Poyos	Teeth, cranial and postcranial elements	An abelisaurid theropod; closely related to Arcovenator escotae.	
Velociraptorinae indet.	Indeterminate			A velociraptorine dromaeosaurid	

=== Reptiles ===
==== Crocodiles ====
Crocodiles of the Villalba de la Sierra Formation
Taxon	Species	Presence	Materials	Notes	Images
Agaresuchus	A. fontisensis			A allodaposuchid eusuchian	
Lohuecosuchus	L. megadontos			A allodaposuchid eusuchian	
Musturzabalsuchus	M. sp			A allodaposuchid eusuchian	

==== Turtles ====
Turtles of the Villalba de la Sierra Formation
Taxon	Species	Presence	Materials	Notes	Images
Foxemys	F. mechinorum			A bothremydid side-necked turtle	
Iberoccitanemys	I. convenarum			A bothremydid side-necked turtle	

== See also ==
- List of dinosaur-bearing rock formations
  - List of stratigraphic units with few dinosaur genera
    - Dinosaur eggs
