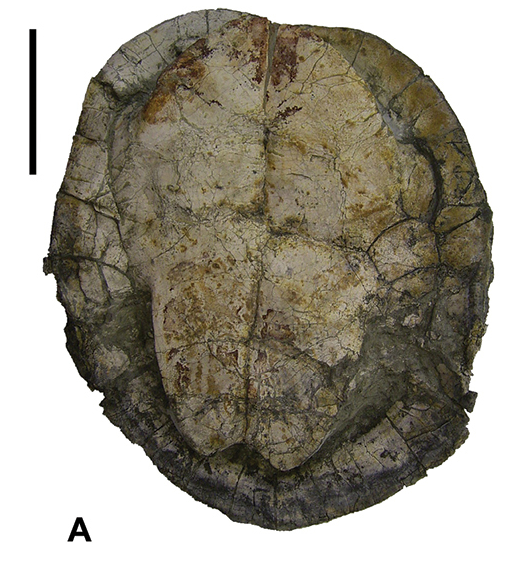
- Complete shell (HUE-4913) of I. convenarum from the Villalba de la Sierra Formation

Scientific classification
- Domain: Eukaryota
- Kingdom: Animalia
- Phylum: Chordata
- Class: Reptilia
- Order: Testudines
- Suborder: Pleurodira
- Family: †Bothremydidae
- Genus: †Iberoccitanemys; Perez-Garcia, Ortega, & Murelaga, 2012

Species
- †Iberoccitanemys convenarum Perez-Garcia, Ortega, & Murelaga, 2012; †Iberoccitanemys atlanticum Perez-Garcia, Ortega, & Murelaga, 2021

= Iberoccitanemys =

Iberoccitanemys Temporal range: Late Cretaceous, Campanian–Maastrichtian

Genus of extinct turtles

Iberoccitanemys (meaning "Iberoccitanian turtle") is an extinct genus of turtle from the Bothremydidae that is known from the Marnes d'Auzas Formation in France, and also the Sobrepena Formation and Villalba de la Sierra Formation in Spain.

== Discovery and naming ==
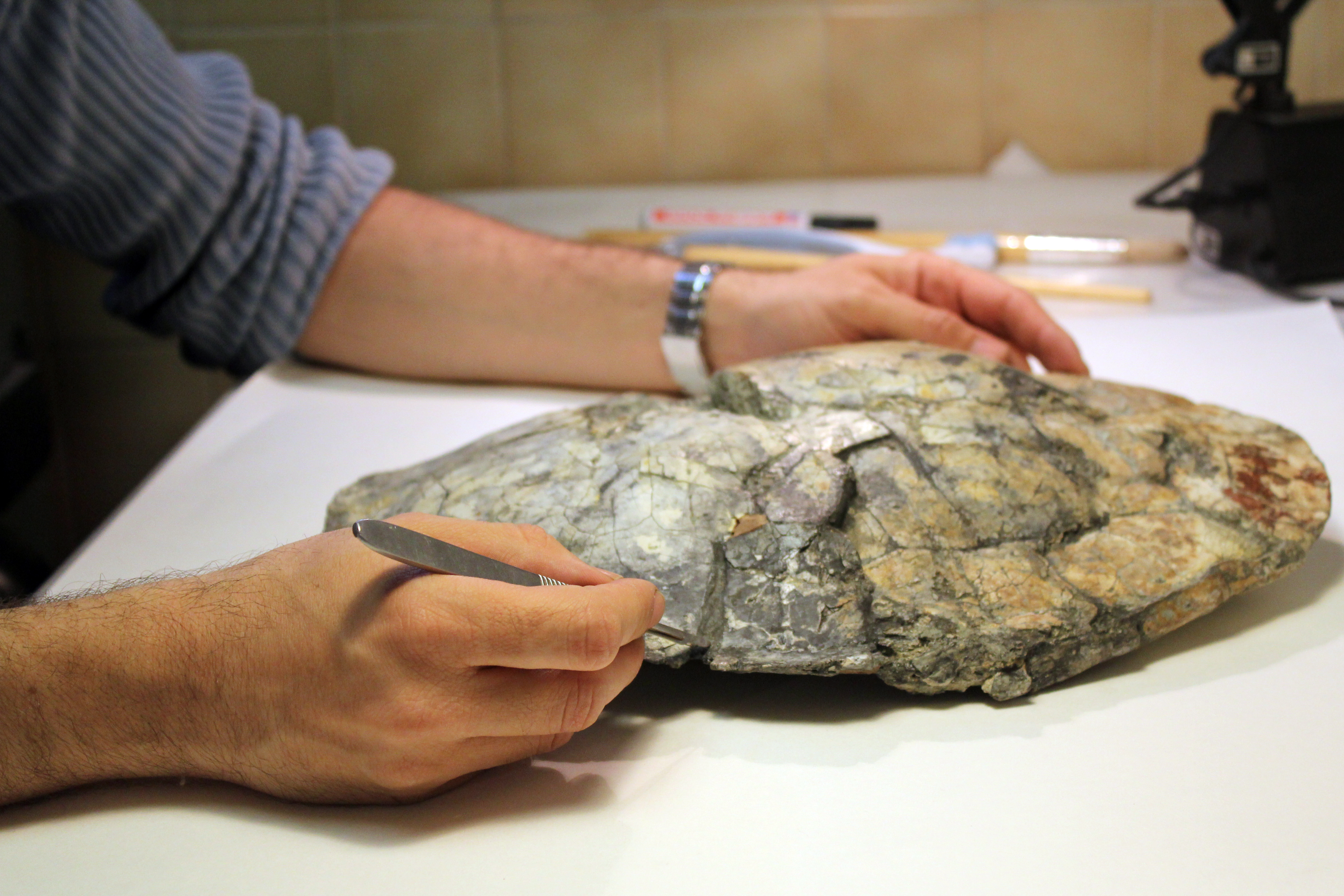
Fossil during preparation

Two species are known: I. convenarum (the type) and I. atlanticum, which were both referred to other genera before being moved to Iberoccitanemys; the genus was named by Perez-Garcia, Ortega & Murelaga (2012).

The type species, I. convenarum, was initially placed within Elochelys as E. convenarum by Laurent, Tong & Claude (2002). It was moved to Iberoccitanemys when the genus was named in 2012 and is based on the holotype, MDEt Cas2-259, a nearly complete shell from the Marnes d'Auzas Formation in France.

The second species, I. atlanticum, was initially placed within Polysternon as P. atlanticum by de Lapparent de Broin & Murelaga (1996). P. atlanticum was redescribed as a species of Iberoccitanemys by Perez-Garcia, Ortega & Murelaga (2021). The holotype is MCNA 6316, from the Sobrepena Formation in Spain.
