= Saint-Martory station =

Railway station in Occitanie, France

Saint-Martory

General information
- Location: Saint-Martory, Haute-Garonne; Occitanie, France
- Coordinates: 43°08′18″N 0°56′01″E
- Line: Toulouse–Bayonne railway
- Platforms: 2
- Tracks: 2

Other information
- Station code: 87611103

History
- Opened: 9 June 1862

Services
Preceding station	TER Occitanie	Following station
Saint-Gaudens towards Pau	15	Boussens towards Toulouse
Location

Saint-Martory is a railway station in Saint-Martory, Occitanie, France. The station is on the Toulouse–Bayonne railway line. The station is served by TER (local) services operated by the SNCF.

== Train services ==
The following services currently call at Saint-Martory:

- local service (TER Occitanie) Toulouse–Saint-Gaudens–Tarbes–Pau
