= Villalba de la Sierra =

Villalba de la Sierra, Spain
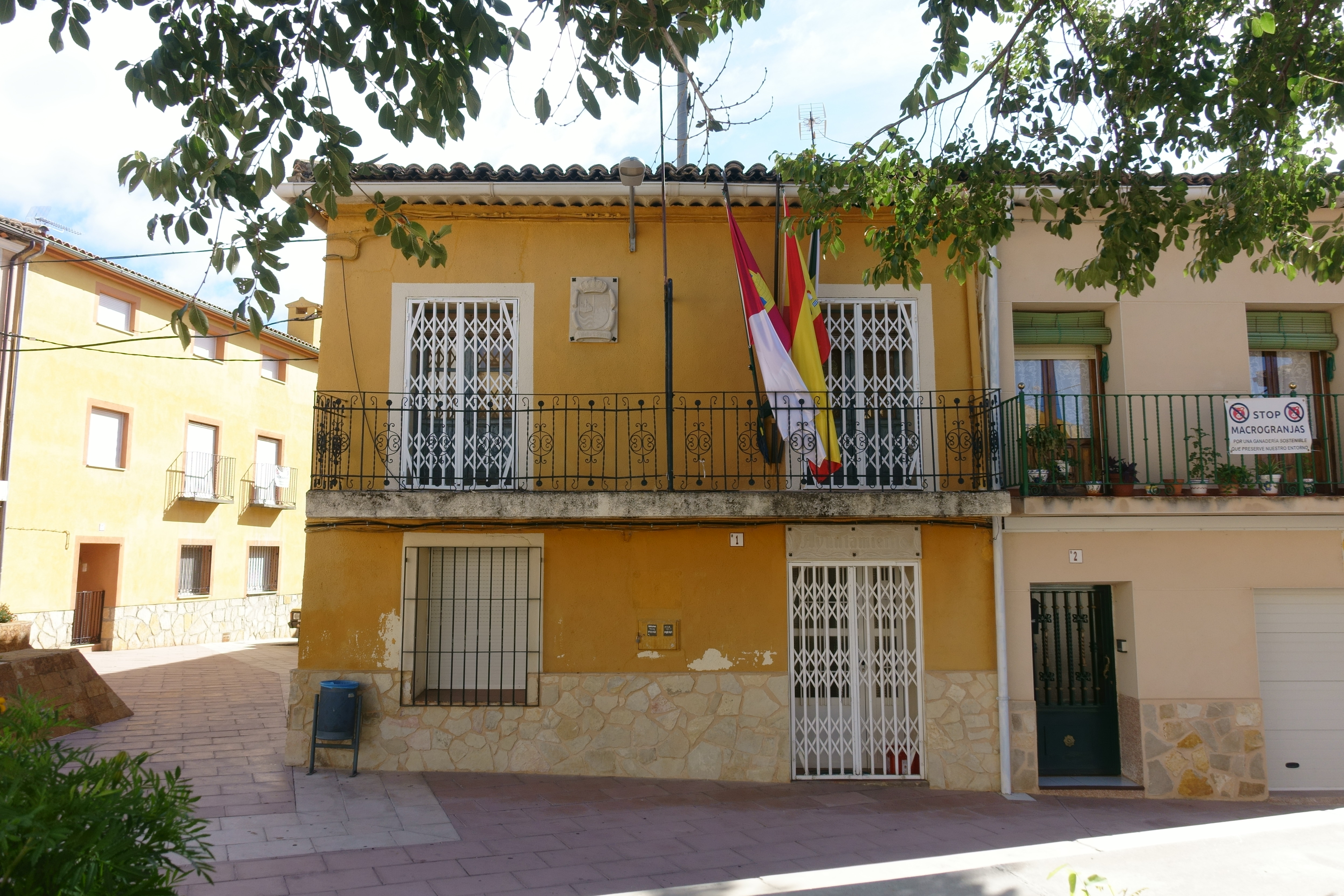

- Flag Coat of arms

- Location within Spain Location within Castilla-La Mancha
- Country: Spain
- Autonomous community: Castile-La Mancha
- Province: Cuenca
- Municipality: Villalba de la Sierra

Area
  - Total: 40 km^{2} (15 sq mi)

Population (2025-01-01)
  - Total: 569
  - Density: 14/km^{2} (37/sq mi)
- Time zone: UTC+1 (CET)
  - Summer (DST): UTC+2 (CEST)

Villalba de la Sierra is a municipality located in the province of Cuenca, Castile-La Mancha, Spain. According to the 2004 census (INE), the municipality has a population of 616 inhabitants.
