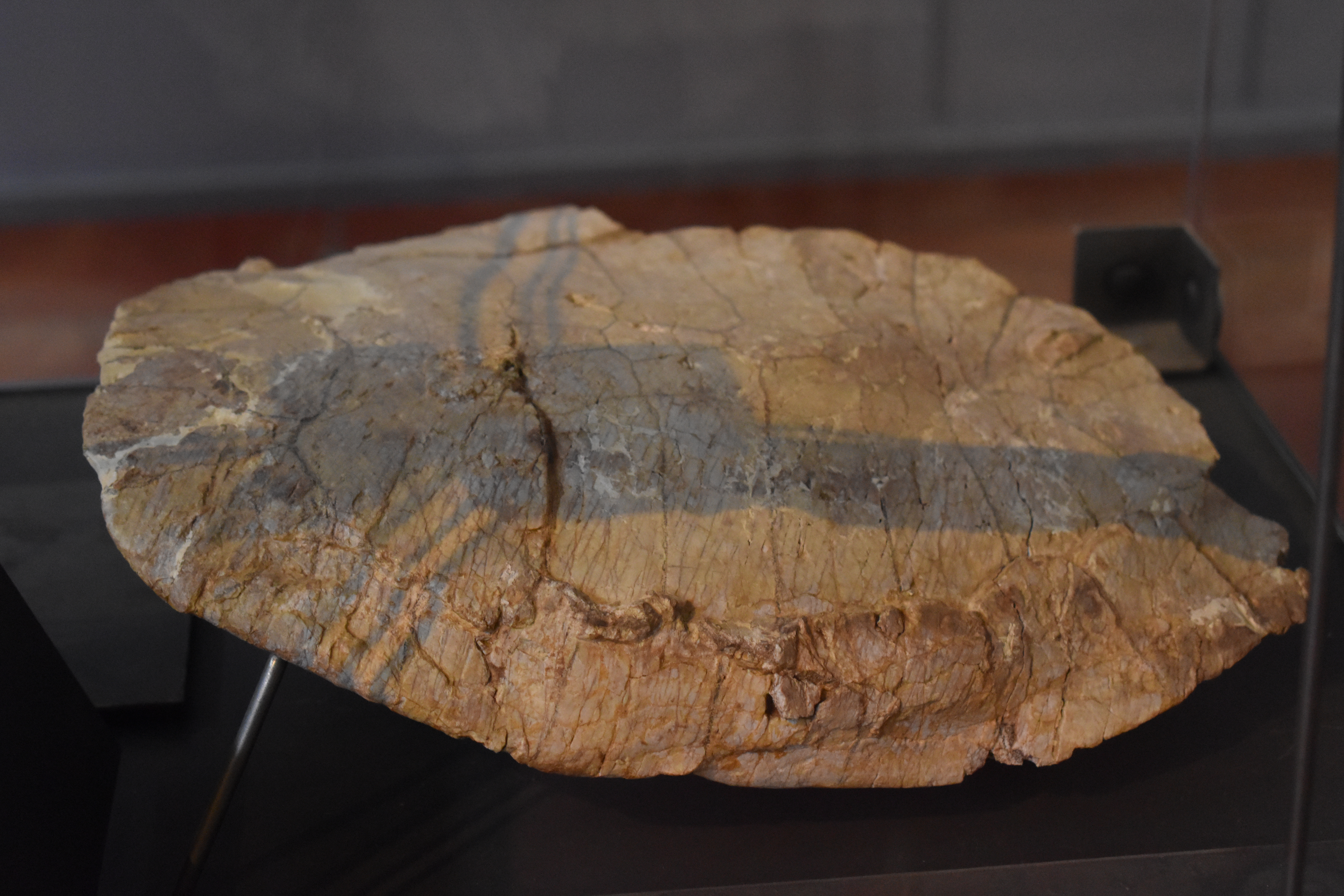
- Dinosauria - Elochelys

Scientific classification
- Domain: Eukaryota
- Kingdom: Animalia
- Phylum: Chordata
- Class: Reptilia
- Order: Testudines
- Suborder: Pleurodira
- Family: †Bothremydidae
- Subfamily: †Bothremydinae
- Tribe: †Bothremydini
- Subtribe: †Foxemydina
- Genus: †Elochelys; Nopcsa, 1931
- Species: †E. perfecta

Binomial name
- †Elochelys perfecta Nopcsa, 1931

= Elochelys =

Elochelys Temporal range: Campanian

Genus of reptiles

Elochelys ("swamp turtle") is an extinct genus of bothremydid pleurodiran turtle that was discovered in the Campanian (Late Cretaceous) of Fuveau Basin, France. The genus consists solely of type species E. perfecta, though a second species (E. covenarum) was reassigned to the genus Iberoccitanemys.

== Discovery ==
Elochelys was discovered in the Fuveau region of France, and is known from exclusively from a shell. The holotype was described by Baron Franz Nopcsa von Felső-Szilvás in 1931. A second species was described by Laurent, Yong and Claude, 2002. but was subsequently reassigned to a new genus, Iberoccitanemys.
