= Mauran =

- Commune
- Location of Mauran
- Location within France Location within Occitanie
- Coordinates: 43°11′22″N 1°01′56″E
- Country: France
- Region: Occitania
- Department: Haute-Garonne
- Arrondissement: Muret
- Canton: Cazères

Government
  - Mayor (2020–2026): Nicolas Rostaing
- Area^{1}: 5.09 km^{2} (1.97 sq mi)
- Elevation: 247 m (810 ft)
- Highest elevation: 520 m (1,710 ft)
- Lowest elevation: 236 m (774 ft)
- Population (2023): 201
  - Density: 39.5/km^{2} (102/sq mi)
- Time zone: UTC+01:00 (CET)
  - Summer (DST): UTC+02:00 (CEST)
- INSEE/Postal code: 31327 /31220
- ^{1} French Land Register data, which excludes lakes, ponds, glaciers > 1 km^{2} (0.386 sq mi or 247 acres) and river estuaries.

Mauran (French pronunciation: [moʁɑ̃]) is a commune in the Haute-Garonne department of southwestern France.

== Population ==
Historical population
Year	Pop.	±% p.a.
1968	124	—
1975	104	−2.48%
1982	117	+1.70%
1990	130	+1.33%
1999	119	−0.98%
2007	167	+4.33%
2012	181	+1.62%
2017	233	+5.18%
2023	201	−2.43%
Source: INSEE

== See also ==
- Communes of the Haute-Garonne department
