= Ausseing =

- Commune
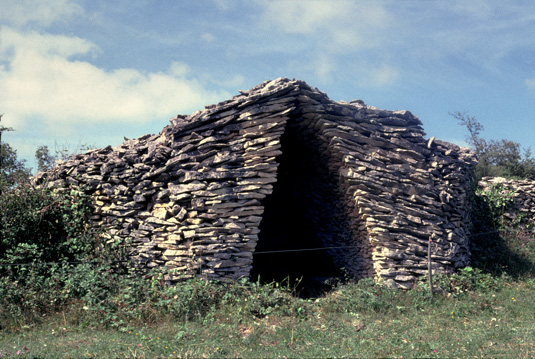
- A dry stone hut in Ausseing
- Location of Ausseing
- Location within France Location within Occitanie
- Coordinates: 43°09′11″N 1°01′07″E
- Country: France
- Region: Occitania
- Department: Haute-Garonne
- Arrondissement: Saint-Gaudens
- Canton: Bagnères-de-Luchon
- Intercommunality: CC Cagire Garonne Salat

Government
  - Mayor (2020–2026): Gilles Paris
- Area^{1}: 5.88 km^{2} (2.27 sq mi)
- Elevation: 459 m (1,506 ft)
- Highest elevation: 613 m (2,011 ft)
- Lowest elevation: 339 m (1,112 ft)
- Population (2023): 91
  - Density: 15/km^{2} (40/sq mi)
- Time zone: UTC+01:00 (CET)
  - Summer (DST): UTC+02:00 (CEST)
- INSEE/Postal code: 31030 /31260
- ^{1} French Land Register data, which excludes lakes, ponds, glaciers > 1 km^{2} (0.386 sq mi or 247 acres) and river estuaries.

Ausseing (French pronunciation: [osɛ̃]; Occitan: Aussen) is a commune in the Haute-Garonne department in southwestern France.

== Population ==
Historical population
| Year | Pop. | ±% p.a. |
|---|---|---|
| 1968 | 62 | — |
| 1975 | 57 | −1.19% |
| 1982 | 47 | −2.72% |
| 1990 | 55 | +1.98% |
| 1999 | 61 | +1.16% |
| 2007 | 66 | +0.99% |
| 2012 | 70 | +1.18% |
| 2017 | 72 | +0.57% |
| 2023 | 91 | +3.98% |
Source: INSEE

== See also ==
- Communes of the Haute-Garonne department
