= Plagne, Haute-Garonne =

Plagne
- Commune
- Location of Plagne
- Location within France Location within Occitanie
- Coordinates: 43°09′29″N 1°03′38″E
- Country: France
- Region: Occitania
- Department: Haute-Garonne
- Arrondissement: Muret
- Canton: Cazères

Government
  - Mayor (2020–2026): Henri Rouaix
- Area^{1}: 4.15 km^{2} (1.60 sq mi)
- Elevation: 360 m (1,180 ft)
- Highest elevation: 590 m (1,940 ft)
- Lowest elevation: 316 m (1,037 ft)
- Population (2023): 95
  - Density: 23/km^{2} (59/sq mi)
- Time zone: UTC+01:00 (CET)
  - Summer (DST): UTC+02:00 (CEST)
- INSEE/Postal code: 31422 /31220
- ^{1} French Land Register data, which excludes lakes, ponds, glaciers > 1 km^{2} (0.386 sq mi or 247 acres) and river estuaries.

Plagne (French pronunciation: [plaɲ]; Occitan: Planha) is a commune in the Haute-Garonne department in southwestern France.

== Population ==
Historical population
Year	Pop.	±% p.a.
1968	55	—
1975	70	+3.51%
1982	58	−2.65%
1990	60	+0.42%
1999	88	+4.35%
2007	96	+1.09%
2012	94	−0.42%
2017	97	+0.63%
2023	95	−0.35%
Source: INSEE

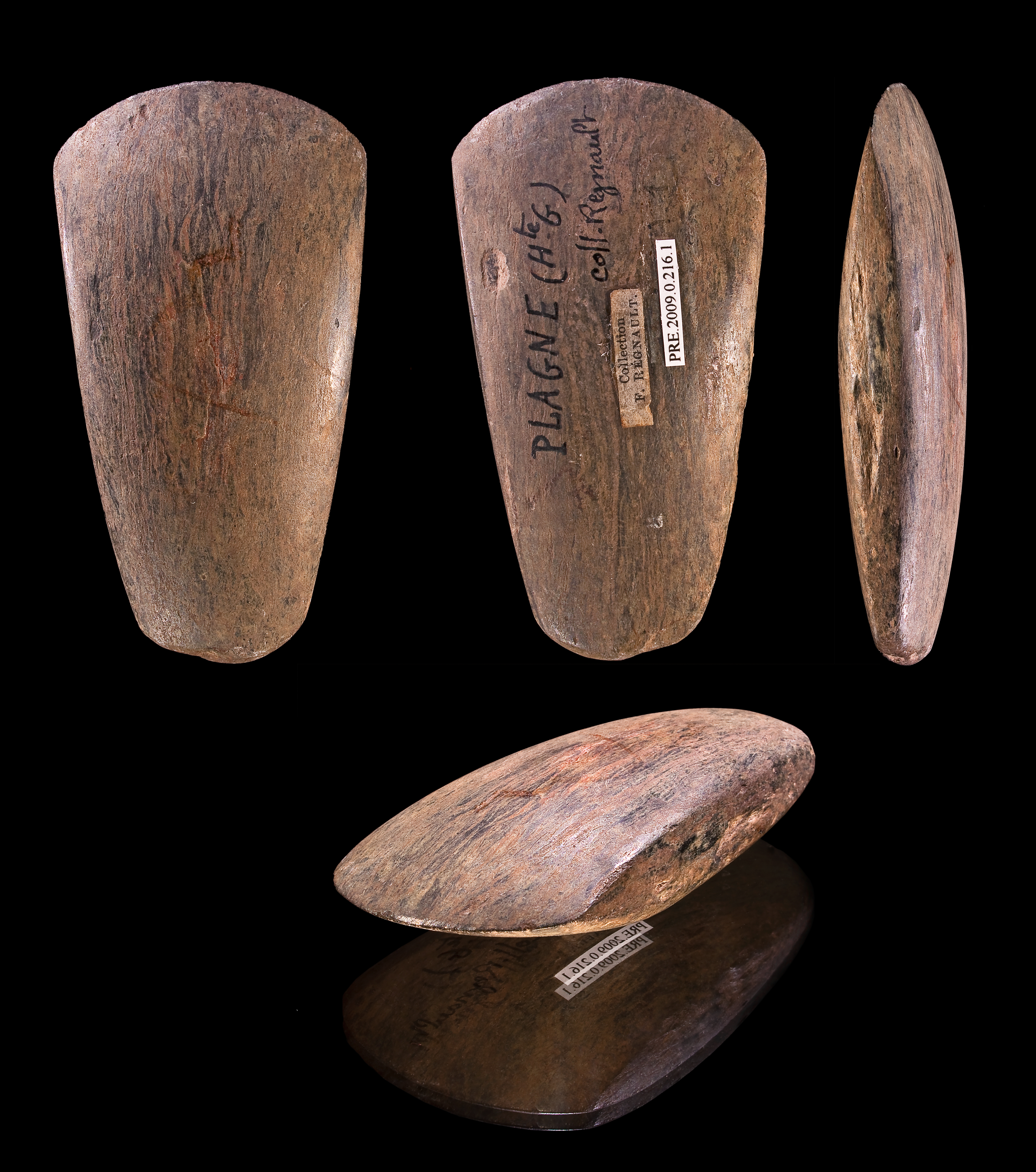
Polished Neolithic ax – Plagne, Museum of Toulouse

== See also ==
- Communes of the Haute-Garonne department
