= 2020 in reptile paleontology =

This list of fossil reptiles described in 2020 is a list of new taxa of fossil reptiles that were described during the year 2020, as well as other significant discoveries and events related to reptile paleontology that occurred in 2020.

== Lizards and snakes ==
=== New taxa ===
Name	Novelty	Status	Authors	Age	Type locality	Country	Notes	Images
Boipeba	Gen. et sp. nov		Fachini et al.	Late Cretaceous	Adamantina	Brazil	A snake belonging to the group Scolecophidia. The type species is B. tayasuensis.	
Borealoilysia	Gen. et sp. nov	Valid	Head	Middle Eocene	Bridger	United States (Wyoming)	An aniliid snake. Genus includes new species B. gunnelli. Announced in 2020; the final version of the article naming was published in 2021.	
Bothriagenys flectomendax	Sp. nov	In press	Wick & Shiller	Late Cretaceous (early Campanian)	Aguja	United States (Texas)	A member of Borioteiioidea of uncertain phylogenetic placement.	
Calumma benovskyi	Sp. nov		Čerňanský et al.	Early Miocene	Hiwegi	Kenya	A chameleon, a species of Calumma	Calumma benovskyi
Chalcides augei	Sp. nov	Valid	Čerňanský et al.	Early middle Miocene		Russia	A skink, a species of Chalcides. Announced in 2019; the final version of the article naming it was published in 2020.	
Eoconstrictor	Gen. et comb. nov	Valid	Scanferla & Smith	Eocene	Messel	Germany	A booid snake. The type species is "Palaeopython" fischeri Schaal (2004).	
Epileolis	Gen. et sp. nov	Valid	Alifanov	Late Paleocene		Mongolia	A lizard belonging to the family Agamidae. Genus includes new species E. reshetovi.	
Gavialimimus	Gen. et sp. nov	Valid	Strong et al.	Late Cretaceous		Morocco	A mosasaur belonging to the subfamily Plioplatecarpinae. Genus includes new species G. almaghribensis. Bardet et al. (2025) interpreted Platecarpus (?) ptychodon Arambourg (1952) as a probable senior synonym of G. almaghribensis, resulting in a new combination Gavialimimus ptychodon.	
Gnathomortis	Gen. et comb. nov	Valid	Lively	Late Cretaceous (middle Campanian)		United States (Colorado)	A mosasaur belonging to the family Mosasauridae; a new genus for "Prognathodon" stadtmani Kass (1999).	
Hydrargysaurus	Gen. et sp. nov	In press	Wick & Shiller	Late Cretaceous (early Campanian)	Aguja	United States (Texas)	A member or a relative of the group Borioteiioidea. Genus includes new species H. gladius.	
Hypostylos	Gen. et sp. nov	In press	Wick & Shiller	Late Cretaceous (early Campanian)	Aguja	United States (Texas)	A member of Scincomorpha belonging to the "paramacellodid"/cordylid grade. Genus includes new species H. lehmani.	
Kopidosaurus	Gen. et sp. nov		Scarpetta	Eocene	Willwood	United States (Wyoming)	A member of Pleurodonta of uncertain phylogenetic placement. The type species is K. perplexus.	
Messelopython	Gen. et sp. nov	Valid	Zaher & Smith	Eocene	Messel pit	Germany	A stem pythonid snake. Genus includes new species M. freyi.	
Neokotus	Gen. et sp. nov	Valid	Bittencourt et al.	Early Cretaceous (Valanginian)	Quiricó	Brazil	A lizard belonging to the family Paramacellodidae. The type species is N. sanfranciscanus.	
Vipera latastei ebusitana	Subsp. nov	Valid	Torres-Roig et al.	Pleistocene–Holocene		Spain	A viper, a subspecies of Vipera latastei.	

=== Research ===
- New fossil material of squamates is described from the Upper Cretaceous Fruitland and Kirtland formations (New Mexico, United States) by Woolley, Smith & Sertich (2020), expanding known taxonomic and morphological diversity of lizards within the "Hunter Wash Local Fauna".
- A study on the affinities of putative gekkotan eggshells from the Late Cretaceous of Europe is published by Choi et al. (2020), who interpret the fossil material of Pseudogeckoolithus as theropod eggshells.
- Fossils of tupinambine teiids are described from the late Eocene of the Quercy Phosphorites Formation (France) by Louis & Santiago (2020), representing the first record of this family from the Paleogene of Europe.
- A dentary of a cnemidophorine teiid is described from the Miocene of the Ogallala Group (Nebraska, United States) by Scarpetta (2020), who evaluates the implications of this specimen for the knowledge of the evolutionary history of cnemidophorines in North America during the Neogene.
- The first known fossil example of an iguana nesting burrow is reported from the Pleistocene Grotto Beach Formation (The Bahamas) by Martin et al. (2020).
- A study on the anatomy of the skull of Ophisaurus acuminatus, and on the taxonomic validity of this species, is published by Klembara & Čerňanský (2020).
- Fossil material of the monitor lizards is reported for the first time from the late Miocene localities in Armenia and Georgia by Vasilyan & Bukhsianidze (2020).
- A study on the evolutionary history of mosasauroids, comparing their evolutionary rates and traits to those of plesiosaurs and aiming to determine whether the rise and diversification of mosasauroids was influenced by competition with or disappearance of some plesiosaur taxa, is published by Madzia & Cau (2020).
- Grigoriev & Grabovskiy (2020) describe new fossil material of a tylosaurine from the Upper Cretaceous (Turonian) of the Chukotka Region (Russia), representing one of the oldest and northernmost mosasaur records reported so far, and evaluate the implications of this fossil material (as well as mosasaur fossils from the Santonian of the Komi Republic and from the Campanian–Maastrichtian of the Sakhalin Island) for the knowledge of the paleogeography and possible migrations of Arctic mosasaurs.
- A study on pathological features of a specimen of Prognathodon (belonging or related to the species P. sectorius) from the Maastrichtian Gulpen Formation (the Netherlands) is published by Bastiaans et al. (2020), who consider it most likely that this specimen was bitten in the snout by a large, possibly conspecific mosasaur, making it one of the few specimens with unambiguous evidence of agonistic interactions amongst mosasaurs.
- A study on the morphology of the snout of Taniwhasaurus antarcticus, indicating the presence of a complex internal neurovascular system of branched channels similar to systems present in extant aquatic vertebrates such as cetaceans and crocodiles, is published by Álvarez–Herrera, Agnolin & Novas (2020).
- Zietlow (2020) recovers growth series of Tylosaurus proriger and T. nepaeolicus, and tests the hypothesis that T. kansasensis represent juveniles of T. nepaeolicus.
- Redescription of Palaeophis oweni is published by Georgalis, Del Favero & Delfino (2020).
- Eocene snake vertebrae from Landana and Sassa-Zao (Angola), originally referred to Palaeophis aff. typhaeus, are assigned to the species Palaeophis africanus by Folie et al. (2020), who interpret these fossils as confirming the aquatic capabilities of palaeophiid snakes, and evaluate the implications of these fossils for the debate on the existence of primitive and advanced grades among palaeophiid snakes.
- New information on the anatomy of the Eocene fossil boas Messelophis variatus and Rieppelophis ermannorum, based on data from new specimens from the Messel pit (Germany), is presented by Scanferla & Smith (2020).
- Description of new fossil material of Thaumastophis missiaeni from the Eocene Cambay Shale (India) and a study on the phylogenetic relationships of this snake is published by Zaher et al. (2020), who name a new family Thaumastophiidae.

== Ichthyosauromorphs ==
=== New taxa ===
Name	Novelty	Status	Authors	Age	Type locality	Country	Notes	Images
Acuetzpalin	Gen. et sp. nov	Valid	Barrientos Lara, Alvarado Ortega, & Fernández	Late Jurassic	La Casita	Mexico	An ichthyosaur belonging to the family Ophthalmosauridae. The type species is A. carranzai.	
Cymbospondylus duelferi	Sp. nov	Valid	Klein et al.	Middle Triassic (Anisian)	Favret	United States (Nevada)		
Hauffiopteryx altera	Sp. nov	Valid	Maxwell & Cortés	Early Jurassic (Toarcian)	Posidonia Shale	Germany		
Nannopterygius borealis	Sp. nov	Valid	Zverkov & Jacobs	Early Cretaceous (Berriasian)		Norway; Russia		
Thalassodraco	Gen. et sp. nov	Valid	Jacobs & Martill	Late Jurassic (Tithonian)	Kimmeridge Clay	United Kingdom	An ichthyosaur belonging to the family Ophthalmosauridae. The type species is T. etchesi.	

=== Research ===
- Partial trunk region of the largest hupehsuchian reported so far is described from the Early Triassic of Hubei, China by Qiao, Iijima & Liu (2020), who interpret this specimen as evidence of early establishment of high predation pressure in the sea after the Permian–Triassic extinction event and before the Middle Triassic.
- New anatomical features of the holotype specimen of Cartorhynchus lenticarpus revealed by CT scanning, including unique dentition, are reported by Huang et al. (2020), who evaluate the implications of this species for the knowledge of the evolution of tooth morphology and diet in basal ichthyosauriforms.
- A caudal vertebra of a basal ichthyosauriform similar to grippidians, representing the youngest record of basal ichthyosauriforms to date, is described from the Middle Triassic (Ladinian) of Mallorca (Spain) by Matamales-Andreu et al. (2020).
- A study on the age of the fossils of Thaisaurus chonglakmanii is published by Tongtherm et al. (2020).
- A study on the tempo and mode of the morphological evolution of ichthyosaurs is published by Moon & Stubbs (2020).
- A study on skeletal pathologies in ichthyosaur specimens from the Middle Triassic Besano Formation and the Lower Jurassic Posidonia Shale, evaluating their implications for the knowledge of changing locomotory and behavioural constraints affecting different ichthyosaur taxa through time, is published by Pardo-Pérez, Kear & Maxwell (2020).
- Two new specimens of Mixosaurus cornalianus, preserving evidence of the presence of a dorsal fin and a well-developed, triangular dorsal lobe of the caudal fin in this species, are described from the Anisian Besano Formation (Italy) by Renesto et al. (2020).
- Jiang et al. (2020) report the discovery of remains of a thalattosaur belonging to the genus Xinpusaurus in the abdominal region of a specimen of Guizhouichthyosaurus from the Middle Triassic (Ladinian) Zhuganpo Member of the Falang Formation (China), and interpret this finding as likely the oldest evidence for predation on megafauna by marine tetrapods reported so far.
- A study on the anatomy of the holotype specimen of Temnodontosaurus crassimanus is published by Swaby & Lomax (2020), who consider T. crassimanus to be a valid species.
- Description of the most complete and best-preserved skeleton of Suevoleviathan integer is published by Maisch (2020).
- Partial skeleton of an ophthalmosaurid ichthyosaur, found with an ichthyosaur tooth (probably not belonging to the same specimen) stuck on its rib, is described from the Upper Jurassic Rosso Ammonitico Veronese Formation (Italy) by Serafini et al. (2020), possibly representing the first evidence of scavenging between two ichthyosaurs reported so far.
- A study on the anatomy and phylogenetic relationships of Maiaspondylus lindoei, "Ophthalmosaurus" cantabrigiensis and "Platypterygius" ochevi is published by Zverkov & Grigoriev (2020), who transfer "O". cantabrigiensis to the genus Maiaspondylus, and consider "P. ochevi to be a junior synonym of M. cantabrigiensis.
- Description of a new specimen of Muiscasaurus catheti from the Aptian Paja Formation (Colombia), providing new information on the anatomy of this taxon, and a study on the phylogenetic relationships of M. catheti is published by Páramo-Fonseca et al. (2020).

== Sauropterygians ==
=== New taxa ===
Name	Novelty	Status	Authors	Age	Type locality	Country	Notes	Images
Brevicaudosaurus	Gen. et sp. nov	Valid	Shang, Wu & Li	Middle Triassic (Ladinian)	Falang	China	A member of Nothosauroidea. The type species is B. jiyangshanensis.	
Jucha	Gen. et sp. nov	Valid	Fischer et al.	Early Cretaceous (Hauterivian)	Klimovka	Russia	An elasmosaurid plesiosaur. Genus includes new species J. squalea.	
Ophthalmothule	Gen. et sp. nov	Valid	Roberts et al.	Jurassic-Cretaceous boundary (latest Tithonian/early Berriasian)	Agardhfjellet	Norway	A cryptoclidid plesiosaur. The type species is O. cryostea.	
Wunyelfia	Gen. et sp. nov	Valid	Otero & Soto-Acuña	Late Cretaceous (Maastrichtian)	Quiriquina	Chile	An aristonectine elasmosaurid plesiosaur. Genus includes new species W. maulensis. Announced in 2020; the final version of the article naming was published in 2021.	

=== Research ===
- A study on the osteology and evolution of the temporal region of the skull of placodonts is published by Maisch et al. (2020).
- A study on the anatomy of the skull and braincase of Parahenodus atancensis, and on the anatomy of the reconstructed brain, inner ear and neurosensory structures of this taxon, is published by De Miguel Chaves et al. (2020).
- New fossil material of Lariosaurus sanxiaensis is described from the Lower Triassic Jialingjiang Formation (China) by Li & Liu (2020), who also study the phylogenetic relationships of this taxon, as well as the predator-prey relationship in the associated fauna and their implications for the knowledge of the biotic recovery after the Permian–Triassic extinction event.
- New fossil material of cryptoclidid plesiosaurs, including the first occurrence of Vinialesaurus in the Southern Hemisphere, is described from the Jurassic of the Atacama Desert by Otero et al. (2020).
- Redescription of the holotype specimen of Aphrosaurus furlongi and a study on the evolution and phylogenetic relationships of elasmosaurid plesiosaurs is published by O'Gorman (2020), who names a new clade Euelasmosaurida.
- The first non-aristonectine elasmosaurid skeleton from Antarctica that preserves an associated lower jaw is described by O'Gorman et al. (2020).
- An isolated cervical centrum of a brachauchenine pliosaurid is described from the Cenomanian of Russia by Zverkov & Pervushov (2020), who interpret this fossil as belonging to one of the largest known pliosaurids, and consider it to be evidence of survival gigantic pliosaurids into the Cenomanian.
- A study on the evolution of the short-necked plesiosaurs throughout the Jurassic and Cretaceous periods is published by Fischer et al. (2020).

== Turtles ==
=== New taxa ===
Name	Novelty	Status	Authors	Age	Type locality	Country	Notes	Images
Akoranemys	Gen. et sp. nov	In press	Pérez-García	Late Cretaceous (Cenomanian)		Madagascar	A bothremydid pleurodiran. Genus includes new species A. madagasika.	
Alatochelon	Gen. et sp. nov	Valid	Pérez-García, Vlachos & Murelaga	Early Pliocene	Cigarrón	Spain	A large tortoise. Genus includes new species A. myrteum.	
Allaeochelys liliae	Sp. nov	In press	Carbot-Chanona et al.	Miocene (Aquitanian)	Mazantic Shale	Mexico		
Amabilis	Gen. et sp. nov	Valid	Hermanson et al.	Late Cretaceous	Bauru	Brazil	A podocnemidoid pleurodiran. Genus includes new species A. uchoensis.	
Aragochersis	Gen. et sp. nov	Valid	Pérez García et al.	Early Cretaceous (Albian)	Escucha	Spain	A member of the family Helochelydridae. Genus includes new species A. lignitesta.	
Axestemys erquelinnensis	Sp. nov	Valid	Pérez-García & Smith	Eocene (Ypresian)		Belgium	Announced in 2020; the final version of the article naming was published in 2021.	
Chelonoidis alburyorum keegani	Subsp. nov	Valid	Franz, Albury & Steadman	Late Holocene		Turks and Caicos Islands	A tortoise.	
Chelonoidis alburyorum sementis	Subsp. nov	Valid	Franz, Albury & Steadman	Late Holocene		Turks and Caicos Islands	A tortoise.	
Chersine khosatzkyi	Sp. nov	Valid	Redkozubov et al.	Early Pliocene		Moldova	A tortoise. Announced in 2020; the final version of the article naming it was published in 2021.	
Gallica	Gen. et sp. nov	Valid	Pérez-García	Late Paleocene		France	A "macrobaenid" eucryptodiran. Genus includes new species G. lapparentiana.	
Itapecuruemys	Gen. et sp. nov	In press	Batista, Carvalho & de la Fuente	Early Cretaceous	Itapecuru	Brazil	A pleurodiran turtle belonging to the group Pelomedusoides. Genus includes new species I. amazonensis.	
Jainemys	Gen. et comb. nov	Valid	Joyce & Bandyopadhyay	Late Cretaceous (Maastrichtian)	Lameta	India	A member of the family Bothremydidae belonging to the tribe Kurmademydini; a new genus for "Carteremys" pisdurensis Jain (1977).	
Lakotemys	Gen. et sp. nov	Valid	Joyce, Rollot & Murelaga	Early Cretaceous (Berriasian–Valanginian)	Lakota	United States (South Dakota)	A member of the family Baenidae. The type species is L. australodakotensis.	
Laurasichersis	Gen. et sp. nov		Pérez García	Paleocene (Thanetian)	Sables de Bracheux	France	A member of the family Sichuanchelyidae. The type species is L. relicta.	
Melanochelys tapani	Nom. nov	Valid	Garbin, Bandyopadhyay & Joyce	Miocene/Pliocene	Siwalik Hills	India	A species of Melanochelys; a replacement name for Nicoria tricarinata var. sivalensis Lydekker (1889).	
Mesoclemmys vanegasorum	Sp. nov	Valid	Cadena et al.	Laventan	La Victoria	Colombia	A species of Mesoclemmys	
Palaeomauremys metallicus	Sp. nov	Valid	Karl	Oligocene		Germany	A member of the family Geoemydidae.	
Palauchelys	Gen. et sp. nov	In press	López-Conde et al.	Late Cretaceous (Campanian)	Olmos	Mexico	A bothremydid pleurodiran. Genus includes new species P. montellanoi.	
Prochelidella buitreraensis	Sp. nov	Valid	Maniel et al.	Late Cretaceous (Cenomanian)	Candeleros	Argentina		
Ragechelus	Gen. et sp. nov	Valid	Lapparent de Broin, Chirio & Bour	Late Cretaceous (Maastrichtian)	Farin-Doutchi	Niger	A member of the family Podocnemididae belonging to the subfamily Erymnochelyinae. The type species is R. sahelica.	
Solnhofia brachyrhyncha	Sp. nov	Valid	Anquetin & Püntener	Late Jurassic (Kimmeridgian)	Reuchenette	Switzerland	A member of Thalassochelydia.	
Testudo hellenica	Sp. nov	Valid	Garcia et al.	Miocene (Vallesian)		Greece	A species of Testudo.	
Titanochelon kayadibiensis	Sp. nov	Valid	Karl, Staesche & Safi	Miocene (Turolian -Tortonian)		Turkey	A species of Titanochelon	
Waluchelys	Gen. et sp. nov	Valid	Sterli et al.	Late Triassic	Quebrada del Barro	Argentina	A member of the family Australochelyidae. Genus includes new species W. cavitesta.	
Yaminuechelys sulcipeculiaris	Sp. nov	Valid	Oriozabala, Sterli & De La Fuente	Late Cretaceous (Campanian–Maastrichtian)	La Colonia	Argentina	A member of the family Chelidae	

=== Research ===
- A study on the evolution of turtle skull architecture, aiming to assess the functional significance of changes in their skull architecture during feeding on the basis of data from extant and fossil taxa, is published by Ferreira et al. (2020).
- A study on the relation between ecology and shell shape in extant turtles, and its implications for the knowledge of the ecology of fossil turtles, is published by Dziomber, Joyce & Foth (2020).
- A study on the early evolution of turtles during the Triassic period is published by de la Fuente, Sterli & Krapovickas (2020).
- A study on non-marine turtle distribution and diversity from the Late Triassic to the Paleogene is published by Cleary et al. (2020).
- Szczygielski (2020) revises the first described Triassic turtle Chelytherium obscurum, and considers it to be synonymous with Proterochersis robusta.
- Description of new fossil material of Indochelys spatulata from the Jurassic Kota Formation (India), and a study on the anatomy and phylogenetic relationships of this taxon, is published by Joyce & Bandyopadhyay (2020).
- The first three-dimensional reconstruction of the skull of Kallokibotion bajazidi is presented by Martín-Jiménez, Codrea & Pérez-García (2020).
- Fossil material of an indeterminate member of Pelomedusoides is described from the Valanginian Rosablanca Formation (Colombia) by Cadena (2020), who interprets this finding as additional evidence supporting the occurrence of Pelomedusoides during the Valanginian in northern South America.
- New specimens of Araripemys barretoi, providing new information on the morphological variation within this species, are described from the Crato Formation and Romualdo Formation (Brazil) by Limaverde et al. (2020).
- A study on the histology of the shell of Cearachelys placidoi is published by Sena et al. (2020).
- New fossil material of Cordichelys is described from the Eocene Birket Qarun Formation and Qasr el Sagha Formation (Egypt) by Cherney et al. (2020), who evaluate the implications of these fossils for the knowledge of the morphological variation within the genus Cordichelys, its ecology and the relationship between Cordichelys and Stereogenys.
- Cadena et al. (2020) describe new fossil material of Stupendemys geographicus from the Miocene of Venezuela and Colombia, providing new information on the anatomy and paleobiology of this species.
- Peltochelys duchastelii is reinterpreted as a member of Paracryptodira by Joyce & Rollot (2020).
- Description of the anatomy of the skull of Pleurosternon bullockii is published by Evers, Rollot & Joyce (2020).
- Redescription of the anatomy of the skull and mandible of Sandownia harrisi is published by Evers & Joyce (2020).
- New information on the anatomy and stratigraphic and geographic distribution of Anosteira pulchra is presented by Adrian et al. (2020).
- A revision of the extinct geoemydid Echmatemys from North America, based mainly on data from a slab containing several turtle shells collected from the Bridgerian of Levett Creek (Wyoming, United States), is published by Vlachos (2020).
- A study on the phylogenetic relationships of a putative testudinoid Cardichelyon rogerwoodi is published by Joyce & Claude (2020), who consider it more likely that this taxon is a member of Kinosternoidea.
- Fossil remains of dermochelyid turtles representing the first confidently identified multispecies assemblage of dermochelyids are described from the Oligocene Chandler Bridge and Ashley formations (South Carolina, United States) by Fallon & Boessenecker (2020).

== Archosauriformes ==
=== Other archosauriforms ===
==== New taxa ====
Name	Novelty	Status	Authors	Age	Type locality	Country	Notes	Images
Polymorphodon	Gen. et sp. nov	Valid	Sues et al.	Middle Triassic (Ladinian)	Erfurt	Germany	A non-archosaurian member of Archosauriformes. Genus includes new species P. adorfi.	
Rugarhynchos	Gen. et comb. nov	Valid	Wynd et al.	Late Triassic	Chinle	United States (New Mexico)	A member of the family Doswelliidae; a new genus for "Doswellia" sixmilensis Heckert, Lucas & Spielmann (2012).	

==== Research ====
- New Early Triassic archosauriform track assemblage is described from the Gardetta Plateau (Western Alps, Italy) by Petti et al. (2020), who interpret this finding as evidence of the presence of archosauriforms at low latitudes soon after the Permian–Triassic extinction event, and name a new ichnotaxon Isochirotherium gardettensis.
- Postcranial material of an erythrosuchid from the Rassypnaya locality (Olenekian; Orenburg Oblast, Russia), previously referred to Vjushkovia triplicostata, is referred to the species Garjainia prima by Maidment et al. (2020), who evalue the implications of this fossil material for the knowledge of the phylogenetic relationships, body mass and locomotor musculature of erythrosuchids.
- Redescription of the anatomy of the holotype specimen of Chanaresuchus bonapartei and a study on the phylogenetic relationships of this species is published by Trotteyn & Ezcurra (2020).
- Redescription of the anatomy of the skull and mandible of Euparkeria capensis is published Sookias et al. (2020).
- A study on the joint mobility of the hindlimb of Euparkeria capensis, and on its implications for the knowledge of the evolution of the locomotor capabilities of archosaurs, is published by Demuth, Rayfield & Hutchinson (2020).
- Phytosaur remains are described from the Upper Triassic Upper Karoo Group (Zimbabwe) by Barrett et al. (2020), representing the first record of members of this group from sub-Saharan Africa.
- An assemblage of at least 21 phytosaur specimens dominated by juveniles and subadults is described from the Upper Triassic Tiki Formation (India) by Datta, Mukherjee & Ray (2020), who interpret this finding as likely evidence of parental care in phytosaurs, and study the taphonomy of the assemblage.
- A study on the evolution of the skull shape in phytosaurs is published by Datta, Sharma & Ray (2020).
- A study comparing teeth microwear textures in Machaeroprosopus pristinus, Mystriosuchus planirostris, Nicrosaurus kapffi, N. meyeri and "Smilosuchus" lithodendrorum, aiming to determine whether microwear texture differences reflect dietary differences between phytosaur species, is published by Bestwick et al. (2020).

== Other reptiles ==
=== New taxa ===
Name	Novelty	Status	Authors	Age	Type locality	Country	Notes	Images
Carbonodraco	Gen. et sp. nov	Valid	Mann et al.	Carboniferous (Moscovian)	Allegheny	United States	A member of the family Acleistorhinidae. The type species is C. lundi. Announced in 2019; the correction including the required ZooBank accession number was published in 2020.	
Elessaurus	Gen. et sp. nov	Valid	De-Oliveira et al.	Early Triassic	Sanga do Cabral	Brazil	An archosauromorph reptile of uncertain phylogenetic placement, possibly a relative of tanystropheids. The type species is E. gondwanoccidens.	
Eomurruna	Gen. et sp. nov	Valid	Hamley, Cisneros & Damiani	Early Triassic	Arcadia	Australia	A procolophonid. Genus includes new species E. yurrgensis.	
Feralisaurus	Gen. et sp. nov	Valid	Cavicchini, Zaher & Benton	Middle Triassic (Anisian)	Helsby Sandstone	United Kingdom	A neodiapsid reptile of uncertain phylogenetic placement, possibly a member of Lepidosauromorpha. The type species is F. corami.	
Gunakadeit	Gen. et sp. nov	Valid	Druckenmiller et al.	Late Triassic (Norian)	Hound Island	United States (Alaska)	A thalattosaur. The type species is G. joseeae.	
Heishanosaurus	Gen. et sp. nov	Valid	Dong et al.	Early Cretaceous (Aptian–Albian)	Shahai	China	A member of Choristodera. The type species is H. pygmaeus.	
Lanceirosphenodon	Gen. et sp. nov	Valid	Vivar et al.	Late Triassic (Norian)	Candelária	Brazil	A rhynchocephalian. Genus includes new species L. ferigoloi.	
Micromenodon	Gen. et sp. nov	Valid	Sues & Schoch	Late Triassic (Carnian)	Doswell	United States (Virginia)	A rhynchocephalian. Genus includes new species M. pitti.	
Oculudentavis	Gen. et sp. nov	Disputed	Xing et al.	Late Cretaceous (Cenomanian)	Burmese amber	Myanmar	A diapsid of uncertain phylogenetic placement. Originally described as a member of Avialae but subsequently argued to be a lizard. Genus includes new species O. khaungraae. Its status as a validly named taxon is controversial because the scientific article it was named in was subsequently retracted.	
Oryctorhynchus	Gen. et sp. nov	Valid	Sues, Fitch & Whatley	Late Triassic (Carnian? - Norian?)	Wolfville	Canada (Nova Scotia)	A rhynchosaur. Genus includes new species O. bairdi.	
Raibliania	Gen. et sp. nov	Valid	Dalla Vecchia	Late Triassic (Carnian)	Calcare del Predil	Italy	A member of the family Tanystropheidae. The type species is R. calligarisi.	
Skybalonyx	Gen. et sp. nov	Valid	Jenkins et al.	Late Triassic	Chinle	United States (Arizona)	A member of the family Drepanosauridae. Genus includes new species S. skapter.	
Smilodonterpeton	Gen. et sp. nov	In press	Skinner, Whiteside & Benton	Late Triassic (Rhaetian)		United Kingdom	A procolophonid. Genus includes new species S. ruthinensis.	
Tanystropheus hydroides	Sp. nov	Valid	Spiekman et al.	Late Triassic	Besano	Italy-Switzerland border		
Trilophosaurus phasmalophos	Sp. nov	Valid	Kligman et al.	Late Triassic (Norian)	Chinle	United States (Arizona)		
Vellbergia	Gen. et sp. nov		Sobral, Simões & Schoch	Middle Triassic (Ladinian)	Erfurt	Germany	A non-lepidosaurian lepidosauromorph. The type species is V. bartholomaei.	
Youngetta	Gen. et comb. nov	Valid	Hamley, Cisneros & Damiani	Early Triassic		China	A procolophonid; a new genus for "Eumetabolodon" dongshengensis Li (1983).	

=== Research ===
- A study on fracture planes (unossified regions in the middle of vertebral centra) in tail vertebrae of mesosaurs is published by MacDougall et al. (2020), who argue that mesosaurs were theoretically capable of tail autotomy, but probably did not utilize this ability.
- A study on patterns of tooth development and replacement in Belebey and Bolosaurus, indicating that bolosaurid teeth had thecodont implantation with deep roots, is published by Snyder et al. (2020).
- Revision of Pachypes-like footprints from the Cisuralian–Guadalupian of Europe and North America is published by Marchetti et al. (2020), who date the earliest known occurrence of Pachypes to the Artinskian, interpret the footprints belonging to the ichnospecies Pachypes ollieri as produced by nycteroleter pareiasauromorphs, and argue that the earliest occurrences of pareiasauromorph footprints precede the earliest occurrence of this group in the skeletal record by at least 10 million years.
- A study on the dental wear along the tooth rows of nearly one hundred jaws of Captorhinus aguti, indicating that this reptile preferred to feed using the right side of the jaw, is published by Reisz et al. (2020).
- Redescription of Cargninia enigmatica is published by Vivar et al. (2020).
- A study on the phylogenetic relationships and evolutionary history of sphenodontian reptiles is published by Simões, Caldwell & Pierce (2020).
- A study on the feeding mechanics and ecology of Clevosaurus hudsoni and C. cambrica, as indicated by their bite force, resistance of skull bones to bending and torsion, and the distribution of stresses in the jaws during biting, is published by Chambi-Trowell et al. (2020).
- A study on the anatomy and phylogenetic relationships of Colobops noviportensis is published by Scheyer et al. (2020), who reinterpret this taxon as a probable rhynchocephalian.
- A study on the morphology of teeth of Priosphenodon avelasi is published by LeBlanc et al. (2020).
- Partial skeleton of a small reptile, probably a juvenile specimen of Eusaurosphargis dalsassoi, is described from the Anisian Buchenstein Formation (northern Dolomites, Italy) by Renesto, Kustatscher & Gianolla (2020), who interpret this finding as possible evidence of that the lands emerged near the basins of the northern Dolomites, Besano Formation and Prosanto Formation had a similar reptilian fauna during the middle-late Anisian.
- Fossil tracks possibly produced by a monjurosuchid-like choristoderan are described from the Albian Daegu Formation (South Korea) by Lee, Kong & Jung (2020), who attempt to determine the trackmaker's locomotory posture on land, and name a new ichnotaxon Novapes ulsanensis.
- A study on the anatomy of the skull of Champsosaurus lindoei is published by Dudgeon et al. (2020), who evaluate the morphology of a putative neomorphic bone in the skull and its possible developmental and functional origins.
- A study on the internal anatomy of the skull of Champsosaurus lindoei and C. natator, and on their probable sensory abilities, is published by Dudgeon et al. (2020).
- A study on the Triassic fossil record and evolution of non-archosaurian archosauromorph reptiles in South America is published by Ezcurra et al. (2020), who also identify the first record of the family Proterosuchidae from South America (partial braincase from the Buena Vista Formation, Uruguay).
- New fossil material of tanystropheid and azendohsaurid archosauromorphs, providing new information on the diversity of Late Triassic archosauromorph reptiles in North America, is described from the Lamy Quarry south of the town of Lamy (Garita Creek Formation; New Mexico, United States) by Hégron et al. (2020).
- Redescription of the anatomy of the skeleton of Macrocnemus fuyuanensis is published by Scheyer et al. (2020).
- Description of the morphology of the skull of Macrocnemus bassanii is published by Miedema et al. (2020).
- A study on the morphology of the skull of Tanystropheus hydroides is published by Spiekman et al. (2020).
- A study on bone histology of three archosauromorph reptiles (Lagerpeton chanarensis, Tropidosuchus romeri and Chanaresuchus bonapartei) from the Triassic Chañares Formation (Argentina), evaluating its implications for the knowledge of the paleobiology of these taxa, is published by Marsà, Agnolín & Novas (2020).

== Reptiles in general ==
- A study on the dynamics of phenotypic and molecular evolution of reptiles during the early diversification of the major lineages of diapsid reptiles in the Permian and Triassic periods, and during the evolution of lepidosaurs from the Jurassic to the present, is published by Simões et al. (2020).
- A large, soft-shelled egg, most closely resembling eggs of extant lizards and snakes and possibly produced by a mosasaur, is described from the Upper Cretaceous López de Bertodano Formation (Antarctica) by Legendre et al. (2020), who name a new ootaxon Antarcticoolithus bradyi.
- A study on the ecological diversity of Mesozoic marine tetrapods is published by Reeves et al. (2020).
- Diverse marine reptile faunas, including taxa previously known nearly exclusively from coeval strata of Europe (such as Temnodontosaurus, Stenopterygius, microcleidids, rhomaleosaurids and basal pliosaurids), are described from the Lower Jurassic Series (Pliensbachian and Toarcian stages) of Eastern Siberia (Russia) by Zverkov, Grigoriev & Danilov (2020).
- A study on the evolution of the archosauromorph ankle, aiming to test the hypothesis of fusion between the centrale and astragalus and the alternative hypothesis of a complete loss of the centrale, based on embryological and palaeontological data, is published by Blanco, Ezcurra & Bona (2020).
