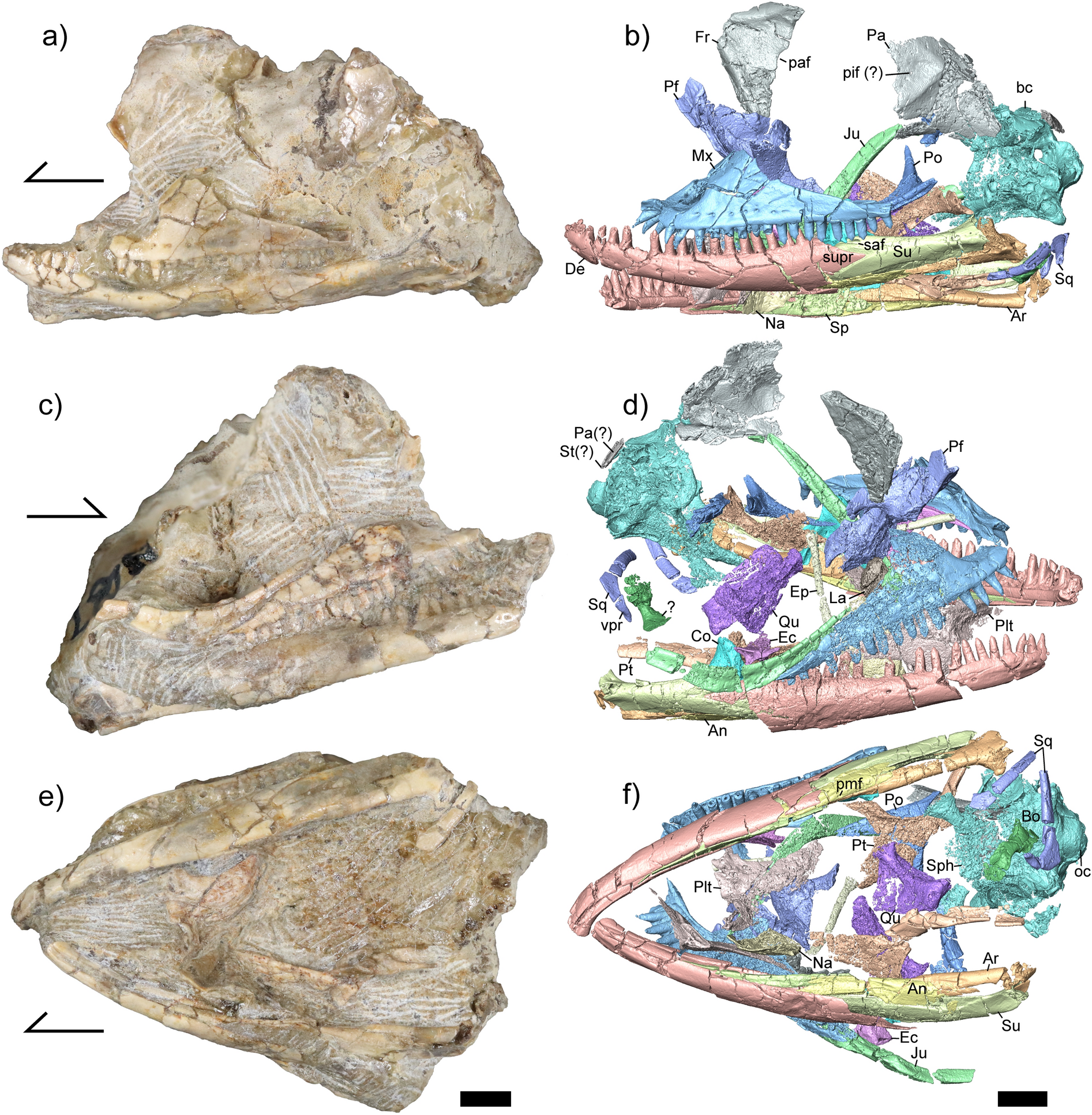
- Photographs (left) and digital renderings using CT scans (right) of the holotype skull

Scientific classification
- Kingdom: Animalia
- Phylum: Chordata
- Class: Reptilia
- Order: Squamata
- Suborder: Iguania
- Infraorder: Pleurodonta
- Genus: †Kopidosaurus; Scarpetta, 2020
- Species: †K. perplexus

Binomial name
- †Kopidosaurus perplexus Scarpetta, 2020

= Kopidosaurus =

Kopidosaurus Temporal range: Early Eocene, ~52.59 Ma

Extinct lizard genus

Kopidosaurus (lit. 'kopis lizard') is an extinct genus of iguanian lizard known from the early Eocene Willwood Formation of Wyoming, United States. The genus contains a single species, Kopidosaurus perplexus, known from a partial skull. The exact relationships of this species within Iguania are uncertain and variable, depending on the analysis and constraints used, but a placement within the more exclusive group Pleurodonta is well-supported.

== Discovery and naming ==
The Kopidosaurus fossil material was discovered by an expedition to Bighorn Basin by Yale University in 1971. This specimen was collected from the YPM (Yale Peabody Museum) 24 locality in Park County, Wyoming, United States, representing outcrops of the upper Willwood Formation, assigned to the Wasatchian North American land mammal age (NALMA). The specimen is now housed at the Peabody Museum of Natural History, where it is permanently accessioned as specimen YPM VP 8287. The specimen consists of most of an isolated skull, excluding the premaxillae and vomers, and possibly the postfrontals and septomaxillae. Parts of it remain in anatomical articulation, such as the mandible and braincase, while others are displaced to some degree.

In 2017, Simon G. Scarpetta noted this specimen in the collections of the Peabody Museum of Natural History, the existence of which had gone unnoticed since its discovery. High-resolution CT scans of the skull were subsequently obtained at the University of Texas at Austin to allow for improved observations of its internal anatomy. In September 2020, Scarpetta described Kopidosaurus perplexus as a new genus and species of extinct lizard based on these fossil remains, establishing YPM VP 8287 as the holotype specimen. The generic name, Kopidosaurus, combines kopis, an Ancient Greek curve-bladed knife, with the Greek word σαῦρος (sauros), meaning 'lizard'. This name was chosen in reference to the sharp, recurved teeth of the upper jaw. The specific name, perplexus, alludes to the taxon's unclear phylogenetic relationships.

== Description and classification ==
Kopidosaurus can be identified as a member of the squamate clade Iguania based on the presence of a prefrontal boss (otherwise only seen in the Teiinae) and a parietal foramen that is partially bounded by the frontal bone. It can further be placed within the smaller iguanian clade Pleurodonta—the other clade being Acrodonta—based on a distinct arrangement of foramina at the front of the maxilla. It can be distinguished from other pleurodontans as it lacks a process on the squamosal facing up and backward, otherwise only seen in members of the Temujiniidae, though Kopidosaurus can be differentiated from temujiniids by a combination of other features. There are no characteristics of the holotype that allow a confident referral to any modern pleurodontan clade.

The left maxilla, which is more complete than the right maxilla, has positions for 17 teeth, and bears eight nutrient foramina. The right dentary has 20 tooth positions and five nutrient foramina. Palatal dentition is restricted to two teeth on the pterygoid. The teeth are heterodont (tooth crowns not all the same), with pleurodont implantation.
