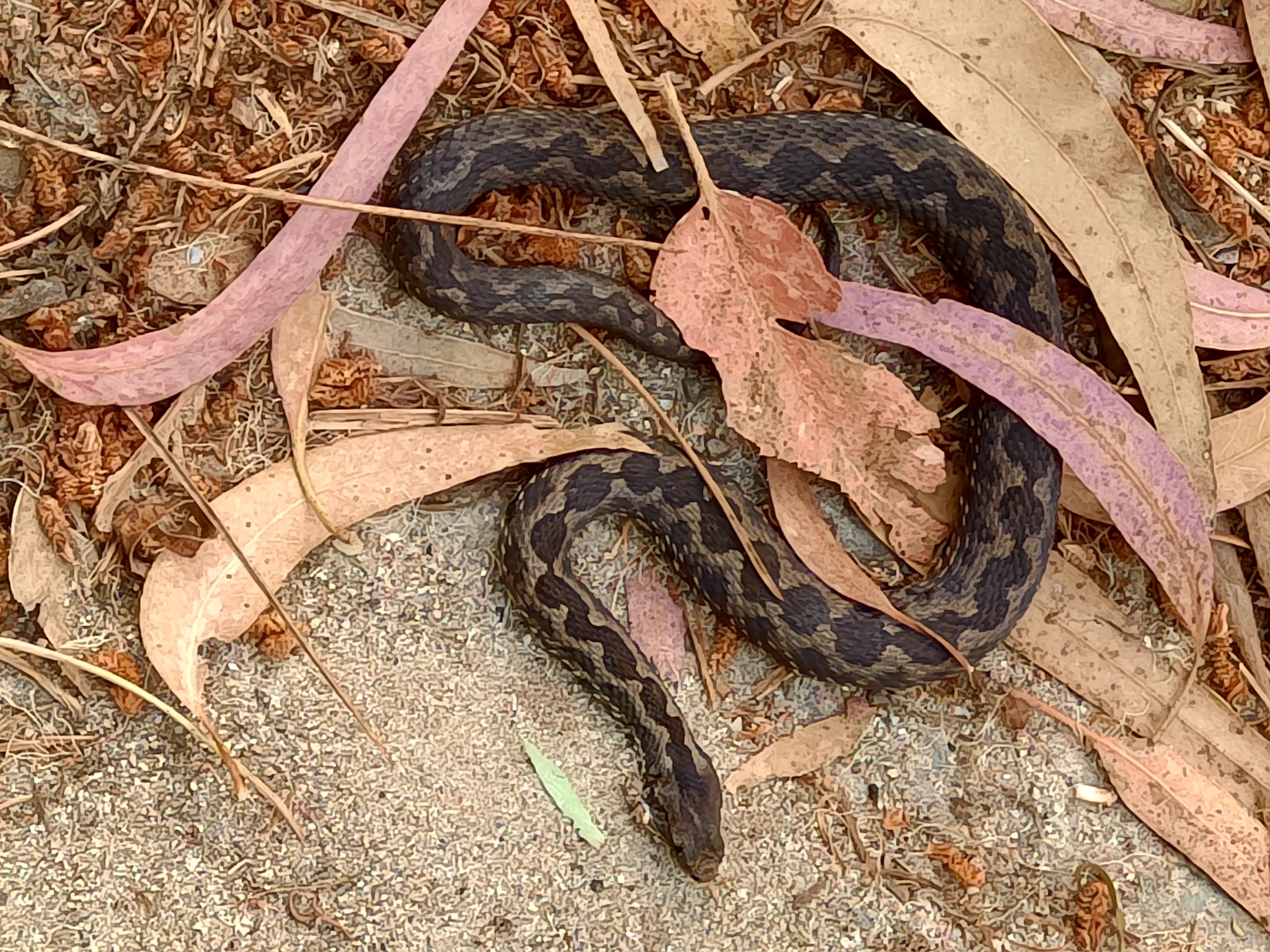

Scientific classification
- Domain: Eukaryota
- Kingdom: Animalia
- Phylum: Chordata
- Class: Reptilia
- Order: Squamata
- Suborder: Serpentes
- Family: Viperidae
- Genus: Vipera
- Species: V. latastei
- Subspecies: V. l. gaditana

Trinomial name
- Vipera latastei gaditana Saint-Girons, 1977

= Vipera latastei gaditana =

Subspecies of snake

Vipera latastei gaditana is a viper subspecies endemic to southern Spain and Portugal, as well as North Africa. Like all other vipers, it is venomous.

== Description ==
Holotype: MG 1352.99.

== Geographic range ==
According to Saint-Girons (1977), it is found in southern Spain and Portugal, as well as North Africa. McDiarmid et al. (1999) describe the north African part of the range as being the Mediterranean region of Morocco, Algeria and Tunisia.

The type locality is given as "Coto Doñana, Huelva, Espagne".
