= Carteremys =

Carteremys Temporal range: Maastrichtian–Eocene

Scientific classification
- Kingdom: Animalia
- Phylum: Chordata
- Class: Reptilia
- Order: Testudines
- Suborder: Pleurodira
- Family: Pelomedusidae
- Genus: †Carteremys; Williams, 1953
- Species: †C. leithi

Binomial name
- †Carteremys leithi Williams, 1953

Synonyms
- Hydraspis leithii Carter, 1852; Testudo leithii Carter, 1871; Testudo kleinmanni Lortet, 1883

Extinct genus of turtle

Carteremys is an extinct genus of pelomedusid pleurodiran turtle from the Maastrichtian (Late Cretaceous)-Eocene, of India based on the type species C. leithi, which was named in 1953 by E. Williams and was originally placed in the genera Hydraspis by H. J. Carter in 1852 and Testudo, also by H. J. Carter, in 1871. A second species, C. pisdurensis, was named in 1977 by Sohan Lal Jain, but it was transferred to the separate genus Jainemys in 2020 by Joyce and Bandyopadhyay.
