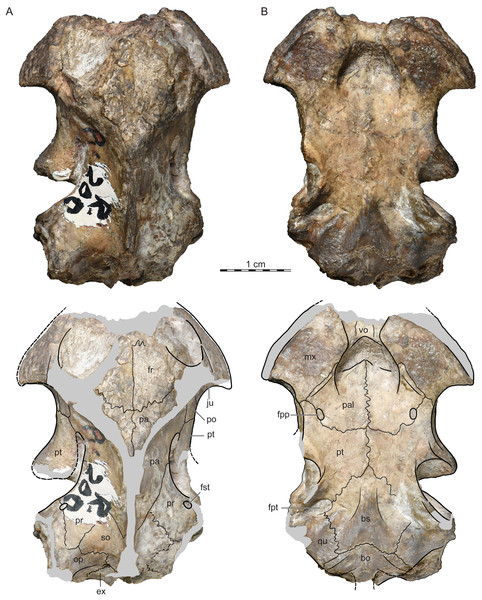
- Holotype eroded cranium of Jainemys

Scientific classification
- Kingdom: Animalia
- Phylum: Chordata
- Class: Reptilia
- Order: Testudines
- Suborder: Pleurodira
- Family: †Bothremydidae
- Subfamily: †Kurmademydinae
- Tribe: †Kurmademydini
- Genus: †Jainemys; Joyce & Bandyopadhyay, 2020
- Species: †J. pisdurensis

Binomial name
- †Jainemys pisdurensis Joyce & Bandyopadhyay, 2020

Synonyms
- Carteremys pisdurensis Jain, 1977

= Jainemys =

Jainemys Temporal range: Late Cretaceous, 70.6–66 Ma

Genus of reptiles

Jainemys (meaning "Jain's Turtle") is an extinct genus of bothremydid pleurodiran turtle that has been found in the Lameta Formation, India. Originally described by Sohan Lal Jain in 1977 under the name "Carteremys" pisdurensis on the basis of having a deep upper temporal emargination. In 1985, it was assigned to the genus Shweboemys. The species was transferred to the new genus Jainemys by Joyce & Bandyopadhyay in 2020.

The holotype of Jainemys is a partial cranium, and the only element assigned to "Carteremys" that is not to be reassigned to another genus.
