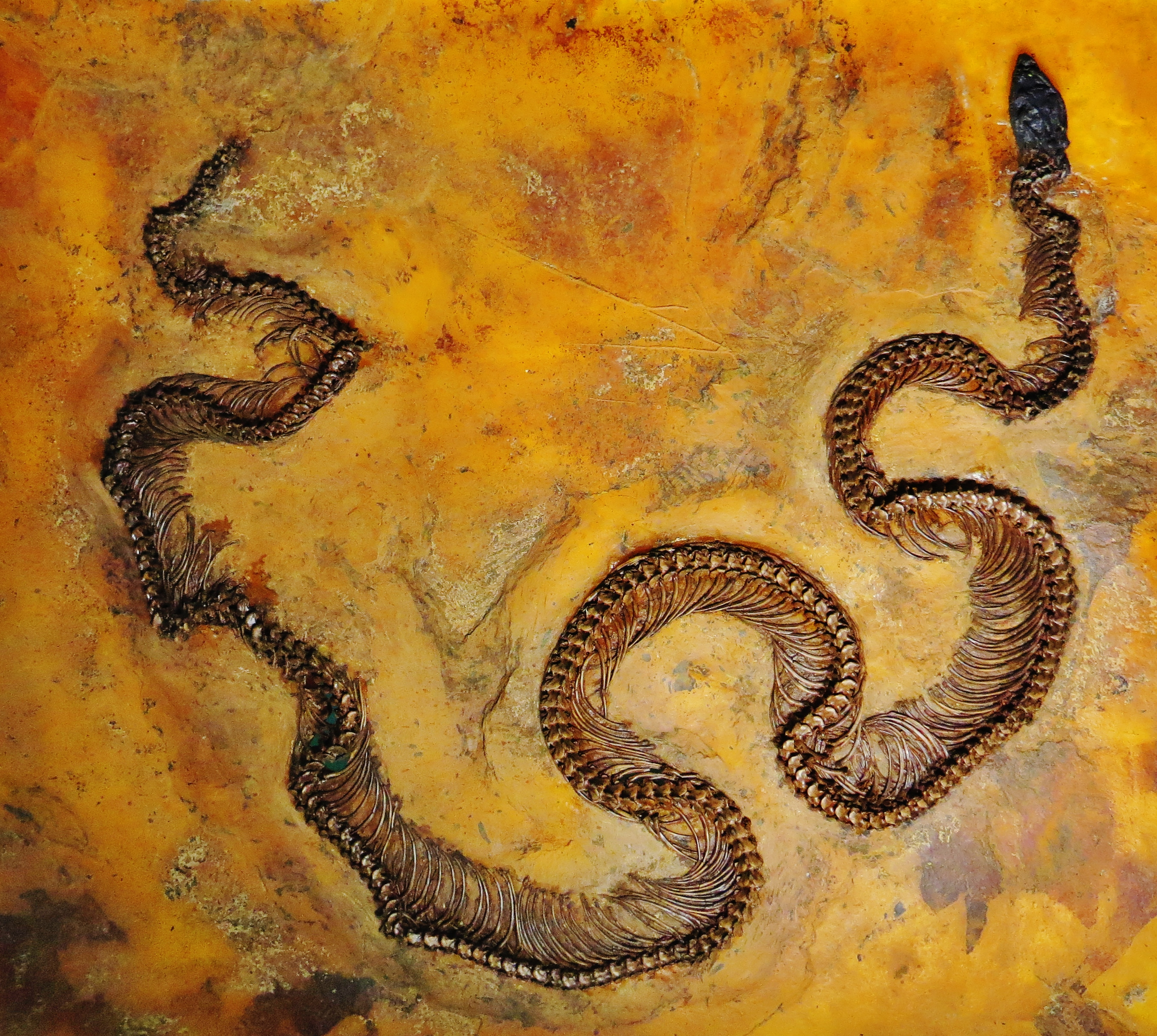
- Fossil of E. fisheri
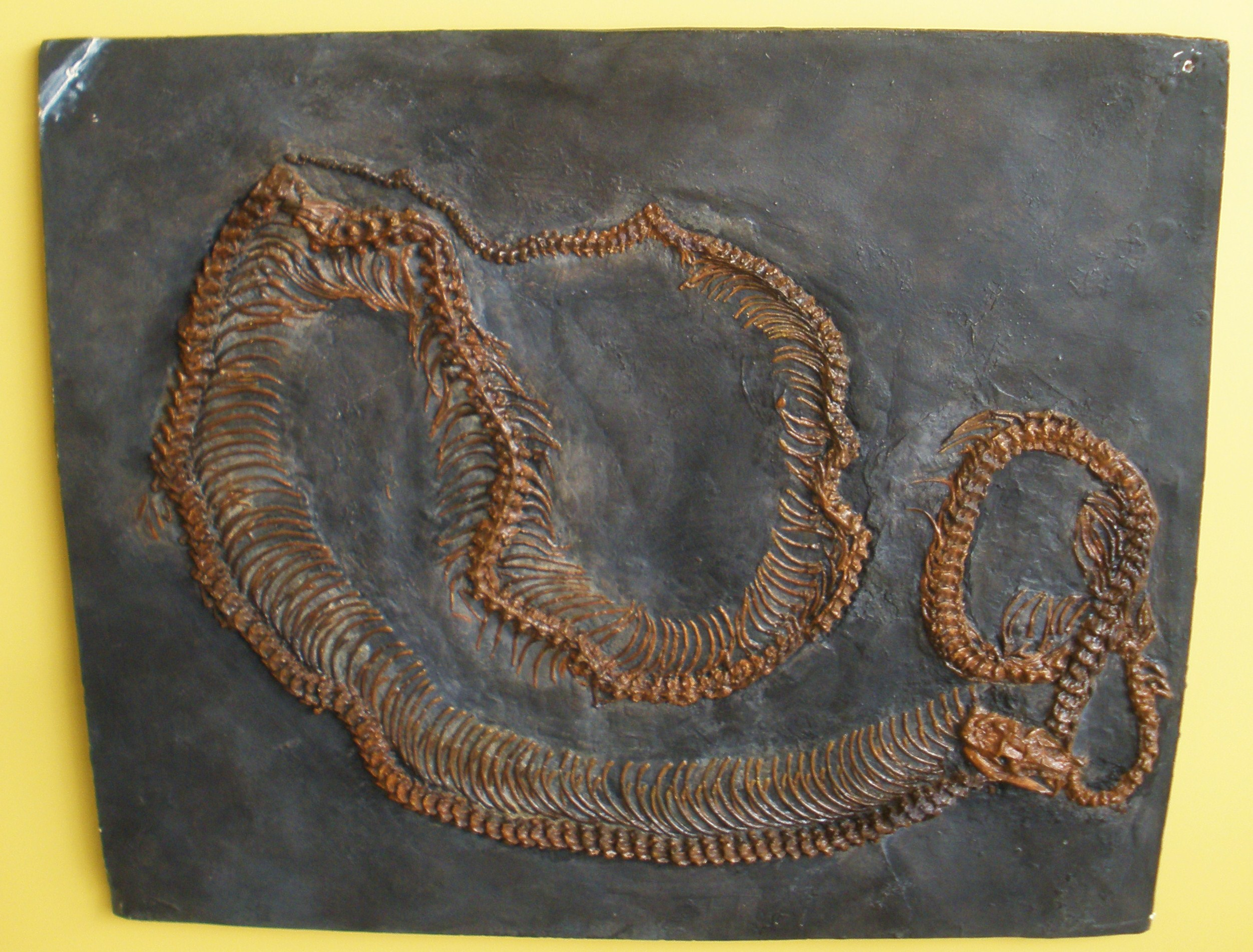
- Fossil of E. cf. fischeri

Scientific classification
- Kingdom: Animalia
- Phylum: Chordata
- Class: Reptilia
- Order: Squamata
- Suborder: Serpentes
- Superfamily: Booidea
- Genus: †Eoconstrictor; Scanferla & Smith, 2020

Type species
- Palaeopython fischeri Schaal, 2004

Species
- †E. barnesi Palci et al., 2023; †E. fischeri (Schaal, 2004); †E. spinifer Georgalis, Rabi & Smith, 2021

= Eoconstrictor =

Eoconstrictor Temporal range: Eocene, 48–33.9 Ma

Extinct genus of snakes

Eoconstrictor is an extinct genus of booid snake, from the Eocene of Germany (Messel Pit). The type species, E. fischeri is known from multiple well-preserved specimens found in the Messel Pit of Germany. It was originally named as Palaeopython fischeri by Stephan Schaal in 2004, but examination of the genus showed that it represented a distinct lineage; it was renamed as the new genus Eoconstrictor in 2020. Like modern boids, Eoconstrictor possessed pit organs on its upper jaw, which would have given it the ability to sense infrared radiation; however, all known fossils of Eoconstrictor’s stomach contents are of cold-blooded animals (such as a crocodylian (probably a Diplocynodon) and the basilisk Geiseltaliellus), suggesting that its infrared senses were unlikely to have been used for predation. In a subsequent study Georgalis, Rabi & Smith (2021) reinterpreted "Paleryx" spinifer from the Eocene Geiseltal Lagerstätte (Saxony-Anhalt, Germany) as the second species belonging to the genus Eoconstrictor. Palci et al. (2023) named the third species belonging to this genus, E. barnesi described on the basis of fossils from the Geiseltal Lagerstätte.
