= Epileolis =

Epileolis Temporal range: Late Palaeocene

Scientific classification
- Domain: Eukaryota
- Kingdom: Animalia
- Phylum: Chordata
- Class: Reptilia
- Order: Squamata
- Suborder: Iguania
- Family: Agamidae
- Genus: †Epileolis; Alifanov, 2020
- Species: †E. reshetovi

Binomial name
- †Epileolis reshetovi Alifanov, 2020

Extinct genus of reptiles

Epileolis is an extinct genus of agamid lizard that inhabited Mongolia during the Late Palaeocene. It contains a single species, Epileolis reshetovi.
