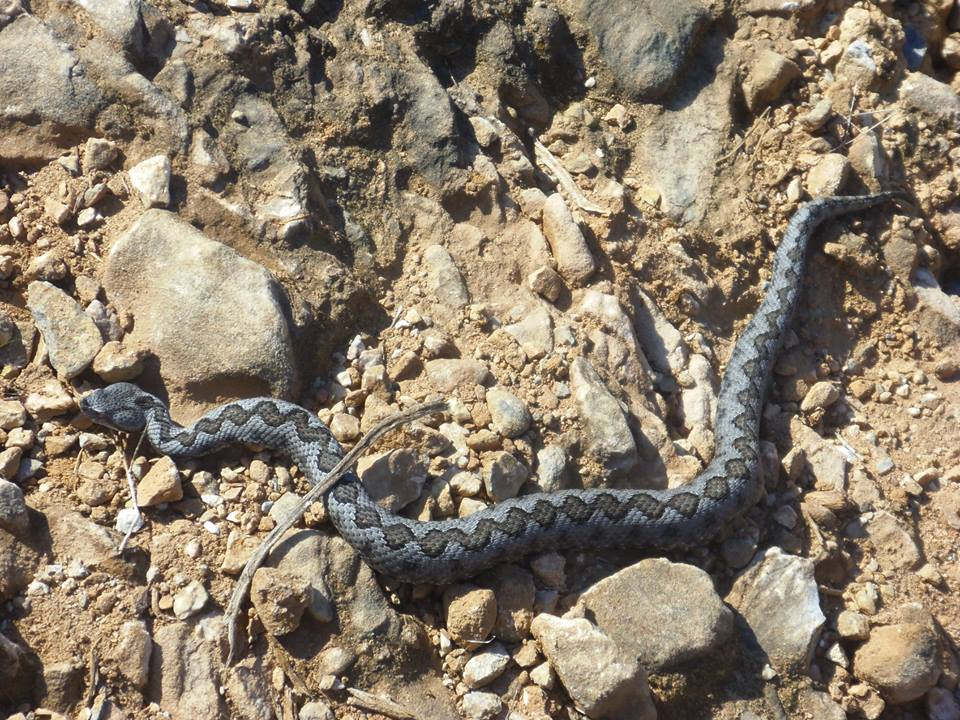

Conservation status
- Vulnerable (IUCN 3.1)

Scientific classification
- Kingdom: Animalia
- Phylum: Chordata
- Class: Reptilia
- Order: Squamata
- Suborder: Serpentes
- Family: Viperidae
- Genus: Vipera
- Species: V. latastei

Binomial name
- Vipera latastei Boscá, 1878
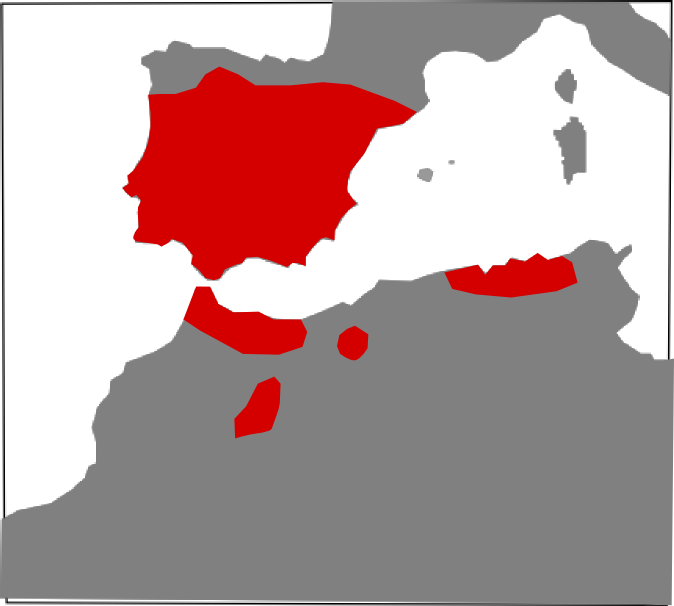
- Distribution of Vipera latasti.

Synonyms
- Vipera latasti [sic] Boscá, 1878; Vipera latastei Boscá, 1879; Vipera berus aspis var. latastei — Camerano, 1889 (nomen illegitimum); Vipera latastii [sic] Boulenger, 1896; Vipera latasti [sic] — Mertens, 1925; Latastea latastei — A.F. Reuss, 1929; Rhinaspis latastei nigricaudata A.F. Reuss, 1933; V [ipera]. ammodytes latastei — Schwarz, 1935; Vipera latastei latastei — H. Saint-Girons, 1953; Vipera (Rhinaspis) latastei latastei — Obst, 1983

= Vipera latastei =

Species of snake

Vipera latastei, also known commonly as Lataste's viper, the snub-nosed viper, and the snub-nosed adder, is a species of venomous snake in the subfamily Viperinae of the family Viperidae. The species is native to the Iberian Peninsula and northwestern Maghreb. Three extant subspecies and one extinct subspecies are currently recognized, including the nominate subspecies described here.

== Etymology ==
The specific name latastei, is in honor of Boscá's French colleague, herpetologist Fernand Lataste, who would a year later return him the honor, by naming after him a discovery of his own, Boscá's newt (Lissotriton boscai).

== Description ==
V. latastei grows to a maximum total length (including tail) of about 72 cm (28.3 in), but usually less. It is grey in colour, has a triangular head, a "horn" on the tip of its nose, and a zig-zag pattern on its back. The tip of the tail is yellow.

== Behaviour ==
V. latastei can be seen day or night but is usually hidden under rocks. The yellow tip of the tail is possibly used to lure prey.

== Geographic range ==
V. latastei is found in southwestern Europe (Portugal and Spain) and northwestern Africa (the Mediterranean region of Morocco, Algeria and Tunisia). It is possibly extinct in Tunisia.

The type locality given is "Ciudad Real ", emended to "Valencia, Spanien " (Valencia, Spain) by Mertens and L. Müller (1928).

== Habitat ==
V. latastei is found in generally moist, rocky areas, in dry scrubland and woodland, hedgerows, stone walls, and sometimes in coastal dunes.

== Reproduction ==
Females of V. latasei give birth to between two and 13 young. On average, females give birth only once every three years.

== Conservation status ==
The species V. latastei was classified as Near Threatened (NT) according to the IUCN Red List of Threatened Species (v3.1, 2001), and from 2008 is recognised as Vulnerable (VU). It is listed as such because it is probably in significant decline (but likely at a rate of less than 30% over ten years) due to widespread habitat loss and persecution throughout much of its range, thus making the species close to qualifying for Vulnerable. Further population reduction is expected, but is not likely to exceed 30% over the next 10 years, but localized extinctions in parts of its range are possible (e.g., Tunisia, Spain).

It is also listed as a strictly protected species (Appendix II) under the Berne Convention.

== Subspecies ==
| Species | Taxon author | Geographic range |
|---|---|---|
| V. l. arundana | Martínez-Freiría, Velo-Antón, Santos & Pleguezuelos, 2021 | Spain. |
| V. l. gaditana | H. Saint-Girons, 1977 | Southern Spain and Portugal, Morocco, Algeria, Tunisia. |
| V. l. latastei | Boscá, 1878 | Most of the Iberian Peninsula south of the Pyrenees. |
| †V. l. ebusitana | Torres-Roig et al., 2020 | Originally endemic to Ibiza, Spain, now it is extinct. |
