= Palauchelys =

Palauchelys Temporal range: Campanian

Scientific classification
- Kingdom: Animalia
- Phylum: Chordata
- Class: Reptilia
- Order: Testudines
- Suborder: Pleurodira
- Family: †Bothremydidae
- Genus: †Palauchelys
- Species: †P. montellanoi

Binomial name
- †Palauchelys montellanoi López-Conde et al., 2021

Extinct genus of turtles

Palauchelys is an extinct genus of bothremydid turtle that existed during the Campanian.

== Distribution ==
P. montellanoi fossils are known from the Olmos Formation of Coahuila, Mexico.
