= Vipera latastei ebusitana =

Vipera latastei ebusitana Temporal range: Pleistocene-Holocene, 0.774–0.004 Ma

Conservation status
- Extinct (2000 BC) (IUCN 3.1)

Scientific classification
- Kingdom: Animalia
- Phylum: Chordata
- Class: Reptilia
- Order: Squamata
- Suborder: Serpentes
- Family: Viperidae
- Genus: Vipera
- Species: V. latastei
- Subspecies: †V. l. ebusitana

Trinomial name
- †Vipera latastei ebusitana Torres-Roig et al., 2020

Extinct subspecies of snake

Vipera latastei ebusitana was a viper subspecies native to Ibiza, Spain that is now extinct. It was a subspecies of the Lataste's viper (Vipera latastei) and was a dwarf taxon resulting from insular evolutionary processes. Like all other vipers, it was venomous.

Phylogenetic analysis indicates that the dispersal of the ancestors of V. l. ebusitana to Ibiza, most probably from a north-east Iberian population, occurred via overwater colonization around 1.5 million years ago, well after the Messinian Salinity Crisis of the Late Miocene (5.97–5.333 Mya) when land bridges allowed terrestrial colonization of the Balearic Islands by mainland faunas. The oldest specimens of this subspecies date to the Middle Pleistocene (774ka-129ka) The complete genome of this species, that helped scientists to identify that it was a new subspecies, is based on a specimen that dates to around 16,130 BC ± 45 years. V. l. ebusitana went extinct around 4000 years ago, shortly after the first humans had arrived to Ibiza.
