= Olmos Formation =

Geologic formation in Mexico

- Stratigraphic range: Late Campanian-Early Maastrichtian
- Type: Formation

Location
- Region: Coahuila, Texas
- Country: Mexico, United States

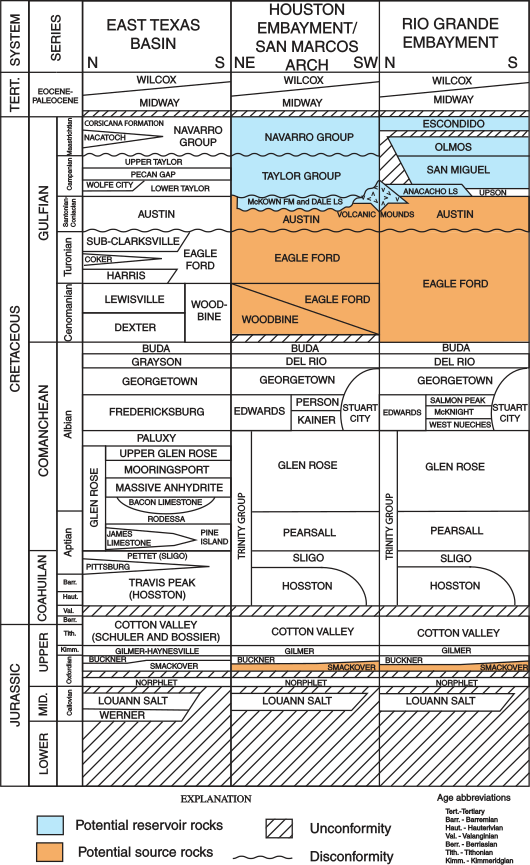
Olmos Formation stratigraphic column in Texas

The Olmos Formation is a geologic formation in Mexico. It preserves fossils of plants, hadrosaurs like Kritosaurus, ceratopsians, tyrannosaurs and the turtle Palauchelys montellanoi dating back to the Cretaceous period.

== See also ==
- List of fossiliferous stratigraphic units in Mexico
