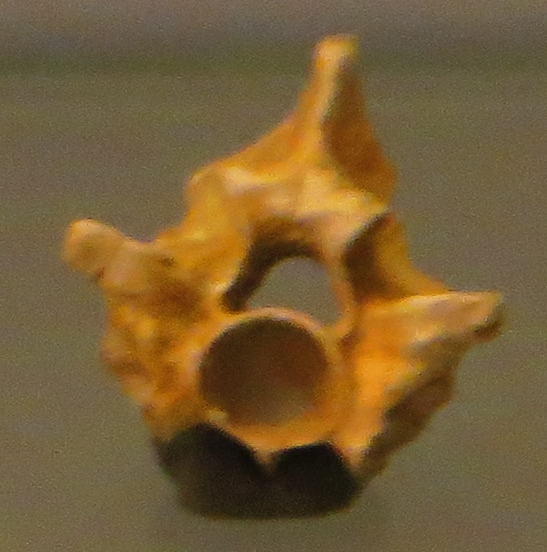
- Vertebra of Palaeopython helveticus

Scientific classification
- Kingdom: Animalia
- Phylum: Chordata
- Class: Reptilia
- Order: Squamata
- Suborder: Serpentes
- Family: Boidae
- Genus: †Palaeopython; Rochebrune, 1880

Species
- †P. cadurcensis Filhol, 1877; †P. ceciliensis Barnes, 1927; †P. helveticus Georgalis & Scheyer, 2019; †"P." neglectus Rochebrune, 1884; †"P." schaali Smith & Scanferla, 2022

= Palaeopython =

Palaeopython Temporal range: Eocene, ~48–34 Ma

Extinct genus of snakes

Palaeopython is an extinct genus of snake from the Eocene of Europe. The genus has been used to refer to large Western and Central European snake vertebrae from the Eocene. P. cadurcensis (the type species, originally named as a species of Python by Henri Filhol in 1877) and the tentatively-referred "P." neglectus (named by Alphonse Trémeau de Rochebrune in 1884) originate from France; P. ceciliensis (named by Ben Barnes in 1927) originates from Germany; and P. helveticus (named by Georgios Georgalis & Torsten Scheyer in 2019) originates from Switzerland. A species known from multiple well-preserved specimens found in the Messel Pit of Germany, P. fischeri, was named by Stephan Schaal in 2004, but examination of the genus showed that it represented a distinct lineage; it was renamed Eoconstrictor fischeri in 2020 by Agustín Scanferla and Krister T. Smith. Another species from France, P. filholii (named by Rochebrune in 1880), was moved to the genus Phosphoroboa in 2021 by Georgalis, Márton Rabi, and Smith. An additional species, P. sardus, was described in 1901 by Alessandro Portis from the Middle Miocene of Monte Albu (Sardinia, Italy). However, a reevaluation of the holotype specimen of this species revealed it to actually belong to an indeterminate acanthomorph fish. A new species, P. schaali, based on two complete skeletons from the Eocene of Messel, Germany, was described in 2022 by Smith and Scanferla.
