= Sohan Lal Jain =

Indian paleontologist (born 1929)

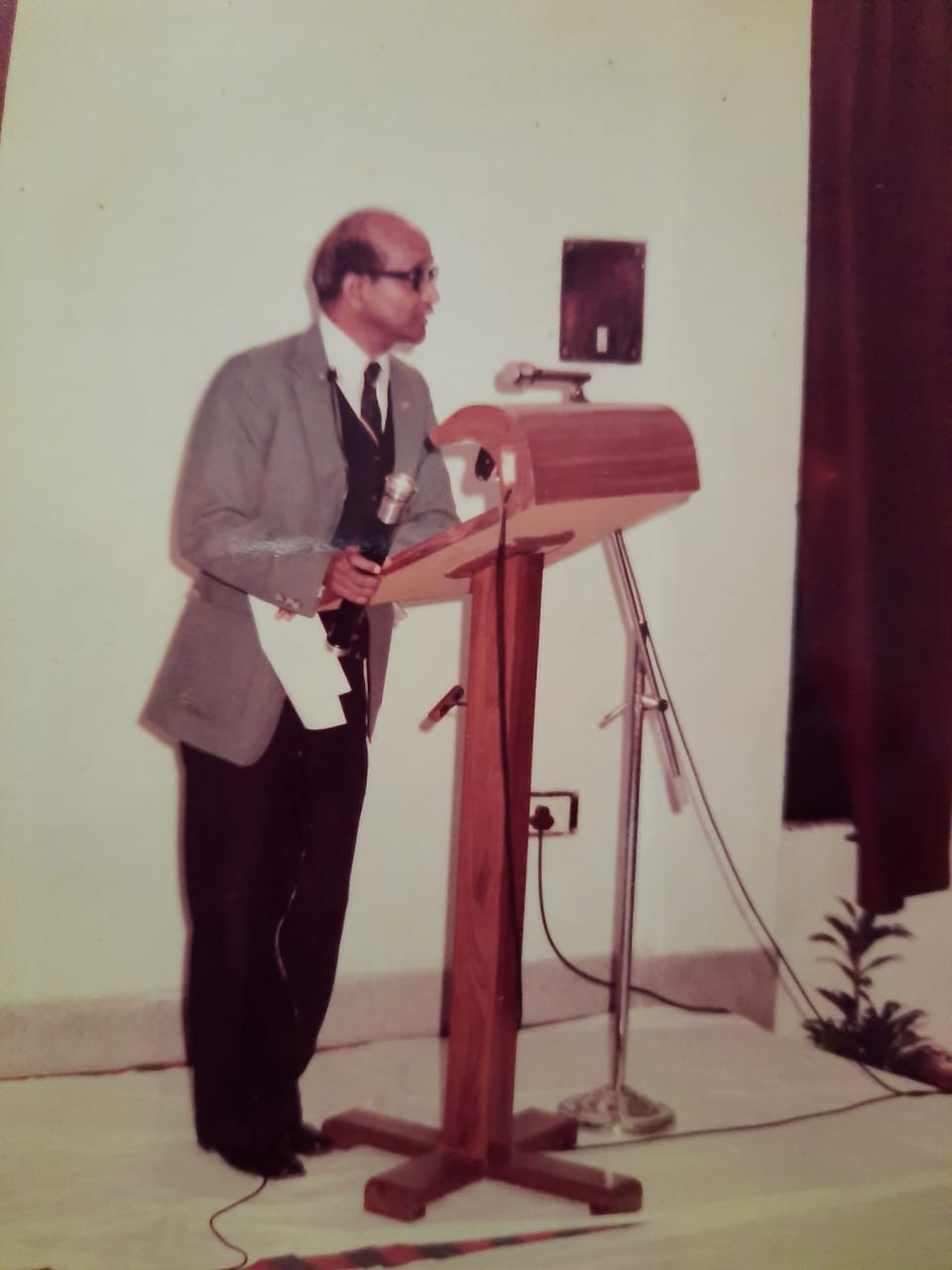
- Born: 15 December 1929 (age 95); Dehradun, British Raj (now India)
- Known for: Discoveries in paleontology within India
- Scientific career
- Fields: Paleontology (vertebrate)
- Institutions: Indian Statistical Institute
- Author abbrev. (zoology): Jain

Sohan Lal Jain (born 15 December 1929 in Dehradun) is an Indian paleontologist who worked for 33 years at the Indian Statistical Institute, Kolkata. The large herbivorous sauropod dinosaur genus Jainosaurus was named in his honour after it was identified as a distinct genus, although initially thought to be a species of Antarctosaurus. His other major contributions to paleontology were in the study of sauropod braincases and some fossil turtles.
