= List of Appalachian dinosaurs =

This is a list of dinosaurs whose remains have been recovered from Appalachia. During the Late Cretaceous period, the Western Interior Seaway divided the continent of North America into two landmasses; one in the west named Laramidia and Appalachia in the east. Since they were separated from each other, the dinosaur faunas on each of them were very different. For example, nodosaurs were common in Appalachia, but they were rare in Laramidia, and there were only specialized forms, such as Edmontonia and Panoplosaurus. This is an example of how isolated faunas develop differently.

== List of Appalachian dinosaurs ==
Name	Period	Diet	Notes	Image
Acrocanthosaurus	Lower Cretaceous	carnivore	A large carcharodontosaur from Texas and Oklahoma. Possible teeth known from Maryland.	
Ampelognathus	Upper Cretaceous	herbivore	A small ornithopod from Texas.	
Appalachiosaurus	Upper Cretaceous	carnivore	Large tyrannosauroid from Alabama.	
Arkansaurus	Lower Cretaceous	omnivore	Early ornithomimid from Arkansas.	
Astrodon	Lower Cretaceous	herbivore	Large herbivorous sauropod found in Maryland.	
Astrophocaudia	Lower Cretaceous	herbivore	Large herbivorous sauropod found in Texas.	
Cedarosaurus	Lower Cretaceous	herbivore	Large herbivorous sauropod found in the Trinity Group of Texas.	
Claosaurus	Upper Cretaceous	herbivore	Primitive hadrosauromorph. Its only known fossil specimen found appeared to have been washed into the Western Interior Seaway. It is believed to be from Appalachia because it was found closer to the Appalachia side of the sea and is unknown from Laramidia.	
"Coelosaurus"	Upper Cretaceous	omnivore	May be synonymous with Ornithomimus. Its remains have been found New Jersey.	
Convolosaurus	Lower Cretaceous	herbivore	A small ornithopod that was endemic to Texas.	
Deinonychus	Lower Cretaceous	carnivore	A dromaeosaur whose remains have been found in Oklahoma. Possible teeth found in Maryland.	
Diplotomodon	Upper Cretaceous	carnivore	Dubious name for a species of tyrannosauroid from New Jersey, possibly a Dryptosaurus or a potentially new genus.	
Dryptosaurus	Upper Cretaceous	carnivore	Medium-sized tyrannosauroid from New Jersey. It was the first theropod unearthed in North America.	
Eotrachodon	Upper Cretaceous	herbivore	Hadrosaur from Alabama known from a nearly complete skeleton.	
Hadrosaurus	Upper Cretaceous	herbivore	First known non-avian dinosaur skeleton from the United States. Discovered in 1858 in Haddonfield, New Jersey.	
Hierosaurus	Upper Cretaceous	herbivore	A dubious genus of nodosaur unearthed in Kansas.	
Hypsibema	Upper Cretaceous	herbivore	Little known hadrosaur first discovered in North Carolina in 1869. Better material of a second species was found in Missouri.	
Lophorhothon	Upper Cretaceous	herbivore	Hadrosauromorph from Alabama with skull fragments discovered. In 2021, a more complete skeleton was unearthed.	
Niobrarasaurus	Upper Cretaceous	herbivore	Another example of a nodosaurid dinosaur from Kansas.	
Ornithotarsus	Upper Cretaceous	herbivore	Junior synonym of Hadrosaurus.	
Parrosaurus	Upper Cretaceous	herbivore	Hadrosaur from Missouri. May possibly represent Junior synonym of Hypsibema missouriensis. Is the state dinosaur of Missouri.	
Pawpawsaurus	Lower Cretaceous	herbivore	Nodosaur that was unearthed in Texas.	
Priconodon	Lower Cretaceous	herbivore	Nodosaur from Maryland found only from fossilized teeth.	
Protohadros	Lower Cretaceous	herbivore	Hadrosaur from eastern Texas, which was a part of Appalachia during the formation of the Western Interior Seaway.	
Propanoplosaurus	Lower Cretaceous	herbivore	Nodosaurid dinosaur from Maryland.	
Silvisaurus	Upper Cretaceous	herbivore	Herbivorous nodosaur from the state of Kansas. Like Claosaurus, the specimen found was probably washed into the Western Interior Seaway. It is believed to be from Appalachia because it was found closer to the Appalachia side of the sea.	
Saurornitholestes	Upper Cretaceous	carnivore	A dromaeosaur endemic to Laramidia that possibly made its way to Appalachia via island hopping. Possible teeth have been found in Alabama, North Carolina and South Carolina.	
Sauroposeidon	Lower Cretaceous	herbivore	A massive sauropod whose remains have been unearthed in Texas and Oklahoma.	
Teihivenator	Upper Cretaceous	carnivore	A dubious species of tyrannosaur that was unearthed in New Jersey.	
Texasetes	Lower Cretaceous	herbivore	Another nodosaur from Texas.	
Tenontosaurus	Lower Cretaceous	herbivore	An iguanodontid whose remains have been found in Texas, Oklahoma and Maryland.	
Zephyrosaurus	Lower Cretaceous	herbivore	A small ornithopod endemic to Laramidia. Possible tracks have been discovered in Maryland and Virginia.	
