= Hudsonia (landmass) =

Land mass of Cretaceous North America

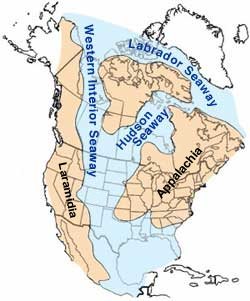
- Map of Cretaceous North America. The name "Hudsonia" refers to the blank island north of Appalachia and the Hudson Seaway.

Historical continent
- Formed: 100.5 Mya
- Type: Continent
- Today part of: Northern Canada
- Smaller continents: North America
- Tectonic plates: North American plate

Hudsonia (so-named for Hudson Bay) is the informal name for an island landmass located in the northeastern North America during various spans of the late Cretaceous (100.5 to 66 million years ago). The island was separated from Laramidia to the west by the Western Interior Seaway, and separated from Appalachia to the south by the Hudson Seaway, though it may have been connected to the latter by the end of the Cretaceous, when the seaway's began to close.

It represents the third major North American landmass of the late Cretaceous, after the more notable Laramidia and Appalachia, (usually being omitted from the list or lumped in with Appalachia) roughly covering the same area as modern day Nunavut in northern Canada. It lasted from the early Cenomanian period to the end of the Maastrichtian period. Additionally, the island was separated from Cretaceous Greenland by the Labrador Seaway to the east. There are relatively few fossil discoveries due to a variety of geographic and geological reasons when compared to Laramidia, or even Appalachia.

== Geography ==
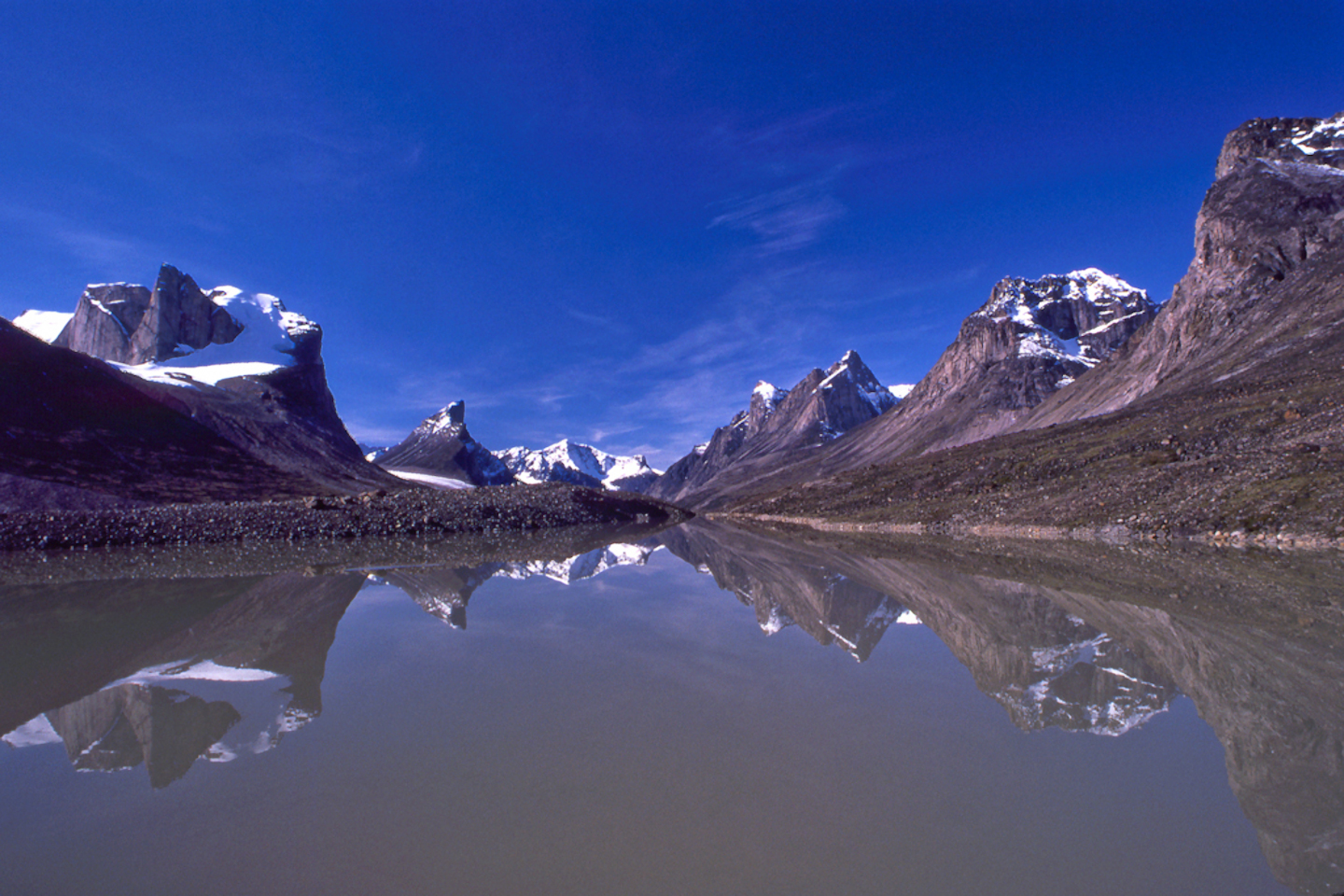
The Baffin Mountains today (Akshayuk Pass), which were the main topological feature of eastern Hudsonia.

The island spanned land today mostly consisting of the Arctic Archipelago of northern Canada, including Baffin Island and possibly parts of the Queen Elizabeth Islands, as well as most of mainland Nunavut and portions of eastern Northwest Territories. It bordered what would become Hudson Bay, then the Hudson Seaway, on the south coast facing Appalachia.

Due to differences in climate, Hudsonia in the Cretaceous was likely much warmer and more verdant than northern Canada is today, but was probably cooler than Appalachia due to its latitude, although there would have been little to no permanent snow or ice cover anywhere but mountains. Overall, the paleoclimate would have likely been similar to Appalachia. The Baffin Mountains, which dates to the Precambrian era, would have been the major geologic feature, spanning the eastern coast.

Hudsonia was at a similar latitude to Cretaceous Alaska (then part of northern Laramidia), which is represented by the prolific Prince Creek formation of fossils.

== Fossil sites ==
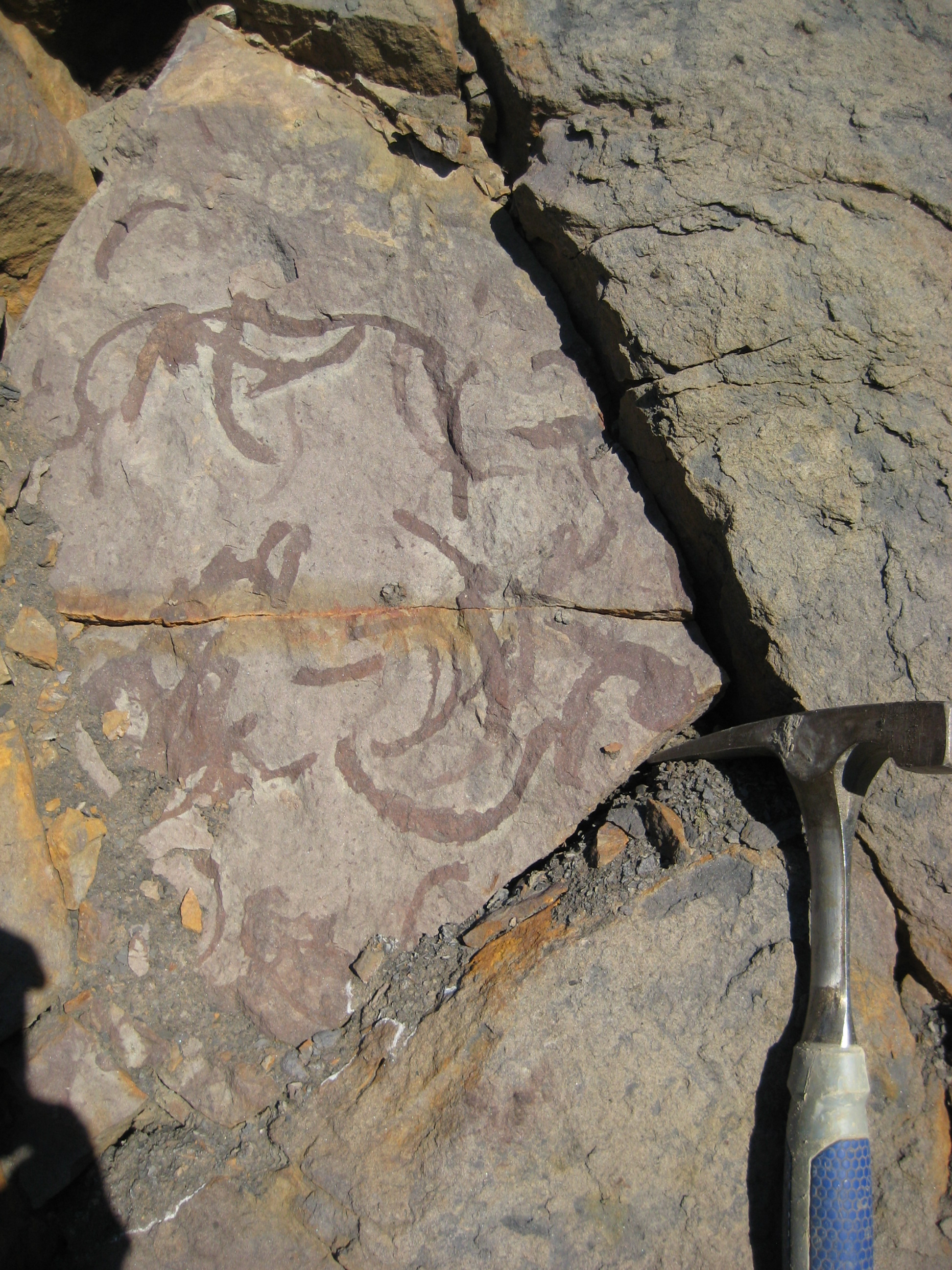
Trace fossils found on Axel Heiberg Island.

Due to high sea levels, subsequent erosion, and the lack of orogenic input of sediment into the Western Interior Seaway, compared to Laramidia, there is a paucity of fossil deposits originating from Hudsonia, similar to Appalachia. Some sediments in Hudsonia would have been removed by glacial erosion of the Laurentide Ice Sheet during Quaternary glaciations, but it is difficult to ascertain how much sediment has been removed, or whether these sediments would have been any more productive than those that remain. This is compounded by the logistical difficulty of reaching and conducting extended paleontological studies or excavations in northern Canada, namely weather and the cold, both in modern times and historically.

One of the few fossiliferous geological formations relating to Hudsonia that has been extensively studied is the Kanguk Formation, stretching across much of insular Nunavut, with a stratigraphic range of 99 to 66 million years ago. It is composed of dark shale and siltstone with interbeds of sandstone, bentonite and tuff.

Major fossil sites in the Kanguk formation include Bylot island (Maastrichtian) just north of Baffin Island, and Axel Heiberg Island (Cenomanian) in the Queen Elizabeth Islands, where the formation itself was first described in 1963. Other smaller finds have been located on western Ellesmere island and northern Devon Island (both Campanian).

== Paleoecology ==
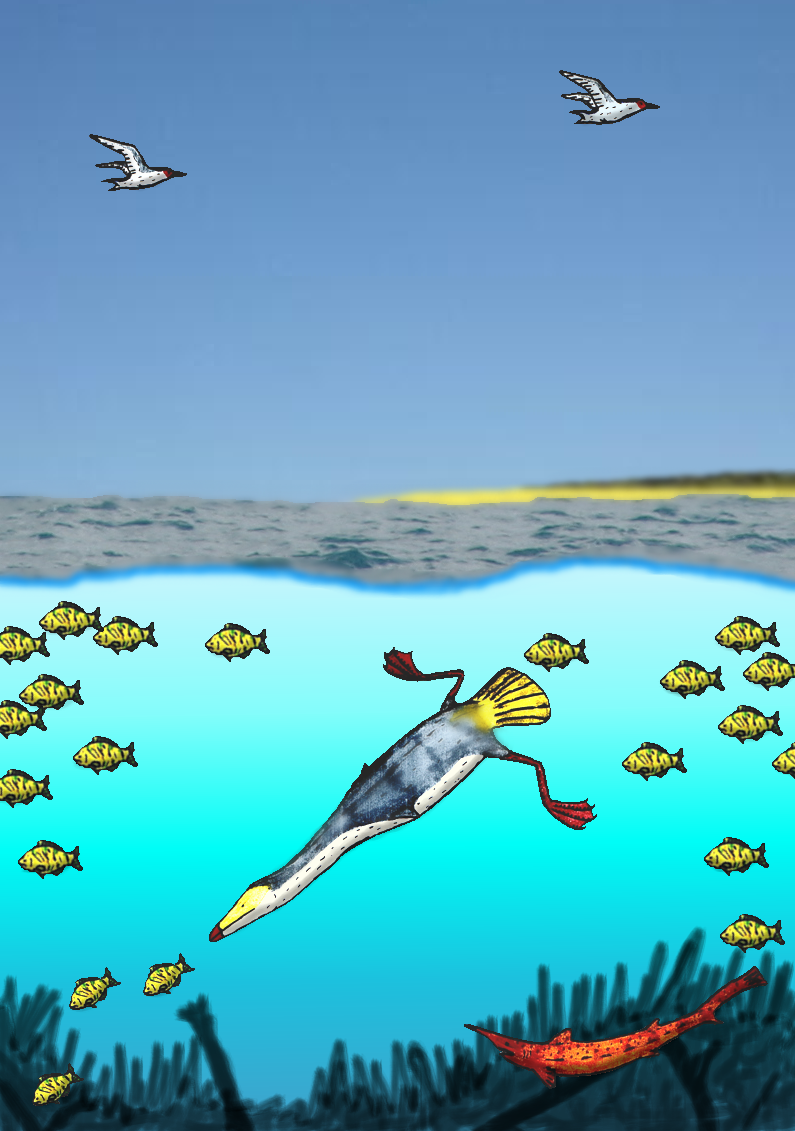
Illustration of Canadaga diving for fish off the eastern coast of Hudsonia.

Much of the macrobiota unearthed from Hudsonia has been reptilian (all so far from the Kanguk Formation), including many Dinosaurs. One of the only named Dinosaur species is Canadaga Arctica, a flightless diving toothed seabird (Hesperornithid) that lived in the shallow coastal waters of the Labrador Seaway; it is a unique genus to Hudsonia. Another unique Hudsonian Dinosaur is Tingmiatornis Arctica, a flying and diving bird-like Ornithuran, from the Turonian period. Indeterminate Dinosaur remains found in the formation include those of Hadrosaurs, Tyrannosaurs, and Ornithomimids.

Other named species include Aurorachelyus, a turtle species unique to Hudsonia, and Champsosaurus, a crocodile-like choristodere. Plesiosaur and Mosasaur remains have also been found, as well as many fossil fish.

== See also ==
- List of Appalachian dinosaurs
- Laurentia – Craton forming the geological core of North America
- Paleontology in Nunavut
