= ReBecca Hunt-Foster =

American paleontologist

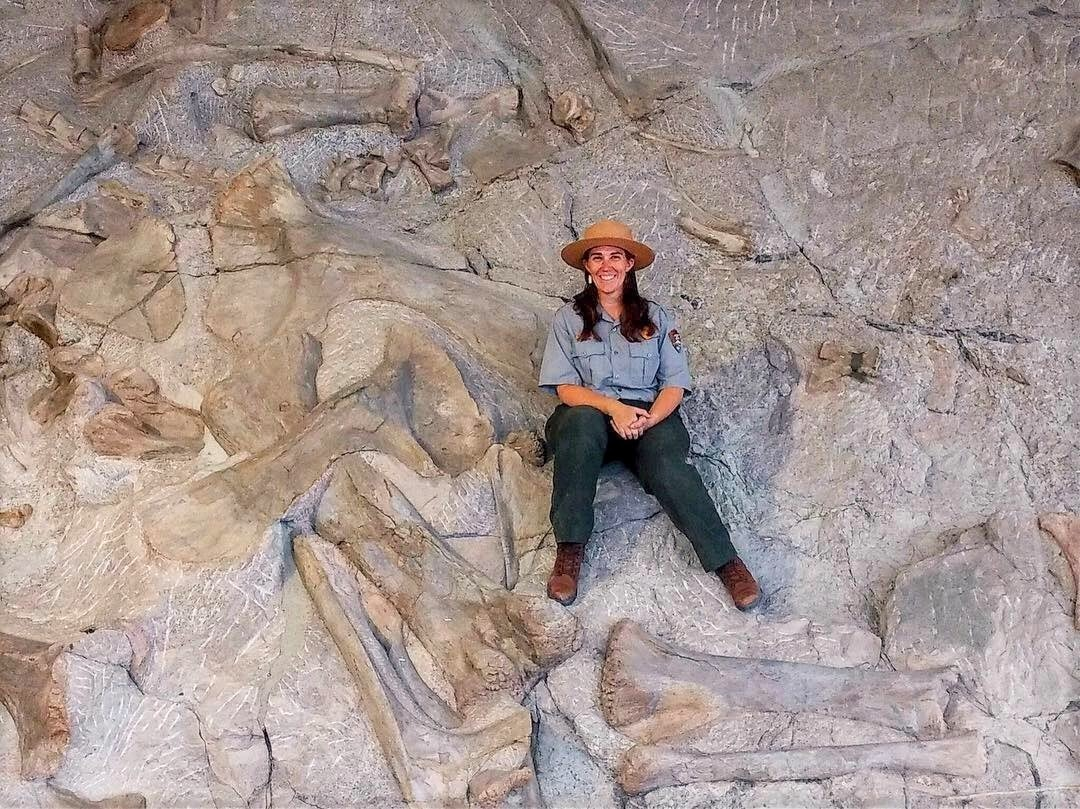
- Education: University of Arkansas, Texas Tech University
- Known for: Cretaceous dinosaurs
- Spouse: John R. Foster
- Scientific career
- Fields: Paleontologist
- Institutions: National Park Service

ReBecca Hunt-Foster is an American paleontologist. She has worked with dinosaur remains from the Late Jurassic to Late Cretaceous of the Colorado Plateau, Rocky Mountains, Southcentral, and the Southwestern United States of America. She described the dinosaur Arkansaurus fridayi and identified the first juvenile Torosaurus occurrences from Big Bend National Park in North America in 2008.

== Career ==
- Mulberry High School, Mulberry, Arkansas. 1998
- B.S. Earth Sciences, University of Arkansas, Fayetteville, Arkansas. 2003
- M.S. Geology, Texas Tech University, Lubbock, Texas. 2005

Hunt-Foster is the park paleontologist for the National Park Service at Dinosaur National Monument, where she has worked since August 2018. Previously she was the district paleontologist for the Bureau of Land Management–Utah, where she has worked from 2013 to 2018. She was employed for five years as paleontology collections manager at the Museums of Western Colorado from 2007 to 2012 and a research assistant at Augustana College from 2005 to 2008.

=== Professional work ===
Hunt-Foster's current research includes Early Cretaceous ornithomimosaurs from North America, the Upper Cretaceous Williams Fork Formation paleofauna of western Colorado, the ichnofauna of the lower Jurassic to lower Cretaceous rocks of southeastern Utah. ReBecca has worked as a paleontologist in western Colorado and eastern Utah since 2007. Prior to moving to the area, ReBecca was a research assistant at Augustana College where she worked on latest Cretaceous ceratopsian dinosaurs from southern Laramidia and preparing Cryolophosaurus, the first known dinosaur from Antarctica. She has also worked on Precambrian stromatolites and the geology of Glacier National Park.

== Popular books ==
Hunt-Foster is the coauthor of "Behavioral interpretations from chasmosaurine ceratopsid bonebeds: a review." with Andrew Farke, in the 2010 book New Perspectives on Horned Dinosaurs.

== Bibliography ==
- Hunt-Foster, ReBecca K. 2016. The Macomb Expedition. Sojourns: Landscapes for the People 11(2): 58-59.
- Hunt-Foster, ReBecca K., Martin G. Lockley, Andrew R.C. Milner, John R. Foster, Neffra A. Matthews. Brent H. Breithaupt, and Joshua A. Smith. 2016. Tracking dinosaurs in BLM Canyon Country, Utah: Geology of the Intermountain West 3: 67–100
- Kirkland, James I., Marina Suarez, Celina Suarez, and ReBecca K. Hunt-Foster, 2016. The Lower Cretaceous in east-central Utah—the Cedar Mountain Formation and its bounding strata: Geology of the Intermountain West 3: 101–228
- Foster, John R. and ReBecca K. Hunt-Foster. 2015. First report of a giant neosuchian (Crocodyliformes) in the Williams Fork Formation (Upper Cretaceous: Campanian) of Colorado. Cretaceous Research 55: 66-73.
- Kirkland, Jim, John Foster, ReBecca K. Hunt-Foster, Gregory A. Liggett, and Kelli Trujillo. 2014. Mid-Mesozoic: The Age of Dinosaurs in Transition. Conference Proceedings, 88p.
- Trujillo, Kelli C., John R. Foster, ReBecca K. Hunt-Foster, and Kevin R. Chamberlain. 2014. A U/Pb age for the Mygatt-Moore Quarry, Upper Jurassic Morrison Formation, Mesa County, Colorado. Volumina Jurassica XII(2): 107-114.
- Lockley, Martin G., ReBecca K. Hunt-Foster, John R. Foster, Ken Cart, and Scott Gerwe. 2014. Early Jurassic track assemblages from the Granite Creek Area of Eastern Utah. In Lockley, M.G. and Lucas, S.G., eds., Fossil footprints of western North America. New Mexico Museum of Natural History and Science Bulletin 62: 205-210
- Lockley, Martin G., Gerard D. Gierlinski, Karen Houck, Jong-Deock Lim, Kyung Soo Kim, Dal-Yong Kim, Tae Hyeong Kim, Seung-Hyeop Kang, ReBecca K. Hunt-Foster, Rihui Li, Christopher Chesser, Rob Gay, Zofia Dubicka, Ken Cart, and Christy Wright. 2014. New excavations at the Mill Canyon Dinosaur Track Site (Cedar Mountain Formation, Lower Cretaceous) of Eastern Utah. In Lockley, M.G. and Lucas, S.G., eds., Fossil footprints of western North America. New Mexico Museum of Natural History and Science Bulletin 62: 287-300
- Foster, John R. and ReBecca K. Hunt-Foster. 2011. New occurrences of dinosaur skin of two types (Sauropoda? and Dinosauria indet.) from the Late Jurassic of North America (Mygatt-Moore Quarry, Morrison Formation). Journal of Vertebrate Paleontology 31(3): 717-721.
- Hunt, ReBecca K. and Andrew A. Farke. 2010. Behavioral interpretations from chasmosaurine ceratopsid bonebeds: a review. Pages 447-455 in M. J. Ryan, B. J. Chinnery-Allgeier, and D. A. Eberth (eds.), New Perspectives on Horned Dinosaurs. Indiana University Press, Bloomington.
- Hunt-Foster, ReBecca K. 2010. Packing methods for domestic and international fossil shipping. Pages 97–102 in M.A. Brown, J.F. Kane, and W.G. Parker, (ed.s), Methods in Fossil Preparation: Proceedings of the First Annual Fossil Preparation and Collections Symposium.
- Hunt, ReBecca K. and Thomas M. Lehman. 2008. Attributes of the ceratopsian dinosaur Torosaurus, and new material from the Javelina Formation (Maastrichtian) of Texas. Journal of Paleontology 82(6): 1127-1138.
- Hunt, ReBecca K. 2006. Middle Proterozoic Paleontology of the Belt Supergroup, Glacier National Park. Pages 57–62 in S.G. Lucas, J.A. Spielmann, P.M. Hester, J.P. Kenworthy, and V.L. Santucci (ed.s), Fossils from Federal Lands: 7th Federal Fossil Conference. New Mexico Museum of Natural History and Science Bulletin 34.
- Hunt, ReBecca K., Vincent L. Santucci, and Jason P. Kenworthy. 2006. A preliminary inventory of fossil fish from National Park Service units. Pages 63–69 in S.G. Lucas, J.A. Spielmann, P.M. Hester, J.P. Kenworthy, and V.L. Santucci (ed.s), Fossils from Federal Lands: 7th Federal Fossil Conference. New Mexico Museum of Natural History and Science Bulletin 34.
- Hunt, ReBecca K., Daniel Chure, and Leo Carson Davis. 2003. An early Cretaceous theropod foot from southwestern Arkansas. Pages 87–103 in Proceedings of the 2003 Arkansas Undergraduate Research Conference.
