= Western Interior Seaway anoxia =

Anoxia events in the Western Interior Seaway

Three Western Interior Seaway anoxic events occurred during the Cretaceous in the shallow inland seaway that divided North America in two island continents, Appalachia and Laramidia (see map). During these anoxic events much of the water column was depleted in dissolved oxygen. While anoxic events impact the world's oceans, Western Interior Seaway anoxic events exhibit a unique paleoenvironment compared to other basins. The notable Cretaceous anoxic events in the Western Interior Seaway mark the boundaries at the Aptian-Albian, Cenomanian-Turonian, and Coniacian-Santonian stages, and are identified as Oceanic Anoxic Events I, II, and III respectively. The episodes of anoxia came about at times when very high sea levels coincided with the nearby Sevier orogeny that affected Laramidia to the west and Caribbean large igneous province to the south, which delivered nutrients and oxygen-adsorbing compounds into the water column.

Most anoxic events are recognized using the ^{13}C isotope as a proxy to indicate total organic carbon preserved in sedimentary rocks. If there is very little oxygen, then organic material that settles to the bottom of the water column will not be degraded as readily compared to normal oxygen settings and can be incorporated into the rock. ^{13}C_{organic} is calculated by comparing the amount of ^{13}C to a carbon isotope standard, and using multiple samples can track changes (δ) in organic carbon content through rocks over time, forming a δ^{13}C_{organic} curve. The δ^{13}C_{organic}, as a result, serves as a benthic oxygen curve.

The organic carbon preservation brought about by these successive anoxic events makes Western Interior Seaway strata some of the richest source rocks for oil and gas.

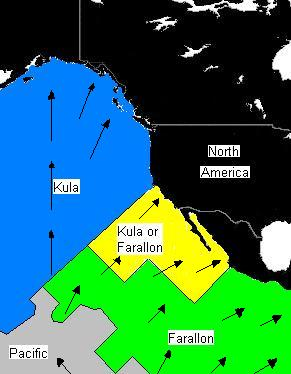
Farallon, Kula, and North American plate distribution between 64 and 74 million years ago. Arrows represent vectors (magnitude and direction) of plate motion. Black represents present-day land area.

== Western Interior Seaway tectonics and geography ==
During the Cretaceous Period, along the western shore of the Western Interior Seaway there was active volcanism and foreland subsidence brought about by the Sevier orogeny, formed by the convergence of the oceanic Farallon and Kula plates with the North American plate. Active volcanism during the Sevier orogeny was the product of partial melting of the subducting Farallon and Kula plates: that resulting melt traveled up through the overlying North American plate, creating a belt of active volcanos. Most active volcanism occurred in the extreme northern and southern portions of the western shoreline of the Western Interior Seaway.

To the east of the orogeny, a back-arc basin formed due to the warping of the North American plate in response to the horizontal stress of the subducting oceanic plates. The low-lying area was under water throughout the Cretaceous due to the warm climate causing the planet's ocean waters to expand and flood the continent's interior. Sea level during Oceanic Anoxic Event II at the Cenomanian-Turonian boundary was at its highest of the Cretaceous due to high global temperatures. At that time, the Western Interior Seaway stretched from the Boreal Sea (present Arctic Sea) to the Tethys Sea (present Gulf of Mexico), making it 6000 km long and 2000 km wide. The deepest portions were around 500 m deep.

Formation of the Caribbean Plate in the Tethys Sea near the southern region of the Western Interior Seaway created a large igneous province (called the Caribbean Plateau) that produced underwater lava flows from 95-87 million years ago.

== Anoxic events ==
External image
- nature.com A flow chart of magma sourcing trace metals, ocean fertilization, stratification, and anoxia.

=== Nutrient sourcing ===
Ash and dissolved trace metals from Sevier and Caribbean eruptions provided nutrients to the water column, which was the driving mechanism for anoxia in the Western Interior Seaway. Ash from volcanic eruptions is the source of thick bentonite layers in Western Interior Seaway strata. Ash contains trace metals that, while in low concentration, provide nutrients to microorganisms that live in the water column. Caribbean Plateau lavas sourced hydrothermal fluids containing trace metals and sulfides. Together both events enriched the chemistry of the water column by fertilizing the photosynthesizing microorganisms, which are the ocean's primary producers. Increases in primary production will affect the rest of the water column by increasing the biomass (the density of organisms in a certain volume), which will use up much of the available oxygen both during metabolism and once dead, during the processes of decay. Additionally, dissolved oxygen passively binds to metals and sulfides, further depleting the oxygen in the water column.

=== Stratification ===
A significant loss of oxygen leads to environmental perturbations. Water column stratification can occur when the zone below the sediment-water interface that is normally devoid of oxygen moves up above the sediment and into the water column. While this is a common phenomenon in deep water, this is interpreted to have occurred during anoxic settings in the shallow Western Interior Seaway as evidenced by extinctions of benthic fauna at the Cenomanian-Turonian Boundary Event brought about by Oceanic Anoxic Event II. The extinction can be explained by ocean stratification causing low-oxygen conditions in the benthic zone. Further, increasing primary production of marine plankton causes an excess of metabolic waste products, notably overproduction of CO_{2} during processes of organic decay. When CO_{2} combines with water molecules it reduces the alkalinity of seawater. Eventually the ocean can become so acidified that calcite cannot be incorporated into the hard parts of shelly organisms (biomineralized) and therefore toxic to live in.

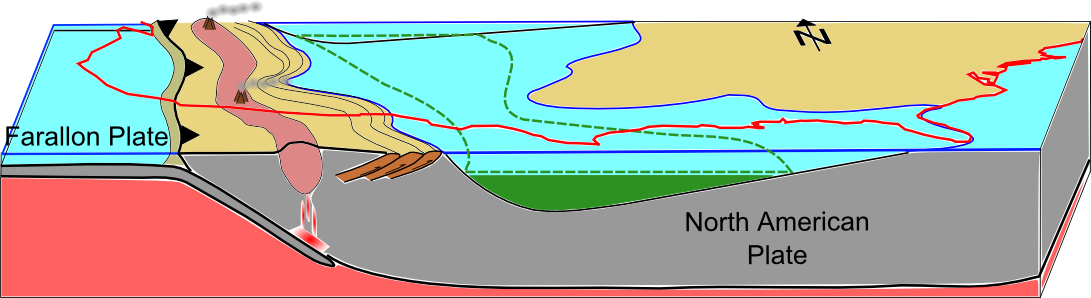
A look down the Western Interior Seaway during Oceanic Anoxic Event II. The structure of the North American plate and sea level (blue line) projected over the United States of America (red line) with nutrient sourcing from volcanoes along the convergent margin, and the resulting water column stratification (green) and its extent throughout the basin (dashed green line).

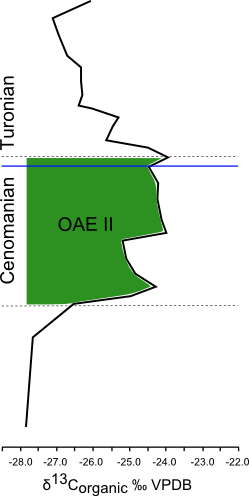
The ^{13}C_{organic} Curve for the duration of Oceanic Anoxic Event II (OAE II, highlighted in green)showing change in ^{13}C_{organic} compared to a standard (Vienna Pee Dee Belemnite) through time (y-axis) across the Cenomanian-Turonian Stage Boundary (about 93.9 million years ago).

== Alternate theories to anoxic events in the Western Interior Seaway ==
=== Oceanic Anoxic Event II ===
Western Interior Seaway strata preserve the positive^{13}C_{organic} excursion during Oceanic Anoxic Event II, meaning there was excellent preservation of organic carbon. However, other evidence is conflicting. Molybdenum, an oxygen-sensitive trace metal, will be present in unoxidized form in strata only if there is anoxia. One study showed lack of molybdenum in Oceanic Anoxic Event II strata. Other studies demonstrated the persistence of benthic organisms that could not live in anoxic settings throughout the entirety of Oceanic Anoxic Event II. Consequently, there is a difference in opinion of the relationship between benthic oxygen conditions and what a positive shift of the ^{13}C_{organic} curve represents. Anoxia in the Western Interior Seaway during Oceanic Anoxic Event II is still an enigma.

==== Anoxic vs. dysoxic hypothesis ====
Oceanic Anoxic Event II is believed to have caused the longest duration and most potent water column stratification in Western Interior Seaway history. Although there has been much research devoted to Western Interior Seaway strata, the impact of Oceanic Anoxic Event II on the oxygen content of the benthic zone is still contested. Some relatively recent research suggests that Western Interior Seaway waters during Oceanic Anoxic Event II were dysoxic (2.0 - 0.2 mL of O_{2}/L of H_{2}O[with oxic being > 2.0 mL of O_{2}/L]) rather than anoxic (< 0.2 mL of O_{2}/L of H_{2}O). Dysoxic water can be interpreted as having a moderate amount of oxygen, or oxygen varying through time between oxic and anoxic, oxic and dysoxic, or dysoxic and anoxic conditions. If the benthic oxygen was variable, the rates of change in the oxygen will affect organic carbon preservation, benthic fossil abundance and diversity, and oxygen-sensitive trace metal concentrations.

==== Circulation models ====
It has been argued that the Western Interior Seaway could have had patches of anoxia, or places where water is stratified. This would be represented by variations in ^{13}C_{organic} levels in rocks deposited at the same time in different parts of the seaway.

Some models of Western Interior Seaway water circulation indicate that waters were homogenously mixed and not stratified. The seaway, when modeled as a large bay, can have a very broad gyre formed from moving warm salt-rich water from the Tethys northward along the eastern shore, and cool Boreal waters southward along the western shore. While waters of differing salinity and temperatures could become stratified, models predict that the seaway was well-mixed due to the circulation gyre.
