= Appalachia (landmass) =

Mesozoic land mass separated from Laramidia to the west by the Western Interior Seaway

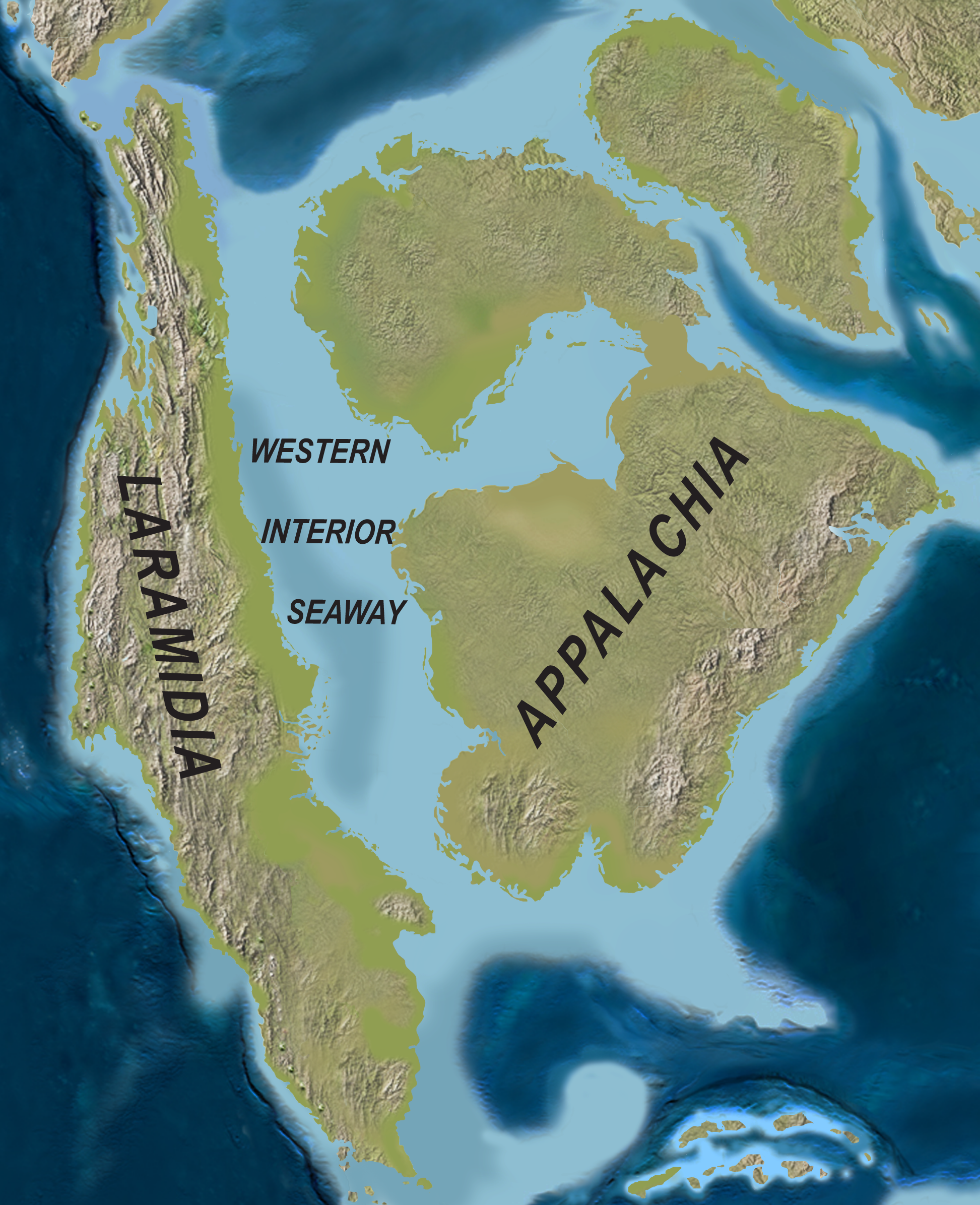
- Appalachia along with Laramidia during the Campanian.

Historical continent
- Formed: 100.5 Mya
- Type: Continent
- Today part of: Eastern Canada; Eastern United States; Midwestern United States; Southeastern United States
- Smaller continents: North America
- Tectonic plates: North American plate

During most of the Late Cretaceous (100.5 to 66 million years ago) the eastern half of North America formed Appalachia (named for the Appalachian Mountains), an island land mass separated from Laramidia to the west by the Western Interior Seaway, and from Hudsonia by the Hudson Seaway. This seaway had split North America into two massive landmasses due to a multitude of factors such as tectonism and sea-level fluctuations for nearly 40 million years. The seaway eventually expanded, divided across the Dakotas, and by the end of the Cretaceous, it retreated towards the Gulf of Mexico and the Hudson Bay.

This left the island masses joined in the continent of North America as the Rocky Mountains rose. From the Cenomanian to the end of the Campanian ages of the Late Cretaceous, Appalachia was separated from the rest of North America. As the Western Interior Seaway retreated in the Maastrichtian, Laramidia and Appalachia eventually connected. Until this connection, its fauna was isolated, and developed very differently from the tyrannosaur, ceratopsian, hadrosaurid, pachycephalosaur and ankylosaurid dominated fauna of the western part of North America, known as "Laramidia".

Due to high sea levels, subsequent erosion, and the lack of orogenic input of sediment into the Western Interior Seaway unlike the east coast of Laramidia, no terrestrially formed deposits have survived, with most dinosaur remains originating from seaborne carcasses that were transported into marine environments. This same lack of terrestrial sediments is also present on the western coast of Laramidia. Some sediments in the northern part of the range have been removed by glacial erosion of the Laurentide Ice Sheet during Quaternary glaciations, but it is difficult to ascertain how much sediment has been removed, or whether these sediments would have been any more productive than those that remain. Thus relatively little is known about Appalachia in comparison to Laramidia, with the exception of plant life, marine life and the insects trapped in amber from New Jersey.

In addition, many fossils that have been found in Appalachia lie unstudied and remain in the genera to which they were assigned in the days of Edward Drinker Cope and Othniel Charles Marsh. Only a few fossils of the terrestrial creatures found in this region provide a glimpse into life during the Cretaceous period. However, the area has seen a bit of a resurgence of interest due to several discoveries made in the past few years. As mentioned earlier, not much is known about Appalachia, but some fossil sites, such as the Woodbine Formation, Navesink Formation, Ellisdale Fossil Site, Mooreville Chalk Formation, Demopolis Chalk Formation, Black Creek Group and the Niobrara Formation, together with ongoing research in the area, have contributed to piecing together the paleontological history of the area.

== Geography ==
Appalachia stretched from Quebec and Newfoundland and Labrador all the way down to the Eastern United States and west to the Midwestern United States. Fossils found in these regions indicate that the area was covered in coastal plains and coastal lowlands during the Cretaceous period. Some scientists have proposed the idea that an archipelago of islands had formed during the time that the Western Interior Seaway had divided Laramidia and Appalachia until the end of the Cretaceous. This archipelago would have allowed dinosaurs to migrate into the Gulf Coast and possibly explain why there are some noticeable distinctions between the fauna in the two assemblages of Appalachia.

For instance, the southeastern assemblage (which consists of the Carolinas and the Gulf Coast sites) has some tyrannosauroids such as Appalachiosaurus, some hadrosauroids such as Eotrachodon and Lophorhothon, nodosaurs, dromaeosaurs, and new leptoceratopsian while the northern assemblage (which consists of New Jersey, Delaware, and Maryland) has some tyrannosauroids such as Dryptosaurus, hadrosauroids such as Hadrosaurus, smaller theropods, and a possible lambeosaur in the area.

== Range ==
Vertebrate fossils have been found along the Atlantic Seaboard as well as other states like Alabama, Georgia, North Carolina, South Carolina, Mississippi, Missouri, Kentucky, Tennessee, Kansas, Nebraska, Iowa, and Minnesota. Parts of Canada that were a part of Appalachia during the Cretaceous include, Manitoba, Ontario, Quebec, Nunavut, New Brunswick, Newfoundland and Labrador, and Nova Scotia.

== Fauna ==
=== Dinosaurs ===
From the Cenomanian to the Maastrichtian, Appalachia was inhabited by various groups of dinosaurs, including hadrosauroids, hadrosaurs, nodosaurs, leptoceratopsians, indeterminate ornithopods, tyrannosauroids, dromaeosaurs, ornithomimids, and indeterminate maniraptors. There is also plausible fossil evidence of chasmosaurs, lambeosaurs, sauropods, carcharodontosaurs, caenagnathids, troodontids, and coelurosaurs that might have inhabited the area. In 2022, fossils unearthed from the Woodbine Formation in Texas confirmed that carcharodontosaurs, troodontids, and coelurosaurs did indeed inhabit Appalachia.

==== Tyrannosaurs ====
In Late Cretaceous North America, the dominant predators were the Tyrannosauroidea, huge predatory theropods built for ripping flesh from their prey. In Appalachia, dryptosaurs were the top predators in this clade. Rather than developing the huge heads and massive bodies of their western relatives such as Gorgosaurus, Albertosaurus and Lythronax, dryptosaurs had more in common with the basal tyrannosaurs like Dilong and Eotyrannus. Dryptosaurs were characterized by long arms with three fingers; while they were not as large as the largest tyrannosaurids, fossils from the Potomac Formation in New Jersey show that some of them did evolve some of the large-bodied features that can be found on other tyrannosaurs. Three genera of valid Appalachian tyrannosaurs are known, Dryptosaurus, Appalachiosaurus, and the recently discovered Teihivenator while other indeterminate fossils lie scattered throughout most of the southern United States like Georgia, North Carolina, and South Carolina. Fossil foot bones from Appalachian deposits indicate another, unnamed tyrannosauroid measuring 9 m (30 ft), indicating that diversity in these basal tyrannosauroids remained high during the Late Cretaceous.

These fossilized teeth possibly belong to a species of Appalachiosaurus or an undescribed species of a new tyrannosaur. There is also the possibility of a fourth tyrannosaur known from Applachia known as Diplotomodon, but the genus is considered dubious. Fossils from New Jersey and Delaware, most notably in the Mt. Laurel Formation and Merchantville Formations, have revealed that the primitive tyrannosauroids were much more diverse than expected, and some of them grew to lengths of 8 to 9 meters long, making them around the same size as some of the more advanced tyrannosaurs found in Laramidia. Fossils in Cenomanian deposits further indicate tyrannosauroids had been a constant presence in Appalachia since the Middle Cretaceous.

==== Dromaeosaurs ====
The dryptosaurs were not the only predatory dinosaurs in Appalachia. Indeterminate dromaeosaur fossils, possibly belonging to Velociraptorinae and Saurornitholestinae, and teeth, most closely matching those of Saurornitholestes, have also been unearthed in Appalachia as well; mostly in the southern states like Missouri, North Carolina, South Carolina, Alabama, Mississippi and Georgia. Finds from the Campanian Tar Heel Formation in North Carolina indicate that there may have been dromaeosaurids of considerable size; intermediate between genera such as Saurornitholestes and Dakotaraptor. Though known only from teeth, the discovery indicates large dromaeosaurids were part of Appalachia's fauna. Along with the dromaeosaurid remains, tyrannosauroid and possible ornithomimid remains have been unearthed in Missouri as well. It should also be noted that dromaeosaur remains are more commonly found in the southern region of Appalachia when compared to the northern region, with their sizes ranging from smaller forms to gigantic forms. Recent fossils unearthed in New Jersey show that maniraptorans were present in Appalachia as well.

==== Ornithomimids ====
Various ornithomimid bones, such as Coelosaurus, have also been reported from Appalachia from Missouri, Mississippi, Alabama, Georgia and as far north in states like Maryland, New Jersey, and Delaware, but it is now believed that some of these are the bones of juvenile dryptosaurs while others belong to various undescribed species of ornithomimids. As of 2019, no distinct species of ornithomimosaurs have been identified yet, mostly due to the fact that no complete skeleton has been unearthed yet. However, it can be assumed that most of them were around the same size as their Laramidian relatives, though there is one specimen that could have reached a large size similar to Gallimimus or Beishanlong. In 2022, fossils from the Eutaw Formation from Mississippi revealed that large ornithomimids did indeed roam Appalachia.

==== Other theropods ====
Fossils from the Woodbine Formation in Texas, one of the few fossil sites that is one of Appalachia's more well preserved fossils, reveal that other theropods might have roamed Appalachia around the time when the Western Interior Seaway first formed, they include possible specimens of allosauroids, troodontids, caenagnathids, dromaeosaurs, and tyrannosaurs. The most of these being the carcharodontosaurid Acrocanthosaurus.

==== Hadrosaurs ====
Another common group, arguably the most widespread species in the area, of Appalachian dinosaurs were the hadrosaurs which were represented by three groups including Hadrosauromorpha, Hadrosauroidea, and the Hadrosauridae which is now considered to be their "ancestral homeland"; eventually making their way to Laramidia, Asia, Europe, South America and Antarctica where they diversified into the lambeosaurine and saurolophine dinosaurs, though some of the primitive hadrosaurs were still present until the end of the Mesozoic. While the fossil record shows a staggering variety of hadrosaur forms in Laramidia, hadrosaur remains for Appalachia show less diversity due to the relative uncommon number of fossil beds.

However, a decent number of hadrosaurs are known from Appalachia with Protohadros, Claosaurus, and Lophorhothon representing Hadrosauromorpha, Hypsibema crassicauda and Hypsibema missouriensis representing Hadrosauroidea, and Hadrosaurus and Eotrachodon representing Hadrosauridae. These hadrosaurs from Appalachia seem to be closely related to the crestless hadrosaurs of Laramidia like Gryposaurus and Edmontosaurus, despite the fact that they are not considered to be saurolophines. Claosaurus is known from a specimen which floated into the Interior Seaway and was found in Kansas, might also be from Appalachia, since it was found closer to the Appalachia side of the seaway and is unknown from Western North America. Hadrosaur remains have even been found in Iowa, though in fragmentary remains, Tennessee, most notably from the Coon Creek Formation.

Hypsibema crassicauda, over fifty feet long, was one of the largest eastern hadrosaurs, outgrowing some of more derived western hadrosaurs like Lambeosaurus and Saurolophus. The genus likely took up the environmental niche occupied by large sauropods in other areas, possibly grown to colossal sizes to that of Magnapaulia and Shantungosaurus. Hypsibema missouriensis, was another large species of hadrosaur, but it grew up to 45 to 49 feet, which wasn't as large as Hypsibema crassicauda. When it was first discovered in 1945, it was mistaken for a species of sauropod. Hypsibema missouriensis, possibly even all of the other hadrosaurs living on Appalachia, had serrated teeth for chewing the vegetation in the area. Hadrosaur fossils from the Kanguk Formation in Axel Heiberg Island in Nunavut, Canada show that hadrosaurs were rather widespread throughout Appalachia. The fossils found in the Kanguk Formation also revealed the dietary preferences of hadrosaurs, which revealed that they had a diet of conifers, stems, twigs, and various deciduous plants.

In 2020, the remains of one small-bodied hadrosaur and two small-bodied hadrosauromorphs were unearthed in the New Egypt Formation in New Jersey. The fossils were dated to the Maastrichtian, which was the last stage of the Cretaceous period that ended with the extinction the dinosaurs. This information would imply that Appalachia probably had a rich diversity of life, but research will be need in order to get a better picture of this lost world. In 2021, new remains of Hypsibema missouriensis, also known as Parrosaurus missouriensis, were unearthed in Missouri.

==== Lambeosaurs ====
Indeterminate lambeosaurinae remains, mostly similar to Corythosaurus, have been reported from New Jersey's Navesink Formation, Bylot Island and Nova Scotia, Canada. It cannot yet be explained how lambeosaurines might have reached Appalachia though some have theorized that a land bridge must have formed sometime during the Campanian. In 2020, a forelimb belonging to a lambeosaur was unearthed in the New Egypt Formation from New Jersey with evidence of sharks scavenging on its remains.

==== Ornithopods ====
While ornithopod fossils have been unearthed in the eastern United States in the past, including footprints in Virginia, they primarily belonged to scrappy remains and couldn't be described as distinct species, with the exception being Tenontosaurus. However, this all changed with the descriptions of Convolosaurus and Ampelognathus from early Cretaceous and late Cretaceous Texas, respectively.

==== Nodosaurs ====
The nodosaurids, a group of large, herbivorous armored dinosaurs resembling armadillos, are another testament to Appalachia's difference from Laramidia. During the early Cretaceous, the nodosaurids prospered and were one of the most widespread dinosaurs throughout North America. However, by the latest Cretaceous, nodosaurids were scarce in western North America, limited to forms like Edmontonia, Denversaurus and Panoplosaurus; perhaps due to competition from the ankylosauridae; though they did thrive in isolation, most notably in Appalachia, as mentioned earlier and in the case of Struthiosaurus, Europe as well. Nodosaurid scutes have been commonly found in eastern North America, while fossil specimens are very rare. Often the findings are not diagnostic enough to identify the species, but the remains attest to a greater number of these armored dinosaurs in Appalachia.

Multiple specimens have been unearthed in Kansas in the Niobrara Formation, Alabama in Ripley Formation, Mississippi, Delaware, Maryland and New Jersey, possibly belonging to a multitude of different species. Five possible and best-known examples of Appalachian nodosaurids, from both the early and late Cretaceous period, include Priconodon, Propanoplosaurus, Niobrarasaurus, Silvisaurus and possibly Hierosaurus, though its validity is disputed. Just like the Claosaurus specimen, it is possible that the specimens of Niobrarasaurus, Silvisaurus and Hierosaurus floated into the Interior Seaway from the east, since these two species of nodosaurids were discovered in the famous chalk formations of Kansas and are not known from any location from Western North America. Kansas was also a part of Appalachia when the other parts were covered by oceans, which were a part of the Western Interior Seaway.

==== Ceratopsians ====
While remains of the advanced ceratopsians, most notably the centrosaurines and chasmosaurines which were very common in Laramidia during this time period, they were long thought to be nonpresent in Appalachia, however this notion changed in 2016 when a ceratopsian tooth was unearthed in Mississippi's Owl Creek Formation, which has been dated to be 67 million years old. The owner of this one particular tooth was probably a chasmosaurine since by the end of the Cretaceous while the centrosaurines had completely vanished from most of North America, though they were thriving in Asia as in the case of Sinoceratops, and most likely entered Appalachia as soon as the Western Interior Seaway closed.

==== Leptoceratopsians ====
Just like their larger cousins, the leptoceratopsids were thought to be absent from Appalachia until the mid-2010s when a jaw bone of an indeterminate genus was unearthed in North Carolina. A Campanian-era leptoceratopsid ceratopsian has been found in the Tar Heel Formation, marking the first discovery of a ceratopsian dinosaur in the Appalachian zone. This specimen bears a uniquely long, slender and downcurved upper jaw, suggesting that it was an animal with a specialized feeding strategy, yet another example of speciation on an island environment. While leptoceratopsid remains, the few that have been discovered in recent years have been unearthed in the southern part of Appalachia. They appear to be completely absent from the northern part of Appalachia, states like New Jersey, Delaware, and Maryland, suggesting the idea, proposed by paleontologist David R. Schwimmer, that there was a possible providence during the Late Cretaceous (although it may be a case of preservation bias). It is not completely understood how the leptoceratopsians were able to reach Appalachia; however, the most commonly accepted theory was that they island hopped from Europe during the time that the Western Interior Seaway split the North American continent into two different land masses in a way that some species of leptoceratopsids, most notably Ajkaceratops, were able to reach Europe. It should also be noted that there is a distinct difference with how the leptoceratopsians evolved in Appalachia and Laramida. The Appalachian leptoceratopsian that was unearthed in the Tar Heel Formation, which grew to the size of a large dog, had a more slender jaw that teeth that curved downward and outward in its beak. This would imply a specialized feeding strategy for feeding on the foliage that was native to Appalachia during the Campanian.

==== Birds ====
Several bird remains are known from Appalachian sites, most of them sea birds like hesperornithes like Hesperornis, Canadaga, Baptornis, Fumicollis, Parahesperornis, and Ichthyornis, enantiornithes like Halimornis and ornithurans like Apatornis and Iaceornis, possibly indicating that Appalachia may have possessed a diverse variety of birds that were endemic to the region. Of particular interest are possible lithornithid remains in New Jersey, arguably one of the best records for Cretaceous birds as some specimens were preserved in the greensands in the area, which would represent a clear example of palaeognath Neornithes in the Late Cretaceous. However, this issue is still under debate. Examples of birds that were endemic to Appalachia include a few groups such as the charadriiformes, which consisted of Graculavus and Telmatornis, anseriformes as represented by Anatalavis, procellariiformes with Tytthostonyx being a representative of the group, and Palaeotringa and Laornis belonging to a currently unknown group of birds. Hesperornithid fossils have also been unearthed in Arkansas. Some birds found in Canada such as Tingmiatornis and Canadaga were found in areas that were a part of Appalachia. Enantiornithine birds are also known from Appalachia, as is the case of Flexomornis from the Woodbine Formation from Texas.

=== Non-dinosaur herpetofauna ===
==== Amphibians ====
Through the Ellisdale Fossil Site, a good picture of Appalachia's amphibian fauna is present. Amidst lissamphibians, there is evidence for sirenids (including the large Habrosaurus), the batrachosauroidid salamander Parrisia, hylids, and possible representatives of Eopelobates and Discoglossus. These show close similarities to European faunas, but aside from Habrosaurus (which is also found on Laramidia) there is a high degree of endemism, suggesting no interchanges with other landmasses throughout the Late Cretaceous.

==== Lizards ====
There is also a high degree of endemism in regards to its reptilian fauna: among squamates, the teiid Prototeius is exclusive to the landmass, and native representatives of iguanids, helodermatids, and necrosaurids are also known.

==== Snakes ====
Fossilized remains of snakes are rare in Appalachia and much more common in Laramidia most likely due to preservation bias. However, in the late 1980s, fossil remains of a Cretaceous era snake, attributed to Coniophis, were unearthed in North Carolina.

==== Turtles ====
Amidst turtles, which are rather common finds in Appalachia, Adocus, Bothremys and Chedighaii are well represented, the latter two in particular more common in Appalachian sites than Laramidian ones. Pleurochayah, a bothremyid, is known from Texas. In Santonian Alabama occurred the giant endemic Appalachemys. Two marine stem group-trionychians, "Trionyx" priscus and "Trionyx" halophilus, are known from the eastern coastal margin of Appalachia (New Jersey, Delaware, Maryland and the Carolinas).

==== Crocodiles ====
Crocodiles were rather abundant in Appalachia with nine local crocodilian genera belonging to several confirmed families, with the possibility of much more undiscovered crocodiles waiting to be unearthed. Goniopholididae is represented by Dakotasuchus and Woodbinesuchus, Alligatoridae is represented by Bottosaurus, Neosuchia is represented by Scolomastax and Deltasuchus, Alligatoroidea are presented Deinosuchus and Leidyosuchus, Gavialoidea are represented by Thoracosaurus, Eothoracosaurus, and Crocodilia is presented by Borealosuchus, are well established in Laramidia as well, probably indicative of their ocean crossing capacities. Deinosuchus, being one of the largest crocodilians of the fossil record, was an apex predator that did prey on the dinosaurs in the area, the same case applies for Laramidia as well, despite the fact that the majority of its diet consisted of turtles and sea turtles. However, crocodiles still preyed on the endemic dinosaurs whenever they got the chance to do so; there is evidence of crocodile bite marks on the femur of large ornithomimosaur that indicates the predatory behavior of native crocodiles. Fossils unearthed in South Carolina and New Jersey shows that some of the crocodilians endemic to Appalachia survived the extinction of the dinosaurs and even persisted into the Cenozoic.

==== Dyrosauridae ====
Dyrosauridae, most notably Dyrosaurus and Hyposaurus fossils, are also known form Appalachia, particularly in New Jersey, Alabama, and South Carolina.

==== Pholidosauridae ====
Only one species of pholidosaurid is known to have lived in Appalachia; Terminonaris whose remains have been unearthed in Texas. Kansas, and Minnesota.

==== Pterosaurs ====
Pterosaur fossils, mostly similar to Pteranodon and Nyctosaurus, have been unearthed in Georgia, Alabama and Delaware. On a similar note, azhdarchid remains, which belong to Arambourgiania, have been unearthed in Tennessee. Azhdarchid remains have also been unearthed in North Carolina. There have been a number of specimens of pterosaurs unearthed in areas that were a part of Appalachia during the time that the Western Interior Seaway had divided North America into two landmasses. Fossils of Appalachian pterosaurs have also been unearthed in Kansas and Texas. Pteranodontidae seems to be the most common group of pterosaurs in Appalachia and is represented by five species: Pteranodon, Nyctosaurus, Geosternbergia, Dawndraco, and Alamodactylus. Members of the Ornithocheiridae and Anhangueridae are represented by Aetodactylus and Cimoliopterus respectively.

==== Choristodera ====
The remains of indeterminate choristoderans have turned up in the Navesink Formation; the only known genus of choristodere during the Late Cretaceous was Champsosaurus. As a whole Appalachian choristodere fossils are very rare, speculated to the result of the lack of a suitable cold freshwater environment as seen in Laramidia at similar latitudes; the animals are speculated to have been more common at higher latitudes and altitudes.

==== Mammals ====
Several types of mammals are also present in Ellisdale and in both of the Carolinas. The most common are ptilodontoidean multituberculates, such as Mesodma, Cimolodon and a massively-sized species. The sheer diversity of species on the landmass, as well as the earlier appearance compared to other Late Cretaceous locales, suggests that ptilodontoideans evolved in Appalachia. Metatherians are also known, including an alphadontid, a stagodontid, and a herpetotheriid. Unlike ptilodontoideans, metatherians show a lesser degree of endemism, implying a degree of interchange with Laramidia and Europe. Research in this area has revealed that the Taeniolabidoidea mammals can trace their origins here and that there were several species of multituberculates endemic to Appalachia. Eutheria fossils, most notably molars, have also been unearthed in Mississippi. It is possible that they belong to a creature rather reminiscent to Protungulatum. The genus Alphadon as well as members of the Allotheria family have had their remains unearthed in New Jersey.

==== Marine life ====
While not much was known about Appalachia's land-based fauna until recently, the marine life that in the area, as well as the life that lived in the nearby Western Interior Seaway, has been well studied by paleontologists for years. Such examples of fossil sites that have preserved the remains of marine life from that period include the Niobrara Formation, the Demopolis Chalk Formation, and the Mooreville Chalk Formation are just a few examples of the fossil sites that have successfully preserved the skeletal remains of various marine creatures from the Cretaceous. Examples of the marine fauna that lived near Appalachia include chondrichthyes, osteichthyes, chelonioids, plesiosaurs, and mosasaurs, which were the apex predators of their environment at the time.

Plesiosaur fossils, belonging to the genus Cimoliasaurus, have been unearthed in New Jersey. Mosasaur remains have also been unearthed in Missouri.

Fish fossils are rather common throughout Appalachia, especially in locations abundant in marl, shale, and limestone. Fish fossils, as well as a lot of Cretaceous era marine fauna, are rather abundant in regions like the Niobrara Formation in Kansas, which is made up of shale, sandstone and limestone, as well as the Woodbury Formation in New Jersey.

==== Arthropods ====
Many species of arthropods are known from the Turonian aged New Jersey amber, situated on the Atlantic coast of Appalachia. Arthropods are also known from the Cenomanian aged Redmond Formation of Labrador, Canada.

== Flora ==
While the fossil sites from the southern part in Appalachia, places like Alabama and the Carolinas, have a very scant amount of Cretaceous plant fossils with the exception of Georgia, the northern parts of Appalachia, such as New Jersey, Maryland, and Delaware have a much better record in terms of plant species being unearthed there, especially with fossils sites like the Ellisdale Fossil Site, and have given us a better glimpse of the world 100 million years ago. In the Ellisdae Fossil Site, excavations have revealed that plants like Picea, Metasequoia, Liriodendron, and possibly Rhizophora inhabited the region during the late Cretaceous period, implying that the environment during that time period was a coastal forest with a few types of marine environments as well including estuarine, lagoonal, marine, and terrestrial. Plant fossils found in neighboring states such as Delaware and Maryland have revealed that ferns, gymnosperms, and angiosperms did indeed inhabit the area.

Angiosperm fossils were unearthed in the Dakota Formation in Nebraska. As mentioned earlier, Georgia has a rich fossil record of plant life dating back to the Cretaceous. Some of the examples of flora that was present in that area include Salicaceae, Lauraceae, Sequoioideae, Moraceae, Pinophyta, Malpighiales, Monocotyledon, Ericaceae, Cinnamomum, Ranunculales, Salicaceae, Torreya, Cupressaceae, Magnoliaceae and Rhamnaceae. Plant fossils of Minnesota have revealed that cycads, evergreens, Equisetum, laurels, ferns, willows, redwoods, poplars, tulip trees, and pomegranates were present in the area during the Cretaceous. There is also a huge concentration of Normapolles unearthed in the southeastern United States, suggesting that there was a distinct phytogeography through the area during the Cretaceous.

Fossils unearthed near from the Redmond Formation in Labrador have revealed that many of the modern-day angiosperms first appeared in Appalachia. Plant fossils found in Crawford County, Georgia show a wide variety of plant diversity such as sporophytes, gametophytes, Detrusandra, Hamamelidaceae, Actinidiaceae, and a multitude of 63 species of plants have been unearthed in this region. Angiosperm plants have been found in the Woodbine Formation. Pinaceae and Lauraceae fossils have been unearthed in Mississippi and North Carolina respectively.

Plant fossils found in Massachusetts and Rhode Island indicate that the climate here was sub-humid and paratropical too, indicating that some of Appalachia's habitats largely consisted of coastal plains and deciduous forests. Plants of Pinaceae, Taxodioideae, Araucariaceae, Taxaceae, Cycas and Thallophyte have been found in Georgia and South Carolina.

== See also ==
- List of Appalachian dinosaurs
