= Williams Fork Formation =

Geological Formation in Colorado

- Stratigraphic range: Campanian (Edmontonian) ~73–70 Ma
- Type: Geological formation
- Unit of: Mesaverde Group

Lithology
- Primary: Mudstone
- Other: Sandstone

Location
- Coordinates: 40.0°N 108.8°W
- Approximate paleocoordinates: 47.5°N 80.3°W
- Region: Colorado
- Country: United States
- Williams Fork Formation (the United States) Williams Fork Formation (Colorado)

The Williams Fork Formation (WFF) is a geologic formation located in northwestern Colorado that is a member of the Mesaverde group. The formation was located on the eastern coast of Laramidia and was deposited by a fluvio-deltaic environment during the Campanian/Maastrichtian (Edmontonian) boundary.

== Geology ==
The Williams Fork Formation is located in Northwestern Colorado. It is a member of the Mesaverde group. The formation compared to similar formations of similar age on the Laramidian continent is understudied. The formations fluvial deposits include isolated and stacked point-bar deposits, crevasse splays and overbank/floodplain mudrock. It contains highly discontinuous fluvial sandstones, associated siltstones, shales and deposits of coal.

The formation is fossiliferous having yielded a diverse assemblage of thousands vertebrate fossils. The formations has an abundance of teeth fossils.

== Paleoenvironment ==
During the Late Cretaceous period (at the boundary of the Campanian and Maastrichtian), North America was divided into two continents, Laramidia and Appalachia, by a seaway called the Western Interior Seaway. The Williams Fork Formation was located on the eastern coast of Laramidia.

== Fauna ==
This formation is very fossiliferous with many different species that have been discovered. It supported a diverse group of vertebrates that included fish, lissamphibians, squamates, turtles, eusuchians, dinosaurs, mammals, insect feeding traces on leaves, freshwater mollusks, etc.

=== Reptiles ===
Reptiles in the Williams Forks Formation are abundant. Squamates like the genus Peneteius lived here.

==== Dinosaurs ====
Many groups of dinosaurs have been discovered here including tyrannosaurids, dromaeosaurids, troodontids, nodosaurids, ankylosaurids, and hadrosaurids. Pentaceratops sternbergii is one of the most notable dinosaurs found at this formation. Intermediate fossils of Dromeosaurs such as Richardoestesia has been discovered.

==== Crocodylomorphs ====
The teeth of Alligatoroids are relatively common and are extremely similar to Brachychampsa which lived at the same time. Though they are considered intermediate in general features.

=== Mammals ===
The formation contains several Metathrian mammals like Heleocola and Glasbius. Isolated teeth remains show that Multituberculate mammals existed to with genera like Meniscoessus.

=== Fish ===
The freshwater biota of the Williams Fork formation is dominated by Actinopterygian fishes. These fishes include Holosteans such as Atractosteus, amiids such as Melvius, Cyclurus and Palaeolabrus. Chondrosteans are only represented tentatively by a acipenserid. This formation also has many Teleosteomorphs like Belonostomus, Paralbula casei, Coriops, Estesesox foxi, Acronichthys, hiodontids, and acanthomorphs. There have also been fragmentary remains of what may be a pycnodontiform. The teeth of lungfish have been found.

Chondrichthyans in the formation rare but does include hybodontids like Lonchidion and hemiscyllids like Chiloscyllium. Cantioscyllium was also discovered here. Rays like Cristomylus and Psuedomyledaphus have been reported.

=== Invertebrates ===
Ammonites such as the genus Lewyites were found in the formation.

== See also ==
- List of dinosaur-bearing rock formations
  - List of stratigraphic units with indeterminate dinosaur fossils
