= Hudson Seaway =

Major seaway of North America during the Cretaceous Period

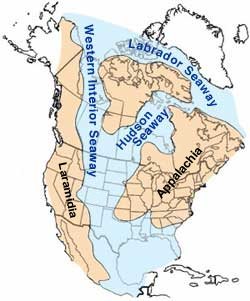
Hudson Seaway

The Hudson Seaway was a major seaway of North America during the Cretaceous Period some 75 million years ago. It is named after the Hudson Bay, which currently occupies much of its extent. Although not as extensive as the Western Interior Seaway, which divided North America into eastern and western landmasses (Appalachia and Laramidia, respectively), the Hudson Seaway had major impacts on climate and migration routes by dividing the eastern half of the continent into two (Appalachia and Hudsonia). Greenland was more permanently separated, by the foundered rift that created the Labrador Seaway.

== See also ==
- Lake Agassiz – Large lake in central North America at the end of the last glacial period
