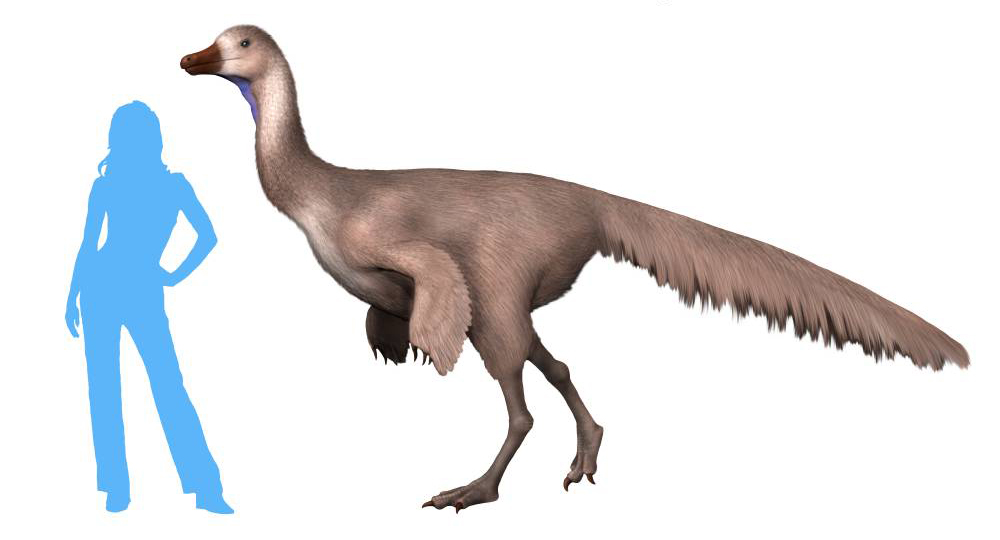
- Life restoration of Arkansaurus fridayi

Scientific classification
- Kingdom: Animalia
- Phylum: Chordata
- Class: Reptilia
- Clade: Dinosauria
- Clade: Saurischia
- Clade: Theropoda
- Clade: †Ornithomimosauria
- Genus: †Arkansaurus; Hunt & Quinn, 2018
- Species: †A. fridayi

Binomial name
- †Arkansaurus fridayi Hunt & Quinn, 2018

= Arkansaurus =

Arkansaurus Temporal range: Early Cretaceous, Aptian–Albian

Extinct genus of dinosaurs

Arkansaurus (meaning "Arkansas lizard") is an extinct genus of ornithomimosaurian theropod dinosaur that lived during the Aptian and Albian stages of the Early Cretaceous in what is now North America. The type and only species is Arkansaurus fridayi.

== History ==
In August 1972, Joe B. Friday, who owned a service station in Lockesburg, Arkansas, noticed some vultures circling above his land. Checking his cows, he noticed that fossil bones were visible in a ditch near the road where some gravel had been removed recently for the reconstruction of Arkansas Highway 24. He removed them and for some months displayed the fossils in his station. At the time, nobody recognised them for dinosaur bones. A geology professor at the University of Arkansas and former resident of the nearby town of Nashville, Doy Zachry Jr., took the bones to his colleague at the University of Arkansas, paleontologist Dr. James H. Quinn, to view. Quinn recognized the fossilized remains as dinosaurian and prepared the bones. He took the remains to the annual meeting of the Society of Vertebrate Paleontology in Lincoln, Nebraska in the fall of 1972. Once there, the bones were examined by experts from both the US and Europe. They were thought to be related to Ornithomimus. Quinn first presented on the fossils in 1973 at the Geological Society of America Meeting in Little Rock, Arkansas.

In March 1973, Dr. James Harrison Quinn and Benjamin Clardy of the Arkansas Geological Commission went to the area on the Friday farm where the remains had been discovered, hoping to find more remains. The site was a pit that had been dug for road construction and the fossils had been taken from the Early Cretaceous Trinity Group. Unfortunately, all the scientists were able to find was a toe bone. They speculated that the bones had either been scattered when they were buried or during the road construction. In all there were three metatarsals, four phalanges, and three claws found of Arkansaurus.

Four casts of the bones were made. These casts were given to the Friday Family, the University of Arkansas, the Arkansas Geological Commission, and the Arkansas Museum of Science and Natural History. The University cast is hanging in a classroom in Ozark Hall. The Museum of Science and Natural History actually had a large statue of the dinosaur constructed to go along with their cast, and it was on display for many years when the museum was located at the Tower Building. The original bones, donated to the university by Friday, currently reside at the University of Arkansas Museum Collections, now housed at the Arkansas Archaeological Survey in Fayetteville, Arkansas.

Quinn intended to name the species "Arkansaurus fridayi" but in 1977 made a fatal fall when prospecting for fossils in Nebraska. The name Arkansaurus first appeared in print in a popular-science book by Helen Roney Sattler in 1983, remaining an invalid nomen nudum. The full species name was first published by Angela K. Braden in 1998, mentioning that Quinn had informally used the combination "Arkansaurus fridayi".

In January 2017 Rep. Greg Leding, D-Fayetteville, submitted a bill to the Arkansas Legislature to designate Arkansaurus the State Dinosaur, along with several cosigners. The original idea of the bill came from high school student Mason Cypress Oury, who, accompanied by Rep. Leding, presented a modified version of the bill to a House panel, and answered questions. Among his reasoning for adopting the Arkansaurus as the state dinosaur Oury pointed out that Oklahoma, Texas and Missouri all have listed state dinosaurs, and Arkansas already has 24 designated state symbols, and since it was the 25th state to be admitted to the union, it made sense to add one more. The bill was approved by the governor February 17, 2017.

Arkansaurus was declared the official Arkansas state dinosaur in 2017. The dinosaur was discovered in Lockesburg, Arkansas, and was a bipedal ornithomimosaur dinosaur. A near relative is the ornithomimosaur Nedcolbertia. It is named for the state of Arkansas and its discoverer Joe B. Friday, who found the dinosaur's fossilized foot on his land in 1972. It is the only dinosaur fossil currently described from Arkansas. The fossil was officially described in 2018 by paleontologists ReBecca Hunt-Foster and James Harrison Quinn in the Journal of Vertebrate Paleontology.

The official description of this dinosaur was published on March 19, 2018 in the Journal of Vertebrate Paleontology by paleontologists ReBecca Hunt-Foster and, posthumously, James H. Quinn. The study determined that the fossils contain a combination of unique anatomical details, such as differentiated pedal unguals, a laterally compressed third metatarsal that is ovoid in proximal view, and a distal ungual with a very weak flexor tubercle, lacking spurs. The condition of this third metatarsal suggests that Arkansaurus fridayi is more basal than Asiatic ornithomimosaurs of similar age, but consistent with older North American forms, such as Nedcolbertia.

== Description ==
Arkansaurus measured about 4.6 metres (15 ft) long and weighed about 380.5 kilograms (839 lb). Examination of the holotype consisting of a nearly complete right foot suggests that Arkansaurus was similar to most ornithomimosaurians of the Early Cretaceous, with the strong curvature of the foot claws being the only exception: most ornithomimosaurians had flat claws. The holotype also revealed a greenstick fracture, which is the first record among dinosaur fossils, and a potential gout.

== Phylogeny ==
Arkansaurus was placed in the Ornithomimosauria in a basal position, outside of the Ornithomimidae.

== Paleobiology ==
Ornithomimosaur tracks of similar age are known from north of Moab, Utah, at the Mill Canyon Dinosaur Tracksite, in the Ruby Ranch Member of the Cedar Mountain Formation (Early Cretaceous). This tracksite also preserves the tracks of ankylosaur, hadrosaur, sauropod and several size classes of theropod dinosaurs, along with crocodiles and birds. A similar fauna has been noted from the Trinity Group in Arkansas.

== See also ==
- List of U.S. state dinosaurs
- 2018 in paleontology
- Timeline of ornithomimosaur research
