= Western Interior Seaway =

Prehistoric inland sea that split the continent of North America

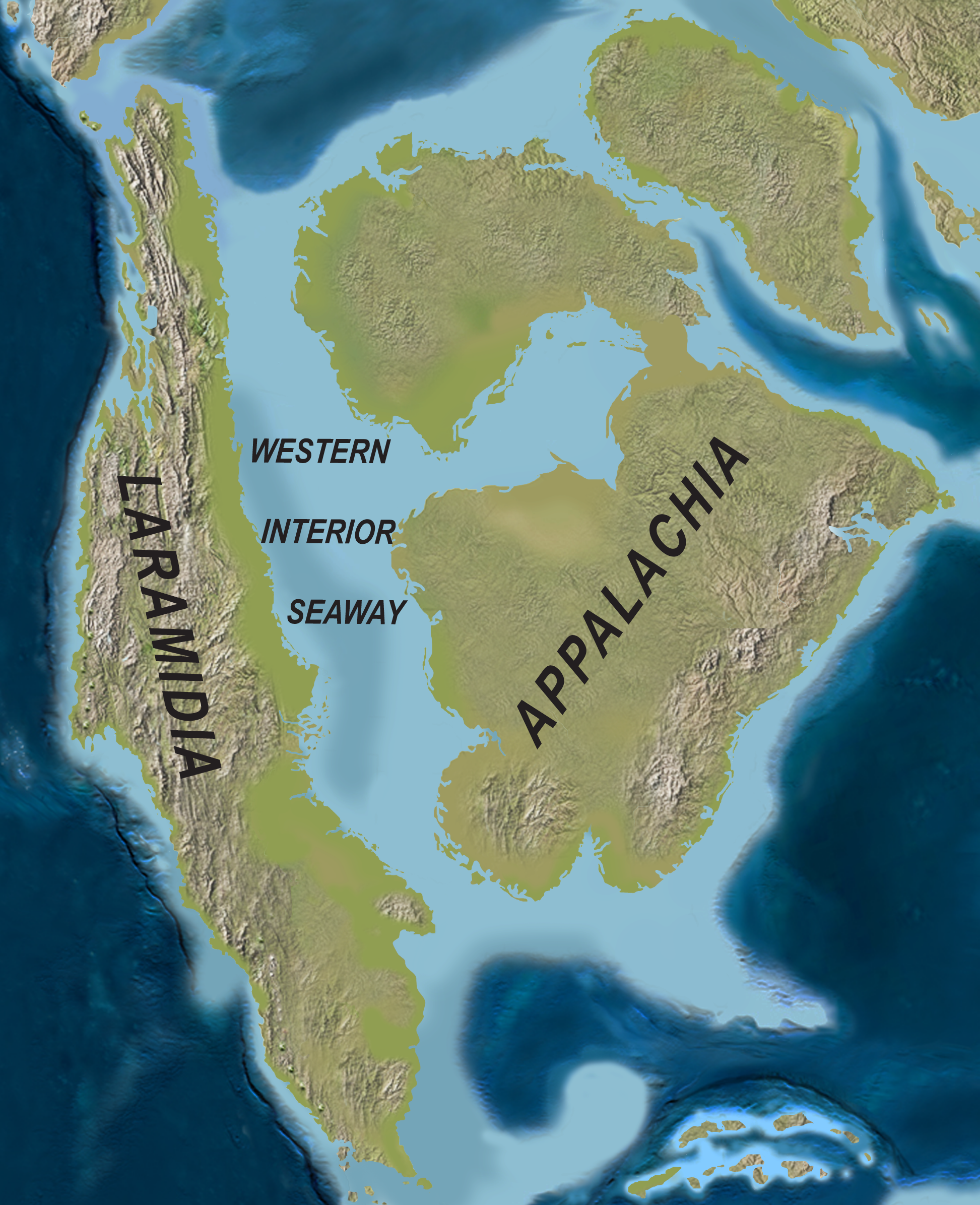
The map of North America with the Western Interior Seaway during the Campanian

The Western Interior Seaway (also called the Cretaceous Seaway, the Niobraran Sea, the North American Inland Sea, or the Western Interior Sea) was a large inland sea that existed roughly over the present-day Great Plains of North America, splitting the continent into two major landmasses, Laramidia to the west and Appalachia to the east, as well as Hudsonia to the north east. The ancient sea, which existed for 34 million years from the early Late Cretaceous (100 Ma) to the earliest Paleocene (66 Ma), connected the Gulf of Mexico (then a marginal sea of the Central American Seaway) to the Arctic Ocean. At its largest extent, the seaway was 760 m (2,500 ft) deep, 970 km (600 mi) wide and over 3,200 km (2,000 mi) long.

== Origin and geology ==
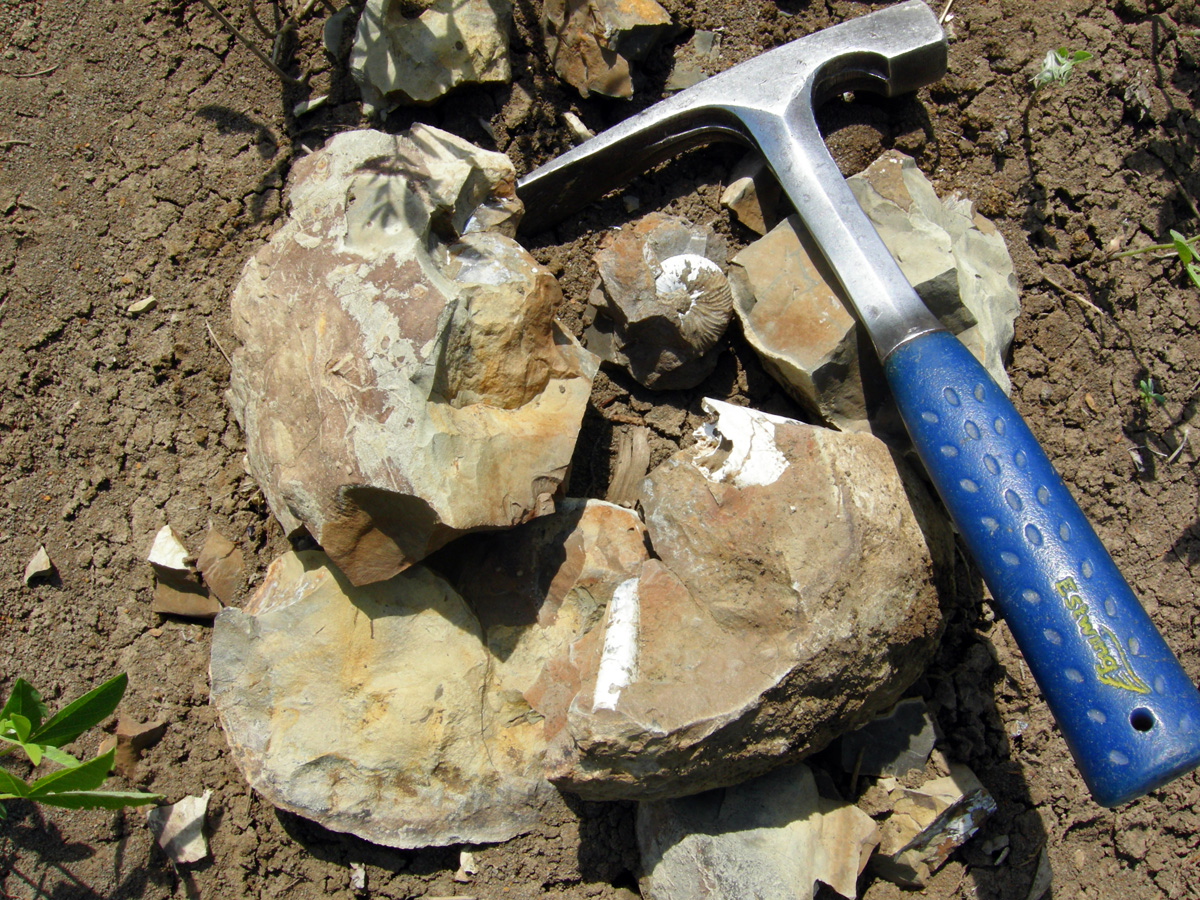
A broken concretion with fossils inside; late Cretaceous Pierre Shale near Ekalaka, Montana.

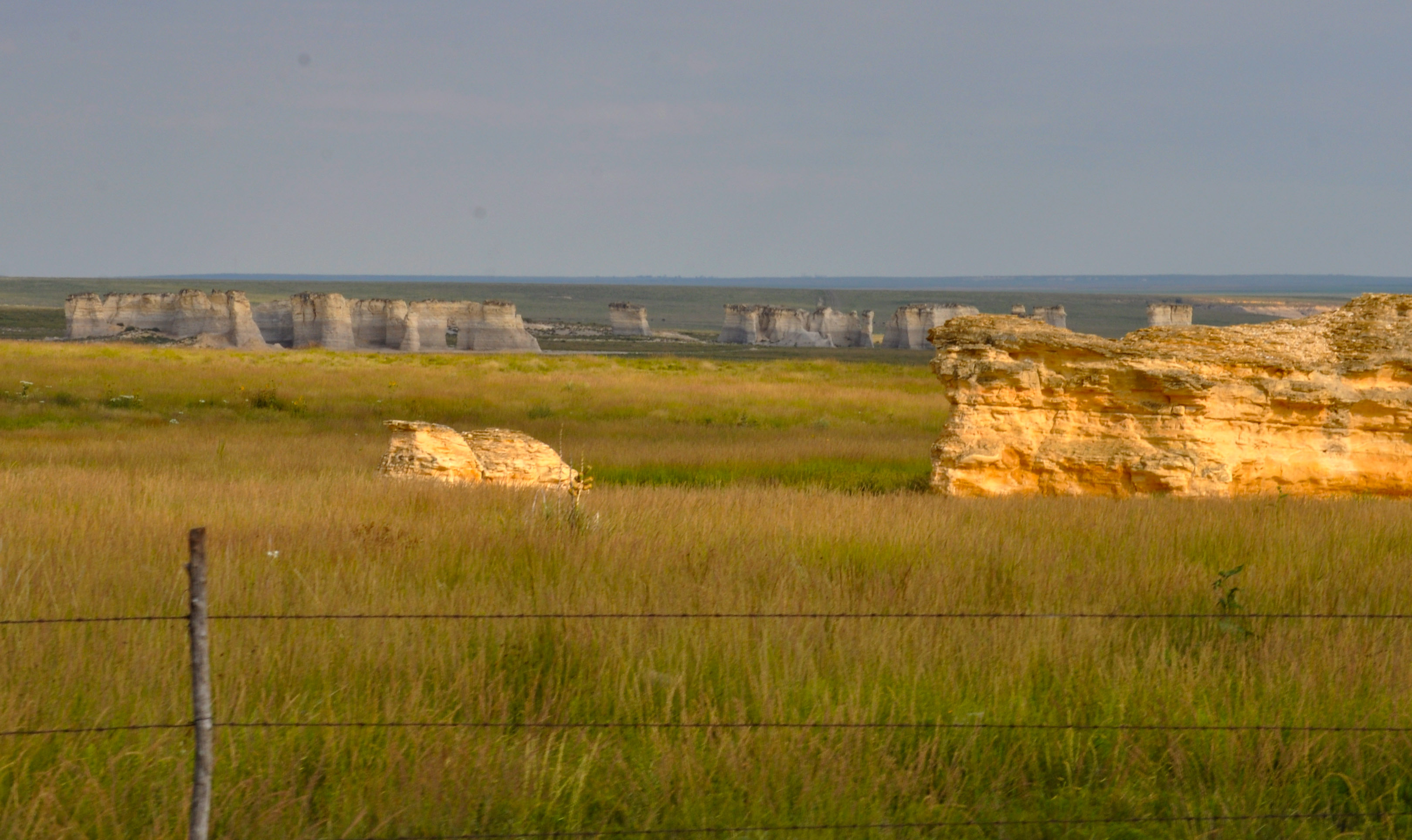
Monument Rocks (Kansas), located 25 miles south of Oakley.

By the late Cretaceous, Eurasia and the Americas had separated along the south Atlantic, and subduction on the west coast of the Americas had commenced, resulting in the Laramide orogeny, the early phase of growth of the modern Rocky Mountains. The Western Interior Seaway may be seen as a downwarping of the continental crust ahead of the growing Laramide/Rockies mountain chain.

The earliest phase of the seaway began in the mid-Cretaceous when an arm of the Arctic Ocean transgressed south over western North America; this formed the Mowry Sea, so named for the Mowry Shale, an organic-rich rock formation. In the south, the Gulf of Mexico was originally an extension of the Tethys Ocean. In time, the southern embayment merged with the Mowry Sea in the late Cretaceous, forming a completed seaway, creating isolated environments for land animals and plants.

Relative sea levels fell multiple times, as a margin of land temporarily rose above the water along the ancestral Transcontinental Arch, each time rejoining the separated, divergent land populations, allowing a temporary mixing of newer species before again separating the populations.

At its largest, the Western Interior Seaway stretched from the Rockies east to the Appalachian Mountains, some 1,000 km (620 mi) wide. At its deepest, it may have been only 800 or 900 metres (2,600 or 3,000 ft) deep, shallow in terms of seas. Two great continental watersheds drained into it from east and west, diluting its waters and bringing resources in eroded silt that formed shifting delta systems along its low-lying coasts. There was little sedimentation on the eastern shores of the seaway; the western boundary, however, consisted of a thick clastic wedge eroded eastward from the Sevier orogenic belt. The western shore was thus highly variable, depending on variations in sea level and sediment supply. Biostratigraphy suggests that average sea surface temperatures around this time (the Turonian) were about 32 °C (90 °F) (foraminiferal records), and (based on ammonite-based biostratigraphy) could debatably reach as high as 44 °C (111 °F).

Widespread carbonate deposition suggests that the seaway was warm and tropical, with abundant calcareous planktonic algae. Remnants of these deposits are found in northwest Kansas. A prominent example is Monument Rocks, an exposed chalk formation towering 21 metres (70 ft) over the surrounding range land. The Western Interior Seaway is believed to have behaved similarly to a giant estuary in terms of water mass transport. Riverine inputs exited the seaway as coastal jets, while correspondingly drawing in water from the Tethys in the south and Boreal waters from the north. During the late Cretaceous, the Western Interior Seaway went through multiple periods of anoxia, when the bottom water was devoid of oxygen and the water column was stratified.

At the end of the Cretaceous, continued Laramide uplift hoisted the sandbanks (sandstone) and muddy brackish lagoons (shale), thick sequences of silt and sandstone still seen today as the Laramie Formation, while low-lying basins between them gradually subsided. The Western Interior Seaway divided across the Dakotas and retreated south towards the Gulf of Mexico. This shrunken and final regressive phase is sometimes called the Pierre Seaway. Well-preserved fossil otoliths of the marine catfish Vorhisia suggest that around this time, following a major cooling trend from the highs of the Cretaceous Thermal Maximum, average water temperatures in the Western Interior Seaway were about 18 °C (64 °F). Ammonite-based biostratigraphy suggests that the lowest average temperatures reached by the Western Interior Seaway were during the early Maastrichtian, about 16 °C (61 °F), with a slight warming towards the end of the Maastrichtian to 22 °C (72 °F).

During the early Paleocene, parts of the Western Interior Seaway still occupied areas of the Mississippi Embayment, submerging the site of present-day Memphis. Later transgression, however, was associated with the Cenozoic Tejas sequence, rather than with the previous event responsible for the seaway.

== Phases ==
The Western Interior Seaway experienced multiple sequences of transgression and regression as the sea level rose and lowered, respectively. Over at least the last 20 million years of the Cretaceous, the seaway generally regressed, but periods of transgression over time have been given different names relative to their cyclothem. The Niobrara sea was formed by the first sea level rise expanding the seaway westward, which then regressed through the Aquilian land-vertebrate age. Following this, the sea level rose again in the "Claggett transgression", named for the Claggett Shale, before regressing again in the Judithian. The sea level then rose again to form the shallow Bearpaw Sea of the "Bearpaw transgression" (named after the Bearpaw Shale), which expanded over much of Wyoming, Montana, and the prairie provinces, before regressing in the Edmontonian. Following this was a localized "Lewis" sea separated from the Bearpaw Sea to the north, before more regression of the Western Interior Seaway.

== Fauna ==
The Western Interior Seaway was a shallow sea with abundant marine life. Vertebrate denizens included predatory marine reptiles such as plesiosaurs, mosasaurs and Deinosuchus. Other marine life included sharks such as Squalicorax, Cretoxyrhina and the giant durophagous Ptychodus mortoni (believed to be 10 m or 33 ft long); and advanced ray-finned fish including Pachyrhizodus, Enchodus and the massive 4-to-5-metre (13 to 16 ft) long Xiphactinus, larger than any modern bony fish. Other invertebrate sea life included bivalves, ammonites, squid-like belemnites and plankton including coccolithophores (which secreted the chalky platelets that give the Cretaceous its name), foraminiferans and radiolarians.

The seaway was home to early birds, including the flightless Hesperornis that had stout legs for swimming through water and tiny wings used for marine steering rather than flight; and the tern-like Ichthyornis, an early avian with a toothy beak. Ichthyornis shared the sky with large pterosaurs, such as Nyctosaurus and Pteranodon. Pteranodon fossils are very common; it was probably a major participant in the surface ecosystem, though it was found in only the southern reaches of the seaway.

Inoceramids (oyster-like bivalve molluscs) were well-adapted to life in the oxygen-poor bottom mud of the seaway. These left abundant fossils in the Kiowa, Greenhorn, Niobrara, Mancos, and Pierre formations. There is great variety in the shells and the many distinct species have been dated and can be used to identify specific beds in those rock formations of the seaway. Many species can easily fit in the palm of the hand, while some, like Inoceramus (Haploscapha) grandis, could be well over a meter in diameter. Entire schools of fish sometimes sought shelter within the shell of the giant Platyceramus. The shells of the genus are known for being composed of prismatic calcitic crystals that grew perpendicular to the surface, and fossils often retain a pearly luster.

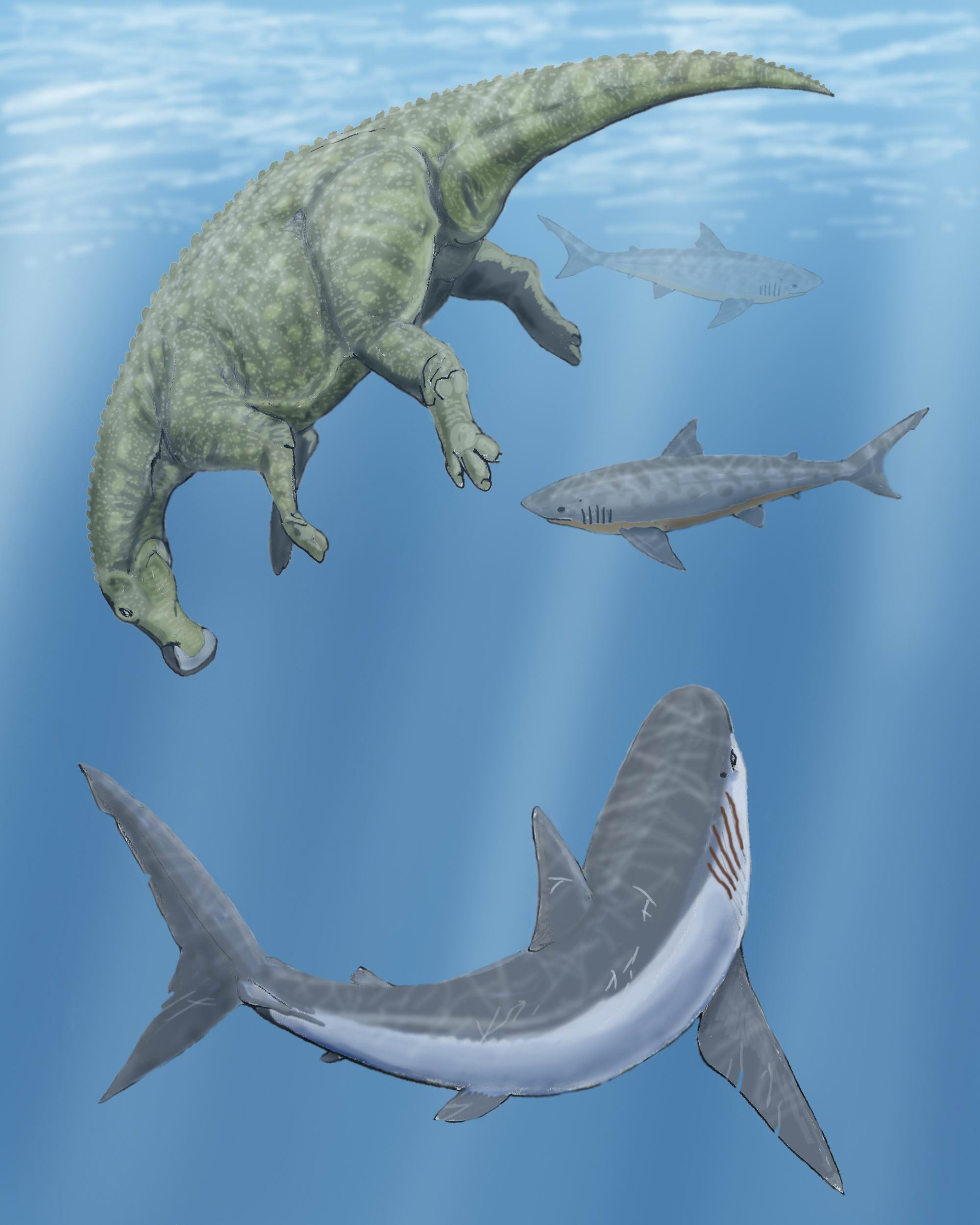
Artist's impression of a Cretoxyrhina and two Squalicorax circling a dead Claosaurus in the Western Interior Seaway

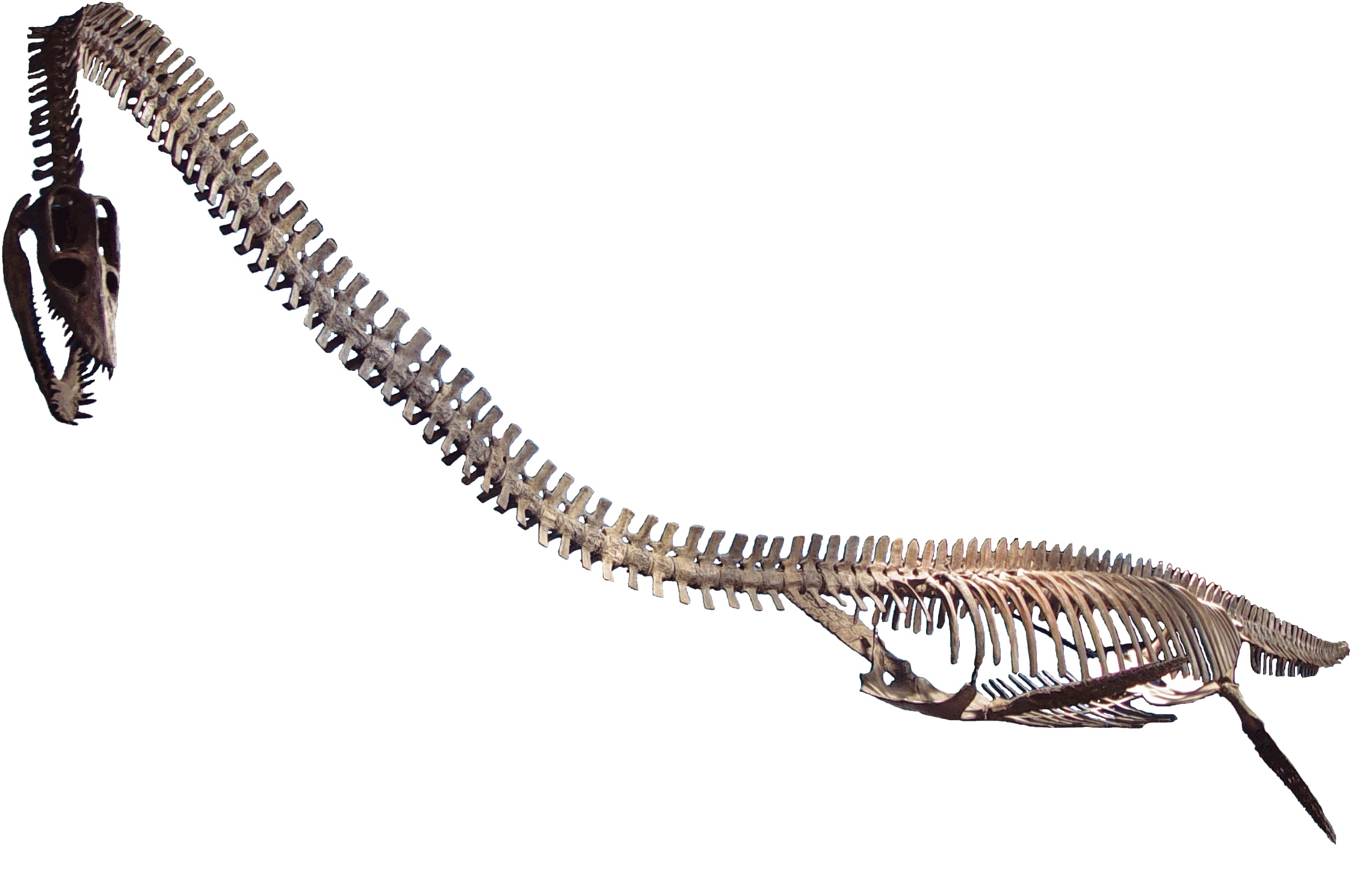
Elasmosaurus platyurus in the Rocky Mountain Dinosaur Resource Center in Woodland Park, Colorado

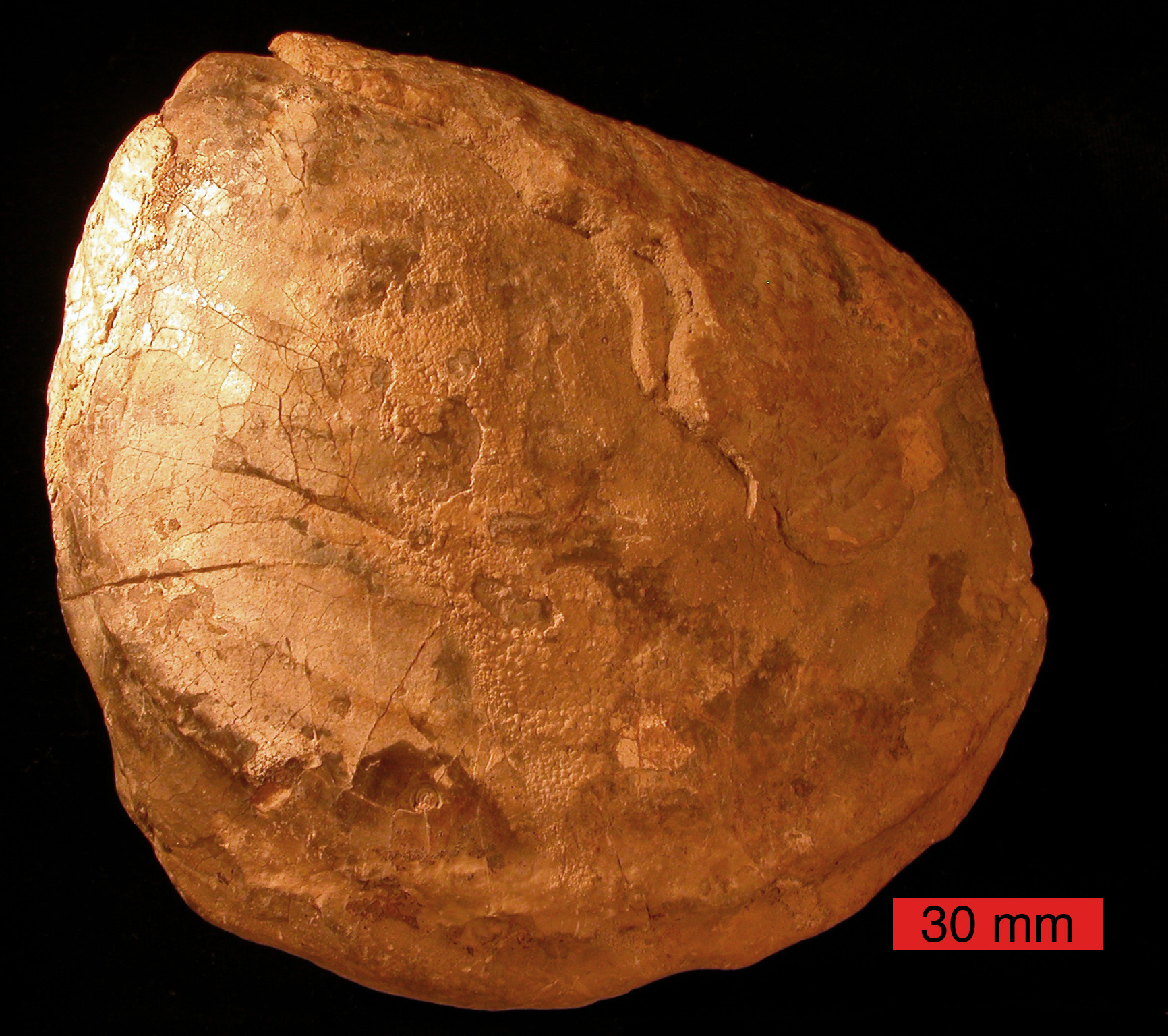
Inoceramus, an ancient bivalve from the Cretaceous of South Dakota.

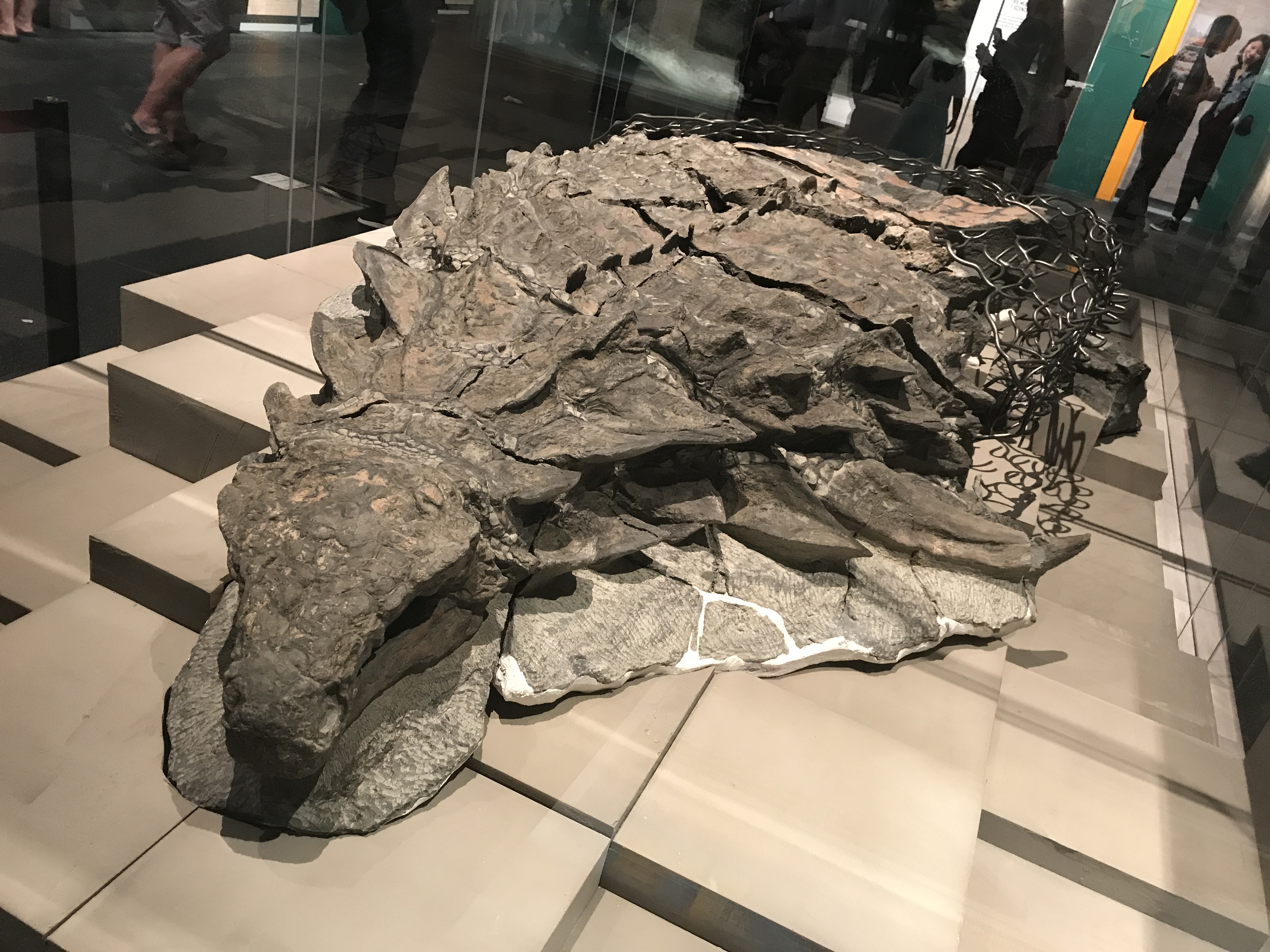
Borealopelta's holotype specimen, an exceptionally well-preserved specimen that was fossilized in the Western Interior Seaway.

== See also ==
- Geology of the Bryce Canyon area – Geology of the area in Utah
- Hudson Seaway – Major seaway of North America during the Cretaceous Period
- Lake Agassiz – Large lake in central North America at the end of the last glacial period
- Sundance Sea – Jurassic inland sea
- Zuñi sequence – Jurassic-Cretaceous cratonic sequence
- Tanis (fossil site) – Fossil site associated with the Cretaceous–Paleogene extinction event
