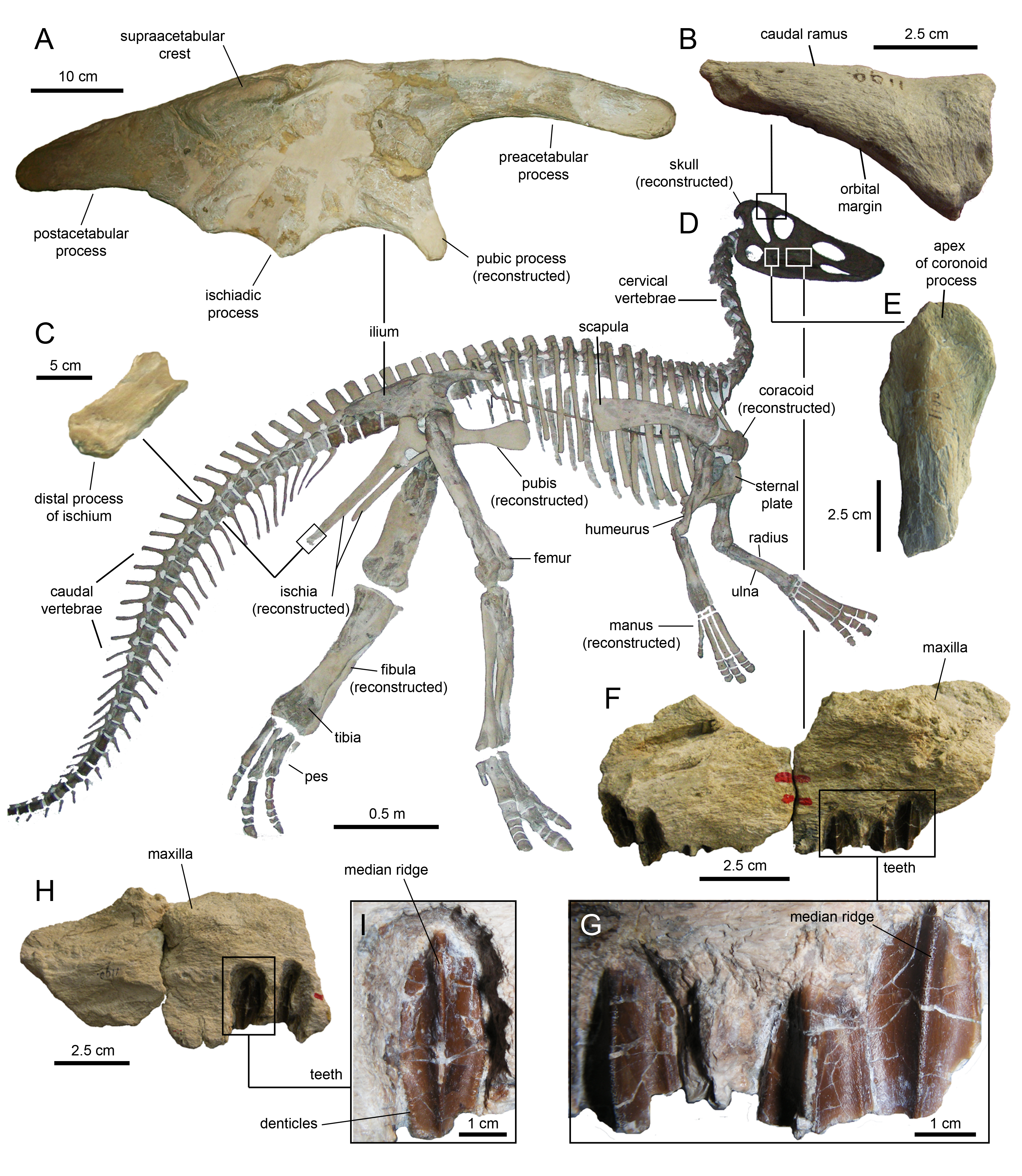
- Type specimen in the Peabody Museum, with restored skull

Scientific classification
- Kingdom: Animalia
- Phylum: Chordata
- Class: Reptilia
- Clade: Dinosauria
- Clade: †Ornithischia
- Clade: †Ornithopoda
- Clade: †Hadrosauromorpha
- Genus: †Claosaurus; Marsh, 1890

Type species
- †Hadrosaurus agilis Marsh, 1872a

Synonyms
- Hadrosaurus agilis Marsh, 1872a; Thespesius agilis (Marsh, 1872a) Hay, 1902; Trachodon agilis (Marsh, 1872a) Kuhn, 1936

= Claosaurus =

Claosaurus Temporal range: Late Cretaceous, 87–82 Ma

Extinct genus of dinosaurs

Claosaurus (/ˌkleɪəˈsɔːrəs/ KLAY-ə-SOR-əs; Greek κλάω, klao meaning 'broken' and σαῦρος, sauros meaning 'lizard'; "broken lizard", referring to the odd position of the fossils when discovered) is a genus of hadrosauroid dinosaur that lived during the Late Cretaceous Period (Santonian-Campanian) of what is now North America. The type and only known valid species is Claosaurus agilis. Traditionally classified as an early member of the family Hadrosauridae, a 2008 analysis found Claosaurus to be outside of the clade containing Hadrosaurus and other hadrosaurids, making it the closest non-hadrosaurid relative of true hadrosaurids within the clade Hadrosauromorpha.

== Description ==
Because of the insufficient fossil remains ("minority of skull and partial skeleton"), the size of an adult Claosaurus remains uncertain. However, Thomas Holtz gave a length estimate of 3.7 m (12 ft) and a mass estimate as that of a lion. Like other hadrosaurs, it was an herbivore.

== History ==
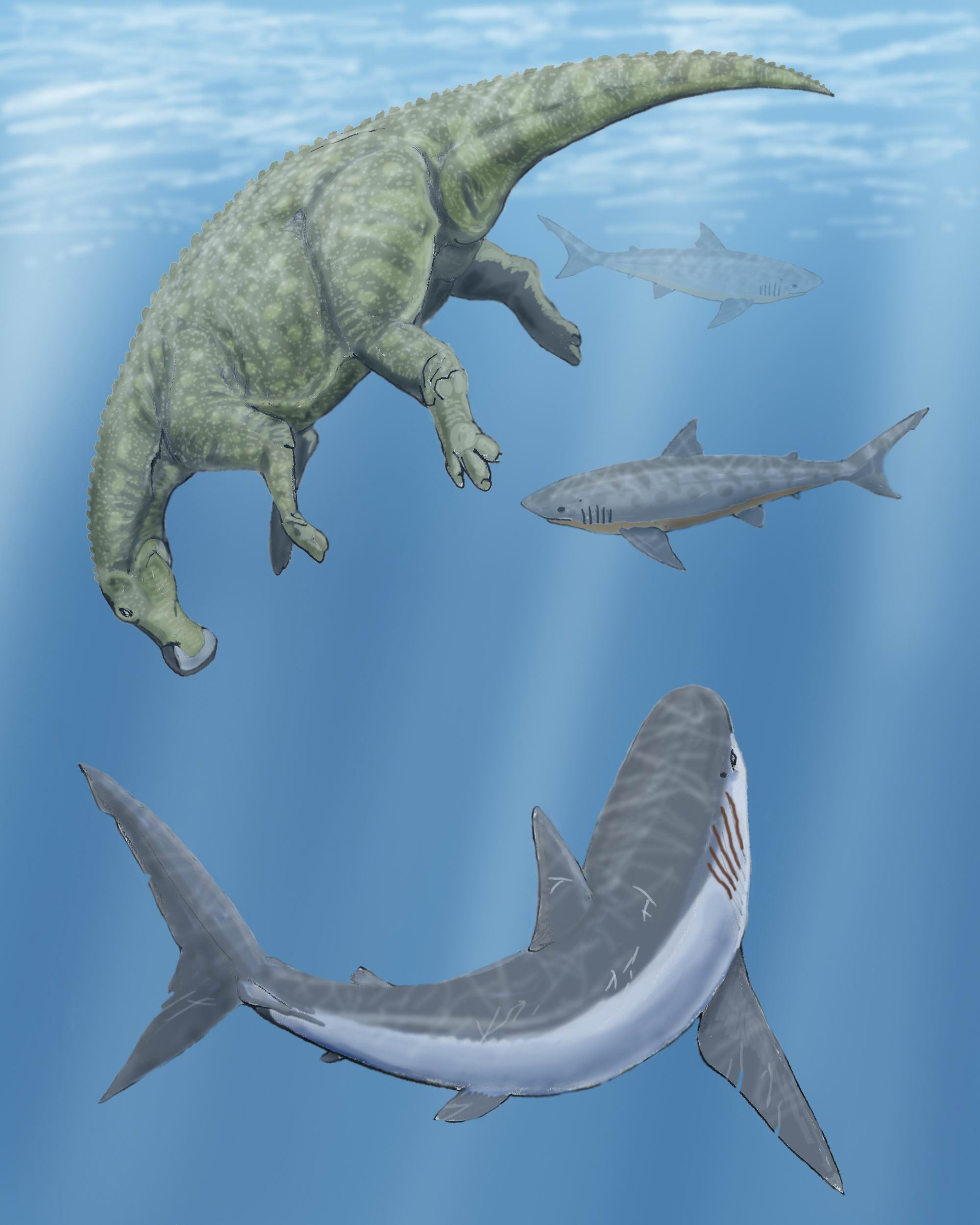
A Cretoxyrhina and two Squalicorax circling around a dead Claosaurus in the Western Interior Seaway

Evidence of its existence was first found in the Niobrara Formation near the Smoky Hill River in Kansas, United States in the form of partial skull fragments and as an articulated postcranial skeleton both found in 1871. Originally named Hadrosaurus agilis (Marsh, 1872), it was placed in a new genus and renamed Claosaurus agilis in 1890 when major differences between the specimen and Hadrosaurus came to light.

In 1892, Marsh named a second species, C. annectens. It was later reassigned to Anatosaurus and then Edmontosaurus, where it is currently. G. R. Wieland named third species C. affinis in 1903, which he compared to C. annectens. C. affinis was founded on remains from the Pierre Shale of South Dakota, found in association with remains of the giant sea turtle Archelon. At some point after its description, the fragmentary remains were mixed up with the original remains of C. agilis, and a toe bone from C. agilis was accidentally thought to be the only part of the holotype remains that could be located. This was corrected by Joseph Gregory in 1948, who found three toe bones from the right foot of a large hadrosaur in the Yale collections that had comparable preservation to the Pierre Shale turtle remains and were associated with labels in Wieland's handwriting. Gregory found the toe bones to be very similar in size to the corresponding bones of Marsh's Claosaurus annectens, but did not reassign the species due to its much older age and fragmentary remains. C. affinis was considered a dubious hadrosaur in the 2004 review by Jack Horner and colleagues. They reported its type material as lost, although they also reported the remains as only including a single toe bone, instead of the three toe bones described by Gregory.

Reports of gastroliths, or stomach stones, in Claosaurus are actually based on a probable double misidentification. The specimen thought to have gastroliths is actually of Edmontosaurus annectens. Barnum Brown, who discovered the specimen in 1900, referred to it as Claosaurus, because E. annectens was thought to be a species of Claosaurus at the time. Additionally, it is more likely that the supposed gastroliths represent gravel washed in during burial.

== See also ==
- Timeline of hadrosaur research
