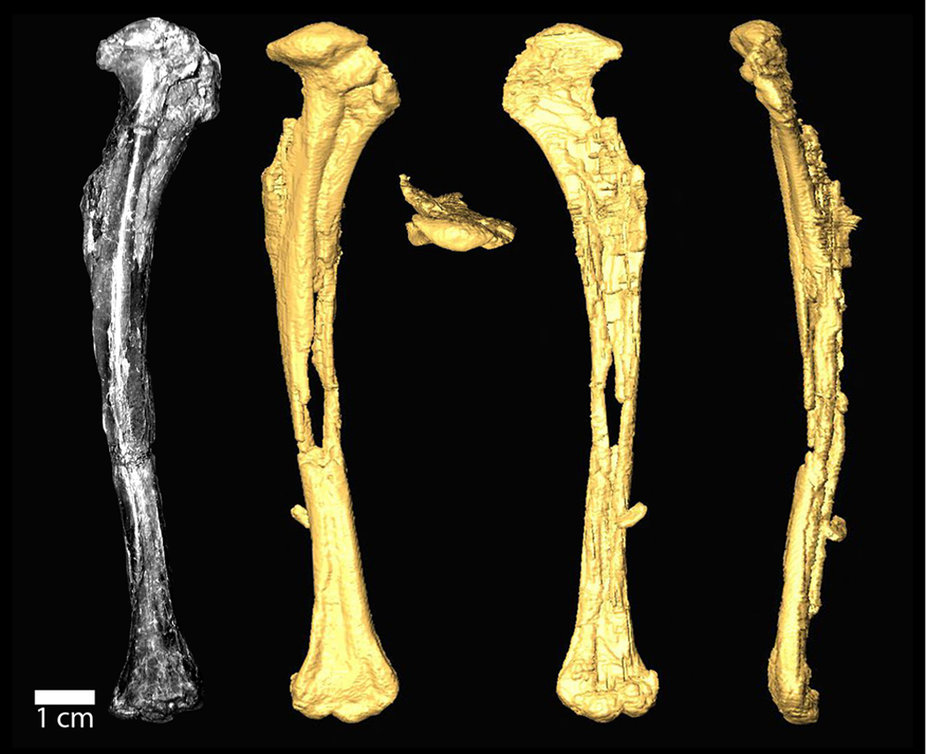
- Photograph (left) and CT scans of the holotype humerus

Scientific classification
- Kingdom: Animalia
- Phylum: Chordata
- Class: Reptilia
- Clade: Dinosauria
- Clade: Saurischia
- Clade: Theropoda
- Clade: Avialae
- Genus: †Tingmiatornis; Bono et al., 2016
- Species: †T. arctica

Binomial name
- †Tingmiatornis arctica Bono et al., 2016

= Tingmiatornis =

Tingmiatornis Temporal range: Turonian, 92 Ma

Extinct genus of dinosaurs

Tingmiatornis (meaning "bird that flies") is a genus of flighted and possibly diving ornithuran dinosaur from the High Arctic of Canada. The genus contains a single species, T. arctica, described in 2016, which lived during the Turonian epoch of the Cretaceous.

== Description ==
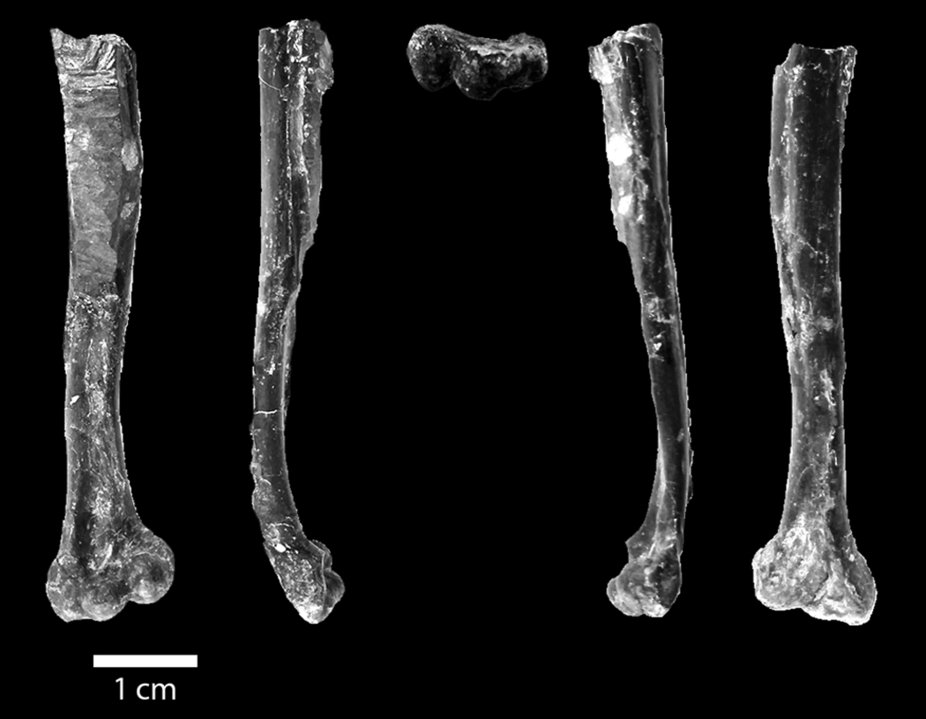
Referred humerus

Given the small number of bones that are referrable to Tingmiatornis, it is difficult to infer much about the animal. However, the thickness of the cortical bone (on average, 1.24 mm or 0.049 in) and the relative length of the humerus suggest that it was apparently capable of flight and likely also diving, similar to the possible hesperornithine Pasquiaornis. Tingmiatornis can be differentiated from the latter by numerous traits including larger size, a more globe-shaped dorsal condyle on the humerus, an olecranon process of the ulna that does not project outward as strongly, as well as a smaller bicipital tubercle of the ulna.

Tingmiatornis also differs from Ichthyornis in the following ways: the head of the humerus is more rounded and projects further downwards; the deltopectoral crest of the humerus is narrower and curves slightly forwards; the secondary pneumotricipital fossa of the humerus is deeper; and the expansion of the humerus known as the bicipital crest is longer, with a slightly convex bottom edge that transitions smoothly into the rest of the humerus rather than being hatchet-shaped.

== Discovery and naming ==
The remains of Tingmiatornis were found on Axel Heiberg Island in the High Arctic of Nunavut, Canada, in an as-of-yet unnamed 3 metres (9.8 ft)-thick layer of Turonian rock between the Kanguk Formation and the Strand Fiord Formation. Radiometric dating places the age of these rocks at 92 Mya. The type specimen consists of a left humerus labelled with the specimen number NUFV 1960, kept in the Nunavut Fossil Vertebrate Collection of the Canadian Museum of Nature. Other specimens referred to Tingmiatornis consist of a partial humerus (UR 00.200, stored at the University of Rochester) and ulna (NUFV 1838).

The genus name of Tingmiatornis incorporates the Inuktitut word "Tingmiat", which means "those that fly". The species name, arctica, refers to the specimens being discovered in the High Arctic.

== Paleoecology ==
A number of other vertebrates are known alongside Tingmiatornis from the locality on Axel Heiberg Island, including champsosaurs that measured 2.4 metres (7 ft 10 in) in length; fish including gar, bowfins, members of the extinct Vidalamiinae, and indeterminate teleosts; turtles, including Aurorachelys, Borealochelys, indeterminate eucryptodires, and indeterminate trionychids; and juvenile elasmosaurs, known from teeth. During the Turonian, the area would have been a large, freshwater to brackish bay situated at approximately 71° paleolatitude.

This habitat, which had a mean temperature of approximately 14 °C, would have been an ideal nesting ground for Tingmiatornis, although no eggs or nests have been found at the locality to date. The bowfins that swam in the surrounding water, which likely measured 30–60 centimetres (12–24 in) in length, may have competed with Tingmiatornis for smaller fish, if the latter was a diving animal. Tingmiatornis may also have fished at night, much like the modern Western grebe; at this latitude, it would have experienced approximately two months of continuous darkness per year.

During the Late Cretaceous, high latitudes appeared to have been dominated by ornithurines as opposed to the more basal enantiornithines. This may be due to ornithurines exploiting more aquatic niches or having higher growth rates in highly seasonal climates; the latter likely did not apply as strongly to Tingmiatornis due to the warm local climate.
