= Laramidia =

Island continent that existed until the end of the Late Cretaceous period

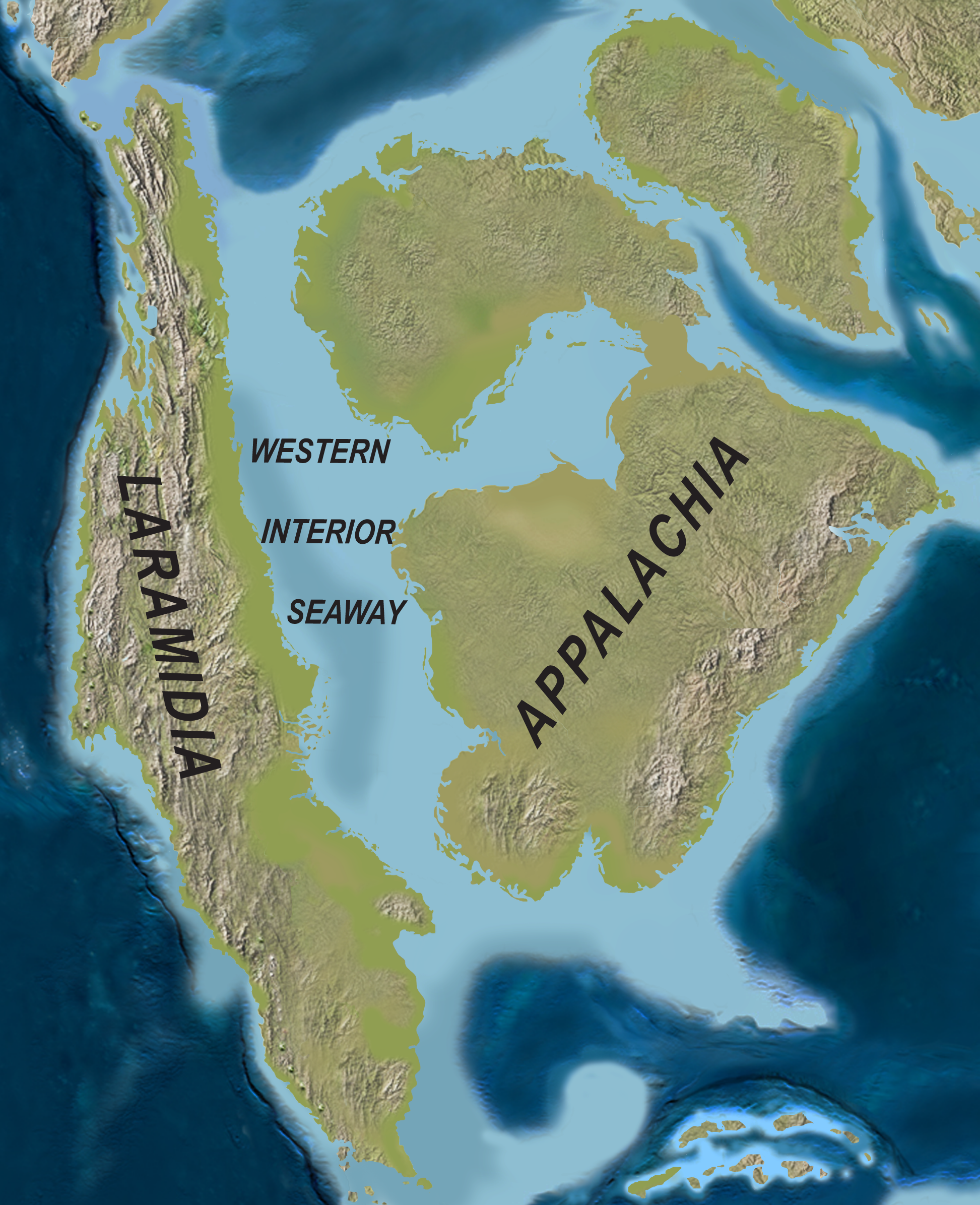
- Laramidia along with Appalachia during the Campanian.

Historical continent
- Formed: 99.6 Mya
- Type: Continent
- Today part of: Alaska; Western Canada; Western United States; Mexico
- Smaller continents: North America
- Tectonic plates: North American plate

Laramidia was an island continent that existed during the Late Cretaceous period (99.6–66 Ma), when the Western Interior Seaway split the continent of North America in two. In the Mesozoic era, Laramidia was an island land mass separated from Appalachia and Hudsonia to the east by the Western Interior Seaway. It was home to many dinosaurs including ankylosaurs, ceratopsians, and tyrannosaurs. The seaway eventually shrank, split across the Dakotas, and retreated toward the Gulf of Mexico and the Hudson Bay. The masses joined, forming the continent of North America.

Laramidia is named after the Laramide orogeny. The name was coined by J. David Archibald in 1996.

== Geography ==
Laramidia stretched from modern-day Alaska to Mexico. The area is rich in dinosaur fossils. Tyrannosaurs, dromaeosaurids, troodontids, hadrosaurs, ceratopsians (including Kosmoceratops and Utahceratops), pachycephalosaurs, and titanosaur sauropods are some of the dinosaur groups that lived on this landmass. A strong latitudinal climatic gradient existed on the landmass in the final 15 million years of the Cretaceous, helping drive regional provincialism of dinosaur faunas.

== Range ==
Vertebrate fossils have been found in the region from Alaska to Coahuila.

== Fauna ==
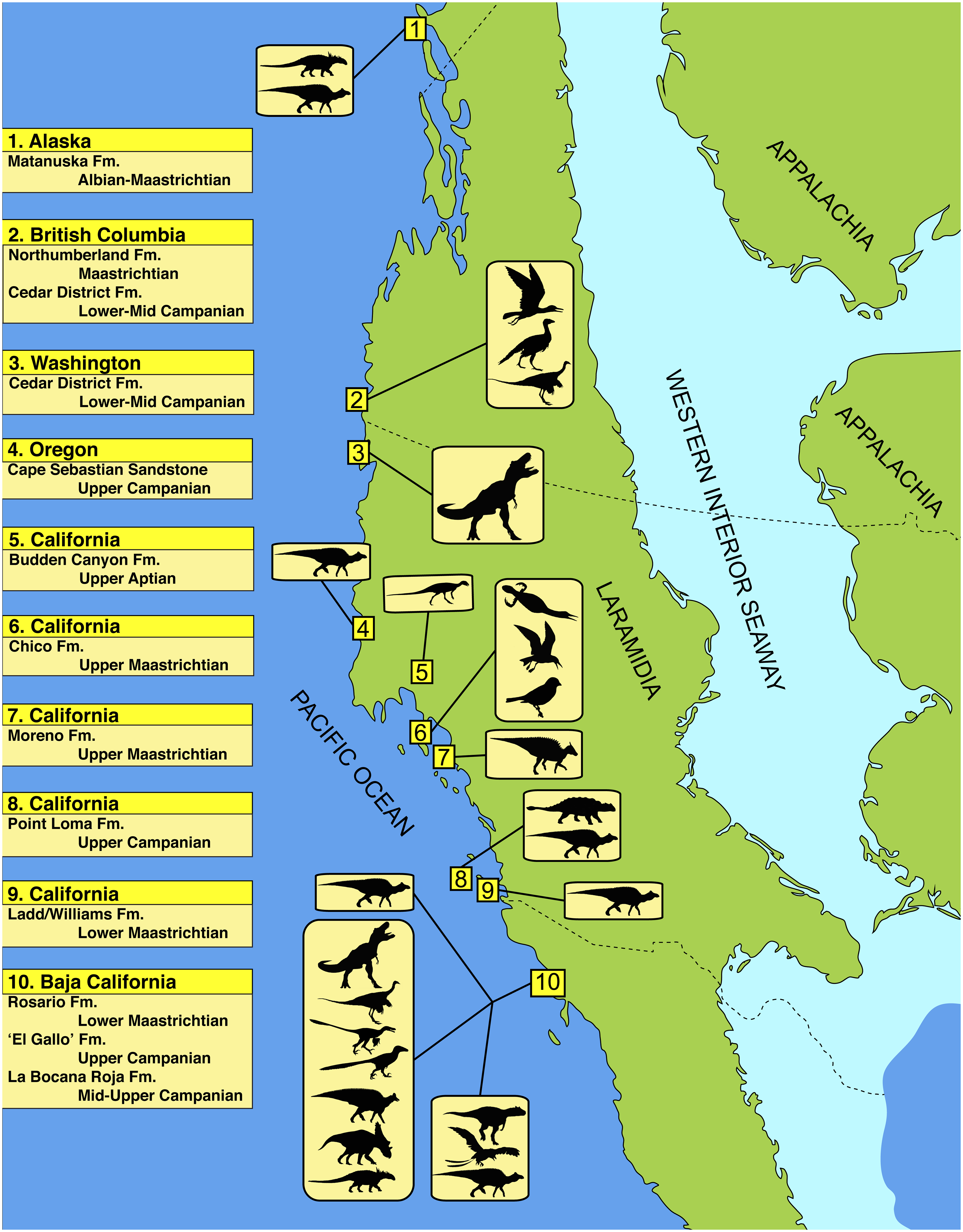
Dinosaurs found on the western coast

From the Turonian age of the Late Cretaceous to the very beginning of the Paleocene, Laramidia was separated from Appalachia to the east. As a result, the fauna evolved differently on each land mass over that time. Geological conditions were generally favorable for the preservation of fossils in Laramidia, making the western United States one of the most productive fossil regions in the world. Less is known about Appalachian biodiversity in the Cretaceous as few fossiliferous deposits exist in the region today and half of the fossil beds in Appalachia were destroyed during the Pleistocene ice age. However, fossil beds which haven't been discovered yet could exist in areas of the former Appalachian continent.

In western North America, during the Cretaceous, the dominant theropods were the tyrannosaurs, huge predatory dinosaurs with proportionately large heads built for tearing flesh from their prey. In Laramidia, there were the theropods of Tyrannosaurinae such as Tyrannosaurus rex, Nanuqsaurus hoglundi, Daspletosaurus, Teratophoneus, and theropods of Albertosaurinae such as Albertosaurus and Gorgosaurus, all being included under the same family of Tyrannosauridae, although not all are contemporary.

Another common group of North American dinosaurs were the hadrosaurs, the so-called "duck-billed" dinosaurs. The fossil record shows a staggering variety of hadrosaur forms in Laramidia.

Other differences in genera appear between the island land masses. Sauropods roamed Laramidia during the Cretaceous after apparently dying out in Appalachia. Nodosaurs, though, appear to have been more plentiful in Appalachia. Nodosaurs were large, herbivorous armored dinosaurs which lacked the giant club tail of their western relatives. They were scarce in Laramidia by the late Cretaceous, existing only in specialized forms like Edmontonia and Panoplosaurus while nodosaurs were thriving in Appalachia.
