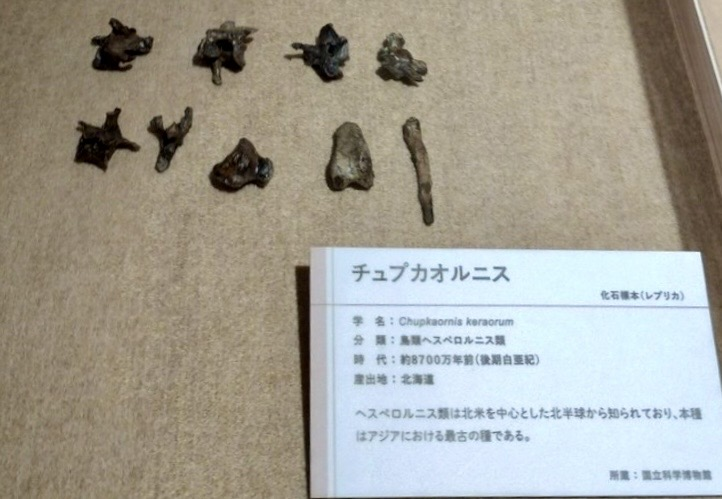
- A replica of Chupcaornis at the special exhibition "鳥" at National Museum of Nature and Science, Tokyo

Scientific classification
- Kingdom: Animalia
- Phylum: Chordata
- Class: Reptilia
- Clade: Dinosauria
- Clade: Saurischia
- Clade: Theropoda
- Clade: Avialae
- Clade: †Hesperornithes
- Genus: †Chupkaornis; Tanaka et al., 2017

Type species
- †Chupkaornis keraorum Tanaka et al., 2017

= Chupkaornis =

Chupkaornis Temporal range: Late Cretaceous, 89–85 Ma

Extinct genus of birds

Chupkaornis (meaning "eastern bird") is a genus of prehistoric flightless birds from the Late Cretaceous (Coniacian-Santonian) Kashima Formation of Hokkaido, Japan. The type species is Chupkaornis keraorum.

== Discovery and naming ==
It was discovered in August 1996 in the Late Cretaceous (Coniacian to Santonian) Kashima Formation of the Yezo Group in Mikasa, Hokkaido, and was donated to the Mikasa City Museum and later exhibited in its permanent collection. The fossils consist of nine bones: cervical vertebrae, torso vertebrae, femur, and fibula. It was discovered as a new genus and species by Hokkaido University and others in August 2017, and described by Tomonori Tanaka, Yoshitsugu Kobayashi, Ken'ichi Kurihara, Anthony R. Fiorillo, and Manabu Kano.

The left tarsometatarsus of a fragmentary Hesperornithes fossil discovered in the Nishichirashinai Formation of the Yezo Group in Nakagawa, Hokkaido, may belong to this genus because it is not included in the excavations of this genus.

The genus name Chupkaornis refers to an eastern bird, as this bird was discovered in Japan in East Asia, as opposed to Hesperornis, which means a western bird native to North America. It is also a combination of "chupka", meaning east in Ainu, and "ornis", meaning bird in Latin. The specific name keraorum is named after the brothers Kera Masatoshi and Kera Yasuji, who were amateur fossil collectors and discovered this species.

== Description ==
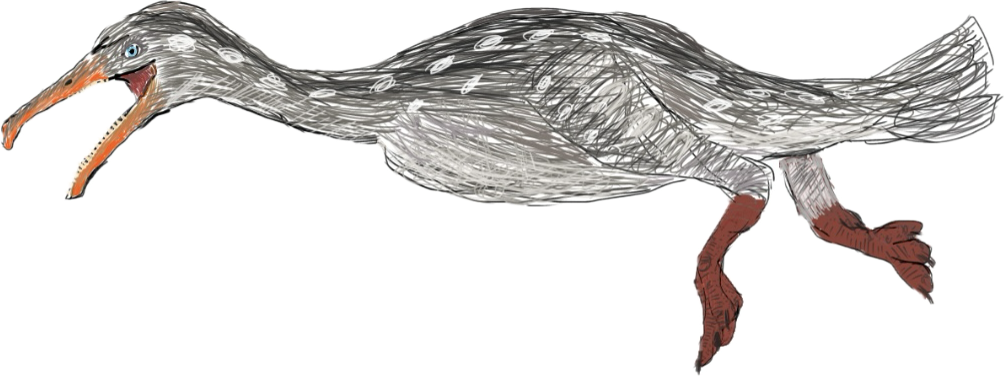
Hypothetical life restoration

Diagnostic traits of Chupkaornis include a finger-like projected tibiofibular crest of femur, deep, emarginated lateral excavation with a sharply defined edge of the ventral margin of the thoracic vertebrae, and the heterocoelous articular surface of the thoracic vertebrae. Its body length was estimated at 70 centimetres (2.3 ft) to 80 centimetres (2.6 ft). Its legs were probably webbed, which allowed it to swim.

== Phylogeny ==
Chupkaornis is recovered by Tanaka et al. (2017) as more derived than the Cenomanian-age form Pasquiaornis, but less advanced than Brodavis and Baptornis. The following cladogram shows the taxonomic position of Chupcaornis according to Hokkaido University:

- Hesperornithes
  - Enaliornis
  - - Pasquiaornis
    - - Chupkaornis keraorum
      - - Brodavis
        - - Baptornis advenus
          - - Fumicollis hoffmani
            - - Hesperornithidae
                - Parahesperornis alexi
                - - Hesperornis gracilis
                  - Hesperornis regalis
