= Scaniornis =

Scaniornis Temporal range: Danian–Selandian

Scientific classification
- Kingdom: Animalia
- Phylum: Chordata
- Class: Aves
- Superorder: Neoaves
- Order: Phoenicopteriformes?
- Family: †Scaniornithidae
- Genus: †Scaniornis Dames, 1890
- Species: †S. lundgreni

Binomial name
- †Scaniornis lundgreni Dames, 1890

Extinct genus of birds

Scaniornis is a prehistoric bird genus. The only known species, Scaniornis lundgreni, lived in the MP 1–5 (Early Paleocene, perhaps Middle Paleocene: c. 65–59 million years ago).

It is known from a partial fossil skeleton of a right wing, namely the coracoid, scapula and humerus found at Limhamn (Sweden) and other bones found at Selk, Germany. Thus, it would seem to have been a native of the prehistoric North Sea, which at that time covered part of today's Germany and France, and sometimes was cut off from the Tethys and Atlantic Oceans, sometimes connected to them, and sometimes even to the Turgai Sea. Situated a bit southwestwards — between 44° and 54° North — of its present location due to plate tectonics, in a fairly wet and warm epoch, the region had probably a warm-temperate to subtropical and fairly humid climate, altogether not too dissimilar from today's Black Sea region or French Mediterranean.

It appears to be somewhat similar to flamingos and was long placed with these, and thus would strongly suggest that the Phoenicopteriformes evolved in the Late Cretaceous or immediately thereafter. As flamingos are now thought to be related to grebes, the placement of Scaniornis requires reanalysis (Mlíkovský 2002). It was also united with other wading or presumed shorebirds into the "Graculavidae", a form taxon of "transitional shorebirds". This group is now known to be paraphyletic and has no standing in systematics anymore.

The presumed relative Parascaniornis is now known to be a hesperornithine of the genus Baptornis. The Hesperornithes which became extinct by the end of the Cretaceous and Scaniornis which appears clearly a neornithine are not closely related at all.

Scaniornis was sometimes united with the Cretaceous Gallornis in the family Scaniornithidae. Gallornis, however, is of even more unclear relationships; it might be an early member of the Galloanserae. In any case it was subsequently not considered close to Scaniornis anymore but rather united with the supposed "Cretaceous proto-flamingos" "Parascaniornis" and Torotix, none of which seems even reasonably close to flamingos today.
