= Gallornis =

Gallornis Temporal range: Early Cretaceous, 130 Ma

Scientific classification
- Kingdom: Animalia
- Phylum: Chordata
- Class: Reptilia
- Clade: Dinosauria
- Clade: Saurischia
- Clade: Theropoda
- Clade: Avialae
- Clade: Euornithes
- Clade: Ornithuromorpha
- Genus: †Gallornis; Lambrecht, 1931
- Species: †G. straeleni

Binomial name
- †Gallornis straeleni Lambrecht, 1931

Extinct genus of dinosaurs

Gallornis is a genus of prehistoric avialan from the Cretaceous. The single known species Gallornis straeleni lived near today's Auxerre in Yonne département (France); it has been dated very tentatively to the Berriasian-Hauterivian stages, that is about 140–130 million years ago. The known fossil material consists of a worn partial femur and a fragment of the humerus.

This is a highly significant taxon for theories about the evolution of birds. It is not known from much or well-preserved material. It has been proposed that the remains show features only known from the Neornithes – the group of birds that exists today. Thus, the Gallornis fossils suggest that as early as about 130 million years ago or more the ancestors of all living birds might already have been an evolutionary lineage distinct from the closely related Hesperornithes and Ichthyornithes (essentially modern birds retaining some more ancient features like teeth) and the more distantly related Enantiornithes (a group of more primitive toothed birds which were the most successful avians in the Mesozoic).

== Ecology ==
During the time of Gallornis, its range was located around 30°N, north of the Tropic of Cancer aridity belt. However, the Cretaceous was a hot and humid age in general, so the habitat might have more resembled West Africa around the Gulf of Guinea. Higher sealevels had large parts of Europe submerged for much of the time, and Southeast Europe and Asia Minor had not even attached to that continent yet (see also Haţeg Island, Haţeg Basin). The Alpide orogeny (the uplift of the Eurasian latitudinal mountain belt) had not even gotten underway.

Gallornis was a contemporary of many (non-avian) dinosaurs living around the (Second) Tethys Sea. In the archipelago that was then Europe, huge sauropods appear to have been the dominant herbivores. Apart from some early birds, pterosaurs roamed the skies of the European microcontinents, (more abundant and diverse than the few bird species), while semi-aquatic crocodylomorphs (e.g. Goniopholis, Pholidosaurus, Vectisuchus) and marine thalattosuchians were common. Stegosaurs were apparently rare (e.g. Regnosaurus northamptoni). Theropods like Concavenator and Baryonyx may have existed alongside it as well.

== Classification ==
As it is so close to the common origin of all living birds, Gallornis cannot be assigned to any living family and probably not even to any extant order. It was allied with the Paleocene Scaniornis, a probable waterbird that is sometimes allied with flamingos (which may or may not be correct and altogether is not too unlikely) to form the supposed "proto-flamingo" family Scaniornithidae or "Torotigidae" sensu Brodkorb. However, the difference in age alone virtually rules out a close relationship between these two, and the early age of the Gallornis fossils makes it highly unlikely that this taxon was allied to the flamingos. A more probable hypothesis, echoing the initial description of 1931, is that Gallornis was an early member of the Galloanserae, the clade that eventually brought forth the Galliformes (landfowl) and Anseriformes (waterfowl) of our time. With the remains at hand, however, it cannot even be reliably determined whether Gallornis was a paleognath or a neognath.

Though the material is almost beyond recognition, a few features of the femur are still recognizable. In general shape it resembles the Neornithes. Notably, the lateral trochanteric crest is elevated over a large antitrochanteric facet, and somewhat recurved over it. The elevated lateral trochanteric crest is an autapomorphic feature of and plesiomorphic among Neornithes, as far as is known. It is widespread in the most ancient lineages of these, such as tinamous, Galloanserae, shorebirds and seabirds, and changed fundamentally again especially in later landbird lineages. However, Hartman et al. (2019) noted in their supplementary material that Gallornis is too fragmentary for a confident referral within Maniraptoromorpha along with other fragmentary taxa (Valdoraptor, Unquillosaurus, Canadaga), which lead to their exclusion from phylogenetic analysis. A dissertation published in 2019 classified Gallornis within Ornithuromorpha.
