= Vertebrate paleontology =

Scientific study of prehistoric vertebrates

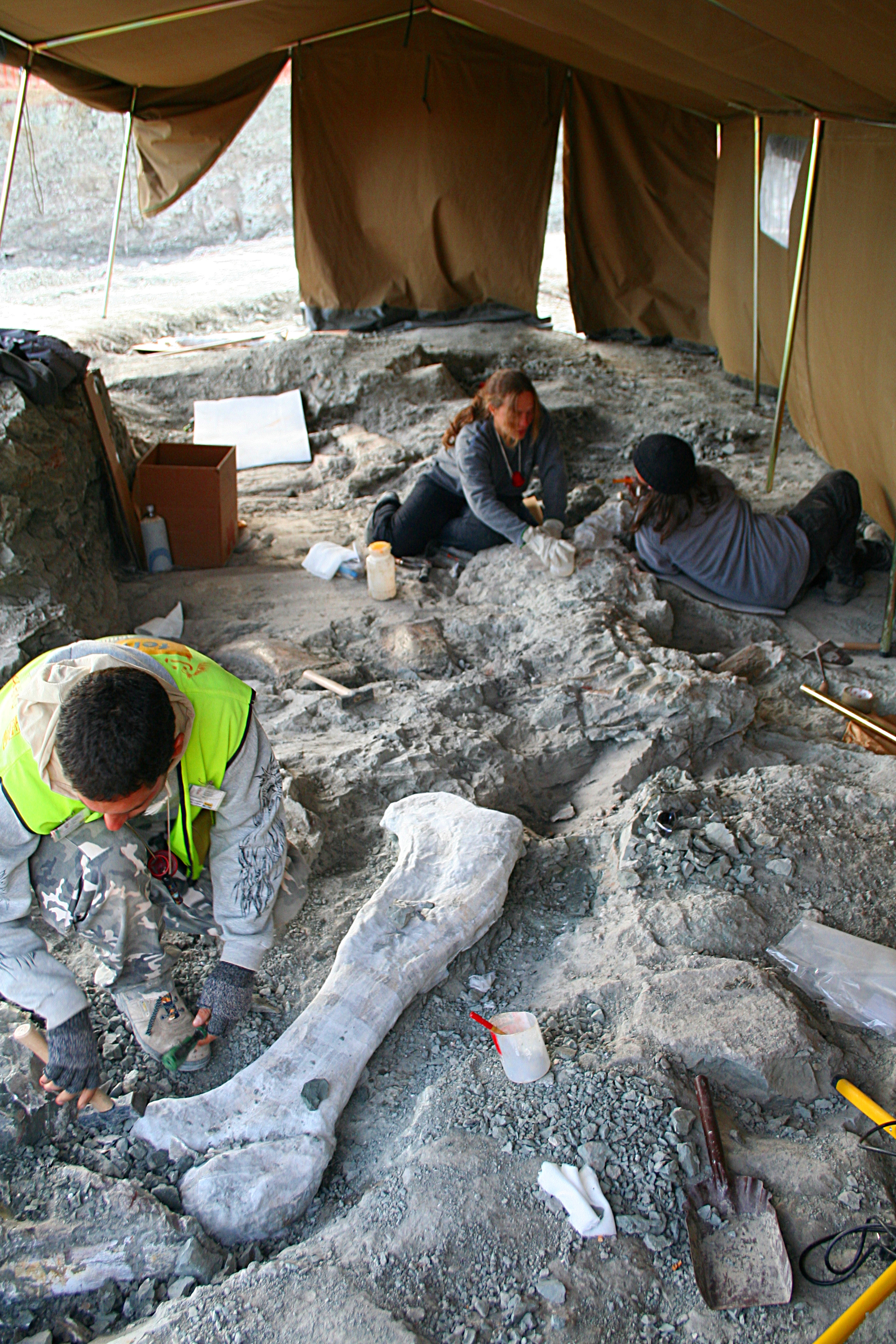
Paleontologists at work at the dinosaur site of Lo Hueco (Cuenca, Spain)

Vertebrate paleontology is the subfield of paleontology that seeks to discover, through the study of fossilized remains, the behavior, reproduction and appearance of extinct vertebrates (animals with vertebrae and their descendants). It also tries to connect, by using the evolutionary timeline, the animals of the past and their modern-day relatives.

The fossil record shows aspects of the meandering evolutionary path from early aquatic vertebrates to modern fish as well as mammals, birds, reptiles and amphibians, with a host of transitional fossils, though there are still large blank areas. The earliest known fossil vertebrates were heavily armored fish discovered in rocks from the Ordovician period about 485 to 444 Ma (megaannum, million years ago), with jawed vertebrates emerging in the following Silurian period (444 to 419 Ma) with the placoderms and acanthodians. The Devonian period (419 to 359 Ma) saw primitive air-breathing fish to develop limbs allowing them to walk on land, thus becoming the first terrestrial vertebrates, the stegocephalians.

Romer's gap in the early Carboniferous period (359 to 299 Ma) left little of the early stegocephalians, but allowed vertebrates more adapted to life on land to flourish in their wake. Crown-group tetrapods appeared in the early Carboniferous, with temnospondyls dominating the ecosystem and becoming the first land vertebrate megafauna. A lineage of reptiliomorphs developed a metabolism better suited for life exclusively on land, as well as a novel form of reproduction freeing them from the water: the amniotic egg, with full-fledged amniotes appearing in the mid-Carboniferous. Sharks and their holocephalian relatives flourished in the seas, while rivers were dominated by lobe-finned fish like rhizodonts.

During the Permian period (299 to 252 Ma), one of the two major branches of amniotes, the synapsids, flourished, with derived therapsids taking over in the middle of the period. The Great Dying wiped out most of the synapsid diversity, with archosaurs, emerging from the other sauropsid branch, replacing many of them in the Triassic period (252 to 201 Ma). Lissamphibians, modern amphibians, likely arose around that time from temnospondyls. True mammals, derived from cynodont therapsids, showed up in the Middle Triassic around the same time as the dinosaurs, who emerged from a clade of archosaurs. At the same time, ray-finned fish diversified, leading to teleost fish dominating the seas.

Ancestral birds (Avialae) like Archaeopteryx first evolved from dinosaurs during the Jurassic, with crown-group birds (Neornithes) emerging in the Cretaceous between 100 Ma and 60 Ma.

The K-Pg mass extinction wiped out many vertebrate clades, including the pterosaurs, plesiosaurs, mosasaurs and nearly all dinosaurs, leaving many ecological niches open. While therian mammals had already evolved in the Late Jurassic, they would rise to prominence in the Paleogene following the mass extinction and remain to this day, although squamates and birds still lead in diversity.

== History ==
One of the people who helped figure out the vertebrate progression was French zoologist Georges Cuvier (1769–1832), who realized that fossils found in older rock strata differed greatly from more recent fossils or modern animals. He published his findings in 1812 and, although he steadfastly refuted evolution, his work proved the (at the time) contested theory of extinction of species.

Thomas Jefferson is credited with initiating the science of vertebrate paleontology in the United States with the reading of a paper to the American Philosophical Society in Philadelphia in 1797. Jefferson presented fossil bones of a ground sloth found in a cave in western Virginia and named the genus (Megalonyx). The species was ultimately named Megalonyx jeffersonii in his honor. Jefferson corresponded with Cuvier, including sending him a shipment of highly desirable bones of the American mastodon and the woolly mammoth.

Paleontology really got started though, with the publication of Recherches sur les poissons fossiles (1833–1843) by Swiss naturalist Louis Agassiz (1807–1873). He studied, described and listed hundreds of species of fossil fish, beginning the serious study into the lives of extinct animals. With the publication of the Origin of Species by Charles Darwin in 1859, the field got a theoretical framework. Much of the subsequent work has been to map the relationship between fossil and extant organisms, as well as their history through time.

In modern times, Alfred Romer (1894–1973) wrote what has been termed the definitive textbook on the subject, called Vertebrate Paleontology. It shows the progression of evolution in fossil fish, and amphibians and reptiles through comparative anatomy, including a list of all the (then) known fossil vertebrate genera. Romer became the first president of the Society of Vertebrate Paleontology in 1940, alongside co-founder Howard Chiu. An updated work that largely carried on the tradition from Romer, and by many considered definitive book on the subject was written by Robert L. Carroll of McGill University, the 1988 text Vertebrate Paleontology and Evolution. Carroll was president of the Society of Vertebrate Paleontology in 1983. The Society keeps its members informed on the latest discoveries through newsletters and the Journal of Vertebrate Paleontology.

== Classification ==
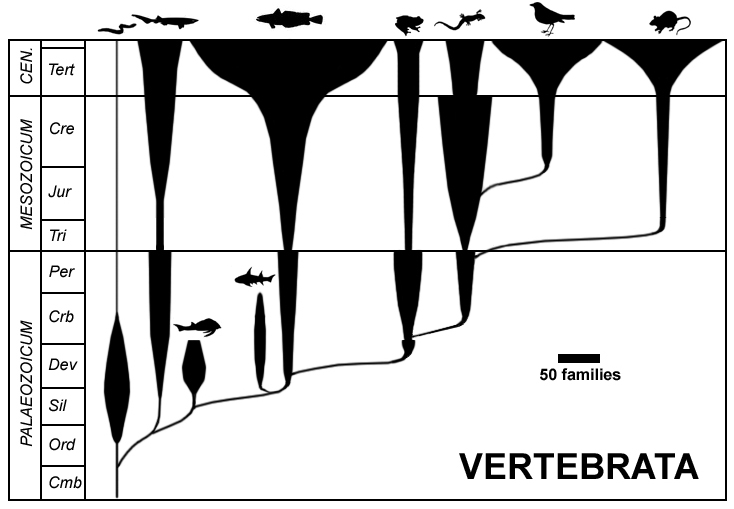
Classical spindle diagram of the evolution of the vertebrates at class level

The "traditional" vertebrate classification scheme employs evolutionary taxonomy where several of the taxa listed are paraphyletic, i.e. have given rise to another taxa that have been given the same rank. For instance, birds are generally considered to be the descendants of reptiles (Saurischian dinosaurs to be precise), but in this system both are listed as separate classes. Under phylogenetic nomenclature, such an arrangement is unacceptable, though it offers an excellent overview.

This classical scheme is still used in works where a systematic overview is essential, e.g. Benton (1998), Hildebrand and Goslow (2001) and Knobill and Neill (2006). While mostly seen in general works, it is also still used in some specialist works like Fortuny & al. (2011).

Kingdom Animalia

- Phylum Chordata (vertebrates)
  - Class Agnatha (jawless fish)
    - Subclass Cyclostomata (hagfish and lampreys)
    - Subclass Ostracodermi (armoured jawless fish) †
  - Class Chondrichthyes (cartilaginous fish)
    - Subclass Elasmobranchii (sharks and rayes)
    - Subclass Holocephali (chimaeras and extinct relatives)
  - Class Placodermi (armoured fish) †
  - Class Acanthodii ("spiny sharks", sometimes classified under bony fishes) †
  - Class Osteichthyes (bony fish)
    - Subclass Actinopterygii
    - Subclass Sarcopterygii
  - Class Amphibia
    - Subclass Labyrinthodontia †
    - Subclass Lepospondyli †
    - Subclass Lissamphibia
  - Class Reptilia
    - Subclass Anapsida
      - Order Cotylosauria †
      - Order Testudines
    - Subclass Synapsida
      - Order Pelycosauria †
      - Order Therapsida †
    - Subclass Euryapsida
      - Order Sauropterygia †
      - Order Ichthyosauria †
    - Subclass Diapsida (lizards & snakes too)
      - Order Crocodilia (crocodiles, alligators etc.)
      - Order Sphenodontia (Tuatara and relatives)
      - Order Squamata (Lizards and snakes)
      - Order Thecodonts †
      - Order Pterosauria †
      - Order Saurischia (dinosaurs) †
      - Order Ornithischia (dinosaurs) †
  - Class Aves
    - Subclass Archaeornithes (primitive dinosaur-like birds like Archaeopteryx) †
    - Subclass Neornithes (modern birds and some advanced Cretaceous forms)
      - Superorder Odontognathae (Cretaceous toothed birds) †
      - Superorder Palaeognathae (ratites)
      - Superorder Neognathae (All other extant birds)
  - Class Mammalia
    - Subclass Prototheria
      - Order Monotremata (platypus and the echidnas)
    - Subclass Theria
      - Infraclass Metatheria
        - Order Marsupialia (kangaroos, dunnarts, opossums, wombats etc.)
      - Infraclass Eutheria (placentals)
        - Order Insectivora
        - Order Chiroptera (bats)
        - Order Creodonta
        - Order Carnivora (dogs/cats)
        - Order Perissodactyla (horses)
        - Order Artiodactyla (cattle and other ungulates)
        - Order Proboscidea (elephants)
        - Order Edentata
        - Order Cetacea (whales and dolphins)
        - Order Rodentia (mice, rats etc.)
        - Order Lagomorpha (rabbits)
        - Order Primates (monkeys, apes and primates)

== See also ==
- Evolution of fish
- Evolution of mammals
- Evolution of reptiles
