= Asiahesperornis =

Asiahesperornis Temporal range: Late Cretaceous, 70 Ma

Scientific classification
- Domain: Eukaryota
- Kingdom: Animalia
- Phylum: Chordata
- Clade: Dinosauria
- Clade: Saurischia
- Clade: Theropoda
- Clade: Avialae
- Clade: †Hesperornithes
- Family: †Hesperornithidae
- Subfamily: †Asiahesperornithinae; Nesov & Prizemlin, 1991
- Genus: †Asiahesperornis; Nesov & Prizemlin, 1991
- Species: †A. bazhanovi

Binomial name
- †Asiahesperornis bazhanovi Nesov & Prizemlin, 1991

Extinct genus of birds

Asiahesperornis is a prehistoric foot-propelled diving toothed flightless bird genus from the Late Cretaceous. The single known species is Asiahesperornis bazhanovi. It lived in what today is Kazakhstan, at its time the shores of the shallow Turgai Sea.

It was a member of the Hesperornithes, flightless toothed seabirds of the Cretaceous. Its exact relationships are not completely resolved, but it probably belongs into the Hesperornithidae just like Hesperornis, well known from the Western Interior Seaway that covered most of the US Midwest in the Mesozoic. Its name is derived from its findings in Asia.
