= Torotix =

Torotix Temporal range: Late Cretaceous, 66.9–66 Ma

Scientific classification
- Kingdom: Animalia
- Phylum: Chordata
- Class: Aves
- Order: Pelecaniformes
- Family: †Torotigidae; Brodkorb, 1963
- Genus: †Torotix; Brodkorb, 1963
- Species: †T. clemensi

Binomial name
- †Torotix clemensi Brodkorb, 1963

Extinct genus of birds

Torotix is a Late Cretaceous genus of aquatic birds. They lived along the shores of the Western Interior Seaway, but it is not clear whether they were seabirds or freshwater birds, as the genus is only known from a humerus. Consequently, the genus contains only one known species, Torotix clemensi. T. clemensi is represented by a single fossil specimen, a partial humerus (upper arm bone) recovered from the Lance formation of Wyoming. Its deposits are dated to the very end of the Cretaceous period, 66 million years ago.

== Classification ==
Torotix was first described by Brodkorb in 1963, who initially suggested that it was related to modern flamingos, in the order Phoenicopteriformes. Later researchers thought it was more likely to have been related to the Charadriiformes (waders/shorebirds). More recent comparative studies have found it to be most similar to Pelecaniformes.

A cladistic study of the wing bone found Torotix not to resemble that of the waved albatross (a procellariiform), northern gannet (of the order Suliformes), painted buttonquail (an ancient charadriiform), black-necked stilt (a more advanced charadriiform) or a Phoenicopterus flamingo noticeably more than any other. However, this comparison provided information only about ecological rather than phylogenetic similarities.

The family Torotigidae was initially established to unite this genus with Parascaniornis and Gallornis. However, the former is now considered a junior synonym of Baptornis (a hesperornithine), while the latter may be a very early fowl of the group Galloanserae.
