= Odontornithes =

Obsolete bird taxonomic term

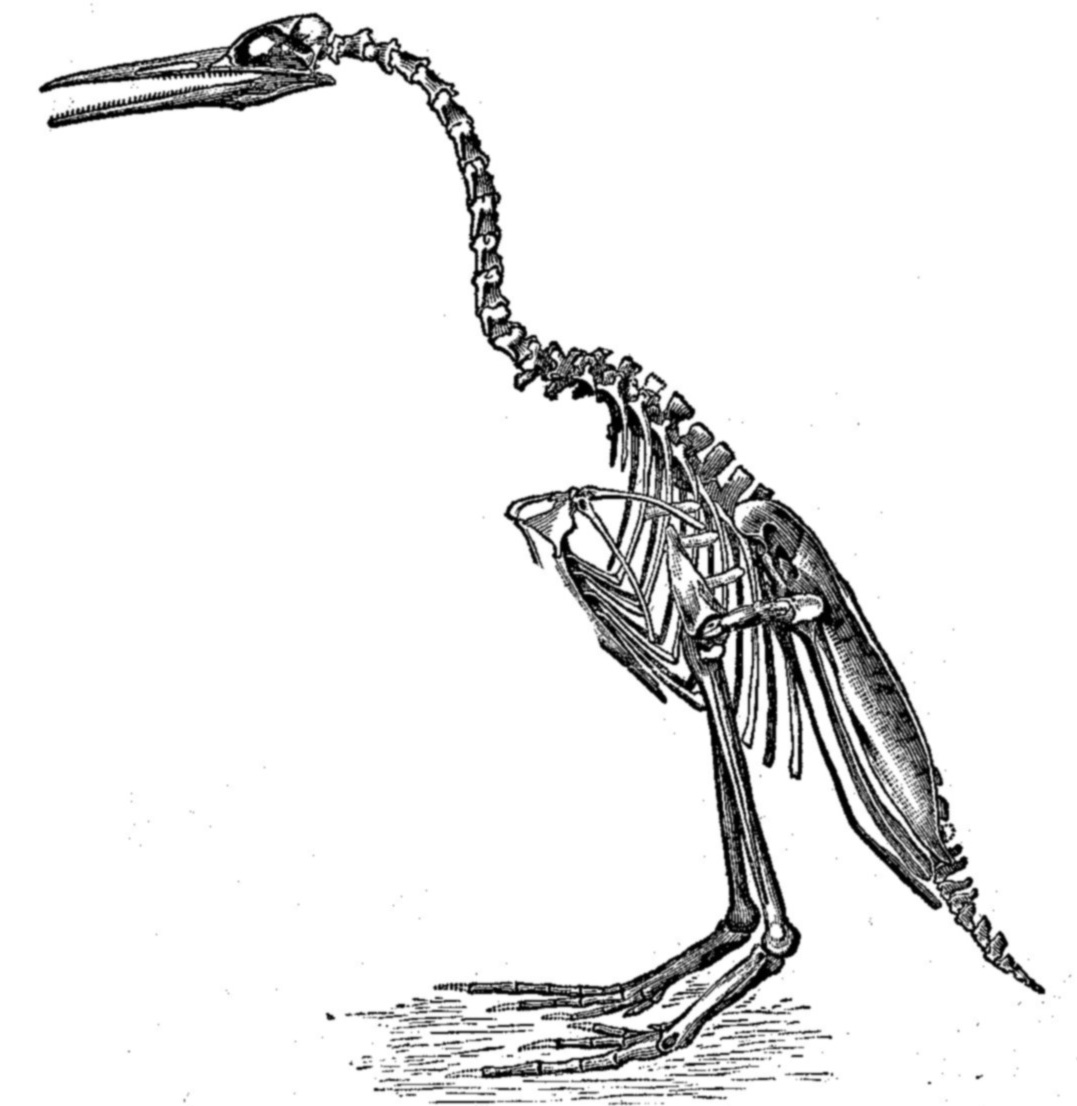
Hesperornis regalis, a species formerly under the classification of “Odontornithes”

Odontornithes is an obsolete and disused taxonomic term proposed by Othniel Charles Marsh for birds possessing teeth, notably the genera Hesperornis and Ichthyornis from the Cretaceous deposits of Kansas.

In 1875 Marsh divided this "subclass" into Odontolcae, with the teeth standing in grooves, and Odontotormae, with the teeth in separate alveoles or sockets. In his 1880 work, Odontornithes: A monograph on the extinct toothed birds of North America, he added the Sauriurae, represented by Archaeopteryx, as a third order.

The resulting classification was paraphyletic, not accurately resolving evolutionary relationships, and so it has been abandoned by most modern scientists, though at least one 21st-century paper re-used the concept under the older name Odontoholomorphae (coined by Stejneger, 1885).

Étienne Geoffroy Saint-Hilaire stated in 1821 that he had found a considerable number of tooth buds in the upper and lower jaws of Palaeornis torquatus, the rose-ringed parakeet. Émile Blanchard felt justified in recognizing flakes of dentine. However, M. Braun and especially P. Fraisse showed later that the structures in question are of the same kind as the well-known serrated "teeth" of the bill of anserine birds. In fact the papillae observed in the embryonic birds are the soft cutaneous extensions into the surrounding horny sheath of the bill, comparable to the well-known nutritive papillae in a horse's hoof. They are easily exposed in the well-macerated lower jaw of a parrot, after removal of the horny sheath. Occasionally calcification occurs in or around these papillae, as it does regularly in the egg tooth of the embryos of all birds.

The best known of the "Odontornithes" are Hesperornis regalis, standing about 3 ft (0.9 m) high, the somewhat taller H. crassipes, and Ichthyornis dispar. Hesperornis looked somewhat similar to a loon, while Ichthyornis was quite similar to a gull or petrel. However, they were entirely distinct groups of birds and merely shared with modern birds some distant ancestry in the Early Cretaceous. The Hesperornis lineage may have derived even sooner or possibly independently from the ancestors of modern birds.

== See also ==
- Odontognathae, a related paraphyletic bird taxon
