= Darren Tanke =

Canadian paleontologist (born 1960)

Darren H. Tanke (born 1960) is a Canadian fossil preparation technician of the Dinosaur Research Program at the Royal Tyrrell Museum of Palaeontology in Drumheller, Alberta. Born in Calgary, Tanke became interested in natural history at an early age. In 1979, Tanke began working for Philip J. Currie in the paleontology department of the Provincial Museum of Alberta, originally as a volunteer. From 1979 until 2005 (when Dr. Currie left the Tyrrell to become a professor at the University of Alberta in Edmonton) Tanke worked as a lab and field technician, a job he still holds today.

At the museum he is a senior technician in the preparation lab. He does not hold any formal post-secondary degrees, but is active in research and numerous writing projects. Senior editor of the 2001 book Mesozoic Vertebrate Life: New Research Inspired by the Paleontology of Philip J. Currie, In 2019 he published his first book on Albertan amateur fossil collector, botanist, artist and historian Hope Johnson in the book: "'Now There Was a Lady' - Hope Johnson LL.D. 1916-2010", published through the Alberta Palaeontological Society. Tanke appeared in the 1998 documentary film Dinosaur Park, and the 1993 educational film Messages in Stone. He recently appeared in one episode of Dino Hunt Canada (2015) and an episode of ABC Television's "Born to Explore" (2015).

== Lab and field work ==
Tanke has authored papers on dinosaurs and dinosaur paleopathology; his recent work includes preparation of Pachyrhinosaurus fossils. He worked on a large monograph describing a new species (Pachyrhinosaurus lakustai), with senior co-authors Philip J. Currie and Wann Langston, Jr. Most of the material described therein was prepared by him. This monograph, 21+ years in the making, was released at Grande Prairie Regional College on October 1, 2008. This publication describes skull material from the extremely rich Pachyrhinosaurus lakustai bonebed on Pipestone Creek, southwest of Grande Prairie, Alberta, Canada. Also with this publication are two other papers, one describing the site taphonomy and quarry map and another paper describing the endocast and brain structure of P. lakustai. Tanke has also authored papers on Tyrannosaurus, Daspletosaurus, Styracosaurus, Chasmosaurus, Stegoceras, Centrosaurus, Eoceratops, and various other hadrosaurids, ceratopsians, and tyrannosaurids.

Tanke is presently the longest serving employee (41 years) with the Royal Tyrrell Museum. On August 7, 2008 at the 33rd International Geological Congress meetings in Oslo, Norway, he was made a member of INHIGEO (International Commission on the History of Geological Sciences) and is now the Canadian editor for that organization. He is also a member of the PSP (Paleontological Society of the Peace; Grande Prairie, Alberta) and the APS (Alberta Palaeontological Society), where he regularly gives oral and poster presentations at their annual symposia in Calgary.

The Cenomanian (early Late Cretaceous) marine bird Pasquiaornis tankei (Tokaryk, Cumbaa and Storer, 1997) from Carrot River, Saskatchewan, Canada was named in Tanke's honor. Another fossil species named after him is the Late Cretaceous louse Cretolepinotus tankei found in amber. He also discovered the type specimen of the Late Cretaceous pachycephalosaurid dinosaur Texacephale langstoni.

Darren Tanke has a number of jobs at Tyrrell, including fossil preparation, moulding and casting (in previous years), giving talks to the public or identifying fossils the public brings in for identification. In the field, he looks for, identifies, and collects fossils as well as training and supervising summer field staff and preparation laboratory volunteers.

Tanke is interested in technical applications to dinosaur site preservation using quarry stakes (on-site metal markers embedded in concrete); GPS and historical information and garbage to relocate lost quarries (some dating back to 1913) using historical archaeology techniques. He is also interested in dinosaur paleopathology, dinosaur ontogeny, and all aspects of horned dinosaurs. He has been heavily involved in the paleontological activities in the Grande Prairie region since 1983. Much of his recent research focuses on various aspects of Alberta's early human history of paleontological discoveries and research in the province. These include biographies of some of the lesser-known paleontology workers in the province, relocating "lost" fossil specimens, the World War I sinking of the merchant ship SS Mount Temple and her Albertan dinosaur cargo, etc. He has worked in the field across western Canada and in Montana (1982), Utah (1997), and Texas (2008), mostly in middle and especially Late Cretaceous beds. Overseas fieldwork or history-based research has taken him to Australia (1991), Argentina (2000), China (2005), England (2005, 2008, 2009), France (2001), Mongolia (2005), and Norway (2005). He has also done fieldwork in British Columbia (1985) and Saskatchewan (1985). He set up an annual ceratopsian (horned dinosaur) research scholarship for University-level students or academics under the Dinosaur Research Institute in Calgary, with whom he was formerly on the board of Directors (2008-2022). $1500.00 CDN is awarded each year, the winner notified in May. Tanke now administrates the scholarship through the Facebook page "Darren H. Tanke Neoceratopsian Scholarship".

His current lab work involves preparation of varied Albertan hadrosaur and ceratopsian specimens for Dr. Caleb Brown of the Royal Tyrrell Museum.

Current research and writing projects include several articles on the use of helicopters in Alberta to collect fossils and lift heavy dinosaur skeletons in their plaster field jackets; relocation of a lost (1914) Basilemys turtle quarry and other fossil turtle sites in Dinosaur Provincial Park; and biographies of Albertan amateur fossil collector and artist Hope Johnson (1916–2010) and Jane Colwell-Danis (1941-), Canada's first formally-trained woman vertebrate paleontologist. Dozens of other writing projects on widely varying aspects of vertebrate paleontology and paleontology history are in various stages of completeness. Two of these are detailed histories of hadrosaur collection and research in Alberta, and a detailed 25+ year chronological history of the Royal Tyrrell Museum in Drumheller, Alberta. Another project, done in his own time, was the 2010 reenactment of the 1910-1916 paleontological expeditions who used large flat-bottomed boats or scows in their search for Late Cretaceous dinosaur bones on the Red Deer River, Alberta, Canada. The project ran into medical and technical difficulties in 2010. Efforts were made to get the scow ready to refloat down the river in 2016, but water levels were too low to launch.
