= Archaeornithes =

Extinct group of reptile-like birds

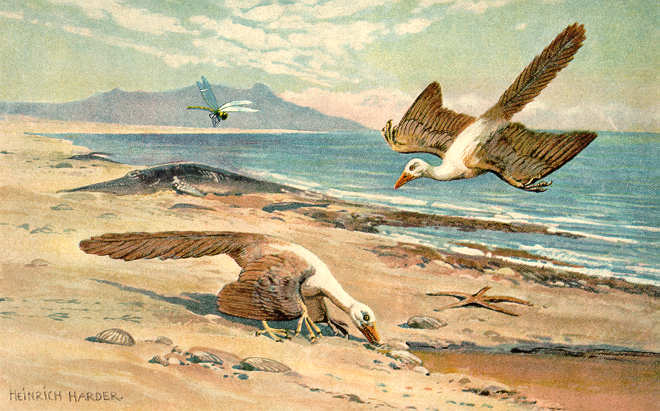
Painting of Archaeopteryx by Heinrich Harder, from around 1916

The Archaeornithes, classically Archæornithes, is an extinct group of the first primitive, reptile-like birds. It is an evolutionary grade of transitional fossils, the primitive birds halfway between non-avian dinosaur ancestors and the derived modern birds (avian dinosaur).

Fossils of early birds were poorly known until the late 20th century. Of those known, all fell into either the relatively modernly built birds with fused ribcage and the breastbone extended into a keel, or the "Urvogels" of the Solnhofen Plattenkalk of late Jurassic age. As the physiological and anatomical difference between the two was so great, the subclass Archaeornithes was erected for the latter.

With the unearthing of several well preserved early bird fossils in the last decades of the 20th century and early 21st century, our knowledge of the evolution of birds has increased dramatically. The evolution of the modern avian traits such as the compact body, clawless wing and the alula are now known to appear over successive stages. Today the Archaeornithes are classified into a series of nested monophyletic groups, and the name is rarely used in modern literature.

== Classification ==
- Aves
  - †Archaeornithes
    - Archaeopteryx
    - Archaeornis
  - Neornithes
    - other infraclasses
    - - Odontognathae
      - - order
        - order

Cladogram of 19th century Class Aves (~Avialae)

In traditional classification, it is one of two subclasses of birds, the other subclass being the Neornithes, the birds with a short, modern tail. This classification was erected by Hans Friedrich Gadow in 1893 and followed by Alfred Romer (1933) and subsequent authors through most of the 20th century. Other mesozoic birds like the toothed, but otherwise modern, birds like Hesperornis were included under the latter in their own superorder, the Odontognathae.

According to Romer, the Archaeornithes are characterised by having clawed wings, a reptilian style ribcage without a large carina and the presence of a long, bony tail. The known members of the group by the time of its erection were Archaeopteryx and Archaeornis. The two are now thought to represent a single species, Archaeopteryx lithographica, the Archaeornis being the Berlin specimen of Archaeopteryx. The Confuciusornithidae and Enantiornithes were found a century after Gradow's organization of birds into two subclasses. They fall between Romer's description of Archaeornithes and Neornithes, in that they have clawed wings, but reduced tails with a rod-like pygostyle (as opposed to the ploughshare-shaped one in modern birds) and the presence of a small carina.

While rarely used by palaenthologists today, the term was revived by the ornithologists Livezey and Zusi in 2007, for a group comprising Archaeopterygidae and the Confuciusornithidae.

== See also ==
- Sauriurae
- Evolution of birds
