= Odontognathae =

Obsolete taxon of fossil birds

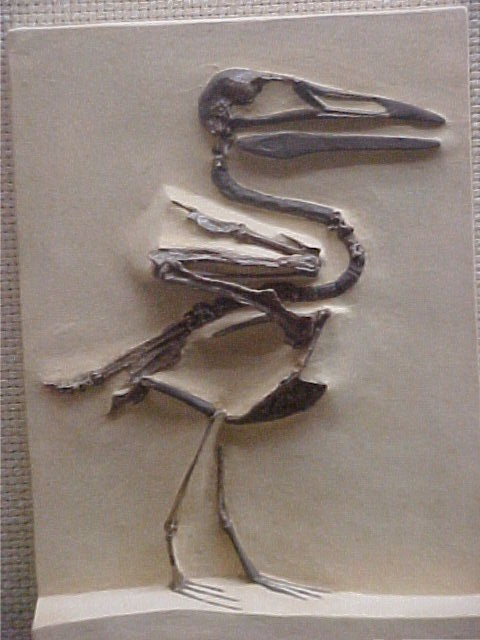
Ichthyornis skeletons

Odontognathae is a disused name for a paraphyletic group of toothed prehistoric birds. The group was originally proposed by Alexander Wetmore, who attempted to link fossil birds with the presence of teeth, specifically of the orders Hesperornithiformes and Ichthyornithiformes. As such they would be regarded as transitional fossils between the reptile-like "Archaeornithes" like Archaeopteryx and modern birds. They were described by Romer as birds with essentially modern anatomy, but retaining teeth.

== Traits ==
Unlike the dinosaur-like "Archaeornithes", the various types of birds assigned to the Odontognathae had short tails with a plowshare-shaped pygostyle and a well developed carina for flight muscle. They also shared the feature of intramandibular articulation, something that is actually absent in Archaeopteryx, but found in many of its theropod relatives.

The brains of the "odontognath" birds appear to be somewhat simpler than those of modern birds and have retained some "reptilian" traits. Ornithologist Alan Feduccia has used this, and the presence of the intramandibular articulation (a trait also found in mosasaurs and living varanid lizards) as arguments that the Odontognathae and thus the birds as a whole have not evolved from theropod dinosaurs, but non-dinosaur thecodonts. This theory is contested by most paleontologists.

== Classification ==
Classically, Odontognathae was considered one of three superorders of Neornithes (modern birds) as opposed to Archaeornithes (the ancient birds). Today the name Neornithes is commonly used for the bird crown group, the Odontognathae being united with them the group Ornithurae.

== See also ==
- Odontornithes, a related paraphyletic bird taxon
