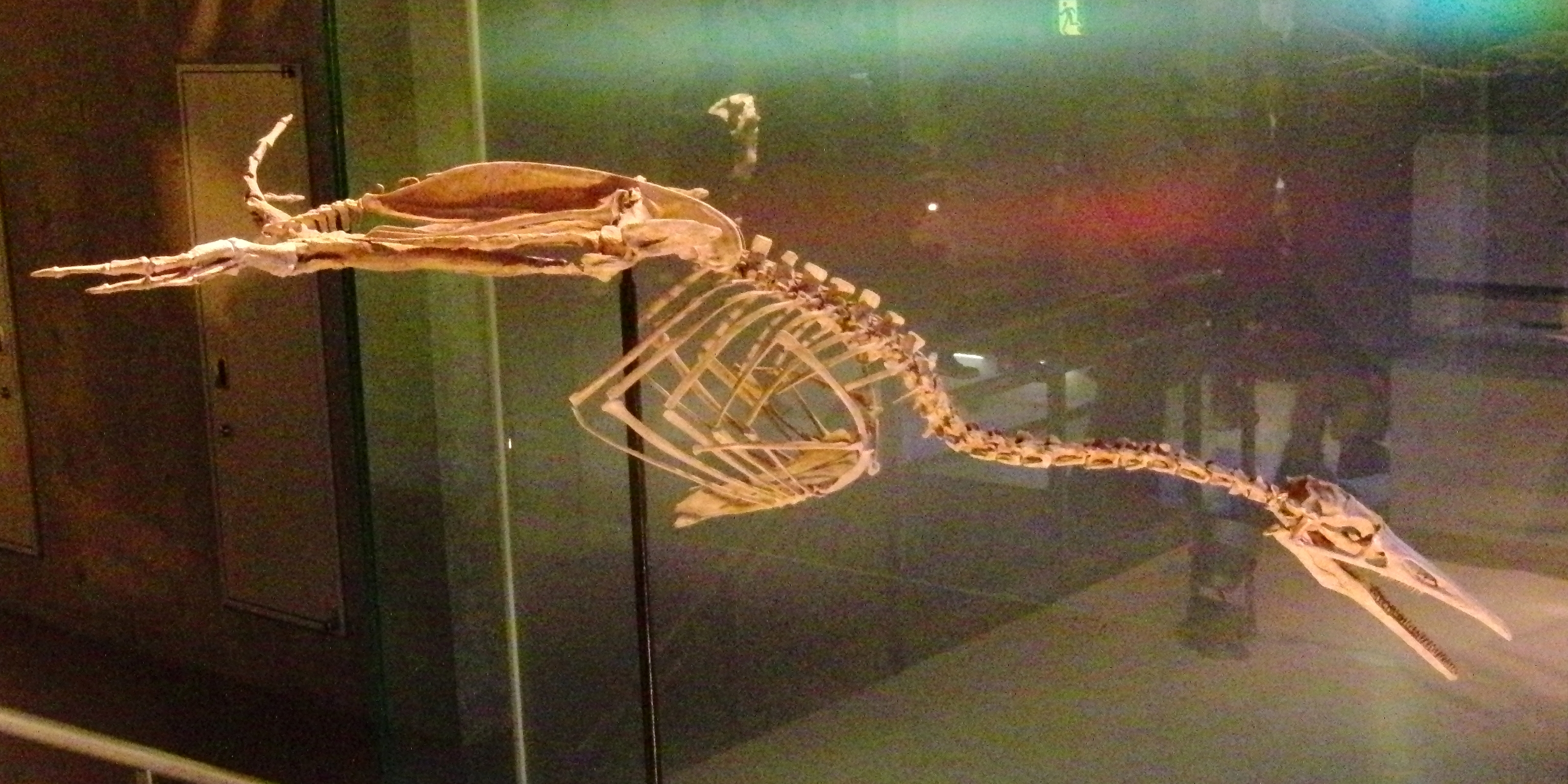
- Replica skeleton

Scientific classification
- Domain: Eukaryota
- Kingdom: Animalia
- Phylum: Chordata
- Clade: Dinosauria
- Clade: Saurischia
- Clade: Theropoda
- Clade: Avialae
- Clade: †Hesperornithes
- Family: †Hesperornithidae
- Genus: †Parahesperornis; Martin, 1984

Type species
- †Parahesperornis alexi Martin, 1984

Other species
- ?Parahesperornis bazhanovi Nessov & Prizemlin, 1991

Synonyms
- ? Asiahesperornis bazhanovi

= Parahesperornis =

Parahesperornis Temporal range: Late Cretaceous, 85–82 Ma

Extinct genus of birds

Parahesperornis is a genus of prehistoric flightless birds from the Late Cretaceous. Its range in space and time may have been extensive, but its remains are rather few and far between, at least compared with its contemporary relatives in Hesperornis. Remains are known from central North America, namely the former shallows of the Western Interior Seaway in Kansas. Found only in the upper Niobrara Chalk, these are from around the Coniacian-Santonian boundary, 85–82 million years ago (mya).

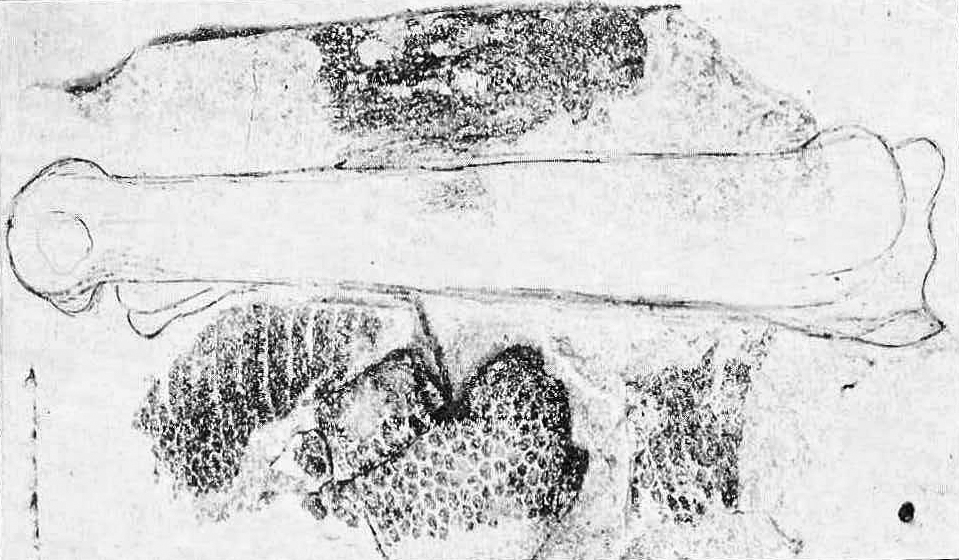
Photograph of scutes and feather impressions of the tarsal region of specimen (KUVP 2287) published by Williston (1898) in the University Geological Survey of Kansas

Parahesperornis alexi (Martin, 1984) was long lumped with specimen YPM 1478, described initially as Hesperornis gracilis and later moved to the monotypic genus Hargeria (Lucas, 1903). It then turned out that this genus' description actually referred to specimen KUVP 2287, which eventually became the holotype of P. alexi. Nonetheless, the taxon description of Hargeria was about "Hesperornis" gracilis exclusively, and thus despite the misidentification it applies to YPM 1478, the holotype of "H." gracilis. This mistake was rectified by later authors, who sank Hargeria back into Hesperornis.

In 2017, Asiahesperornis was considered as a possible synonym of Parahesperornis.

Parahesperornis was a member of the Hesperornithes, flightless toothed seabirds of the Cretaceous and more specifically in the main lineage, close to Hesperornis. Possibly the genus extended into the Campanian, to less than 80 mya. In any case, there are two very similar fossils from the Nemegt Formation (Maastrichtian or possibly late Campanian, around 76–66 mya), which were found at Tsagaan Kushu (Mongolia). Both are distal ends of tibiotarsi, and they seem certainly more similar to the bones of Hesperornithiformes and (due to the smallish size) to Parahesperornis specifically. However, they are not very diagnostic regardless, and the diversity of Parahesperornis remains enigmatic.

In 2015, a species-level phylogenetic analysis found the following relationships among hesperornitheans.

- Hesperornithes
  - Pasquiaornis
  - - Enaliornis
    - - Baptornithidae
        - AMNH 5101
        - FMNH 395
        - Baptornis advenus
      - - Brodavidae
          - Brodavis varneri
          - Brodavis baileyi
        - - Fumicollis hoffmani
          - Hesperornithidae
            - Parahesperornis alexi
            - Hesperornis
