= Sauriurae =

Subclass of birds

Sauriurae (meaning "lizard tails" in Greek) is a now-deprecated subclass of birds created by Ernst Haeckel in 1866. It was intended to include Archaeopteryx and distinguish it from all other birds then known, which he grouped in the sister-group Ornithurae ("bird tails"). The distinction Haeckel referred to in this name is that Archaeopteryx possesses a long, reptile-like tail, while all other birds known to him had short tails with few vertebrae, fused at the end into a pygostyle. The unit was not much referred to, and when Hans Friedrich Gadow in 1893 erected Archaeornithes for basically the same fossils, this became the common name for the early reptile-like grade of birds.

Ji Qiang and Larry Martin have continued to refer to the Sauriurae as a valid natural group. However, researchers like Jacques Gauthier (2001) and Julia Clarke (2002) have found that fossils found after Haeckel's time have bridged the gap between long and short-tailed Avialae. In their view, any grouping of avialans with long tails must exclude some of their descendants—making Sauriurae a paraphyletic and, thus, an invalid group under current systems of phylogenetic nomenclature.

== See also ==
- Archaeornithes
