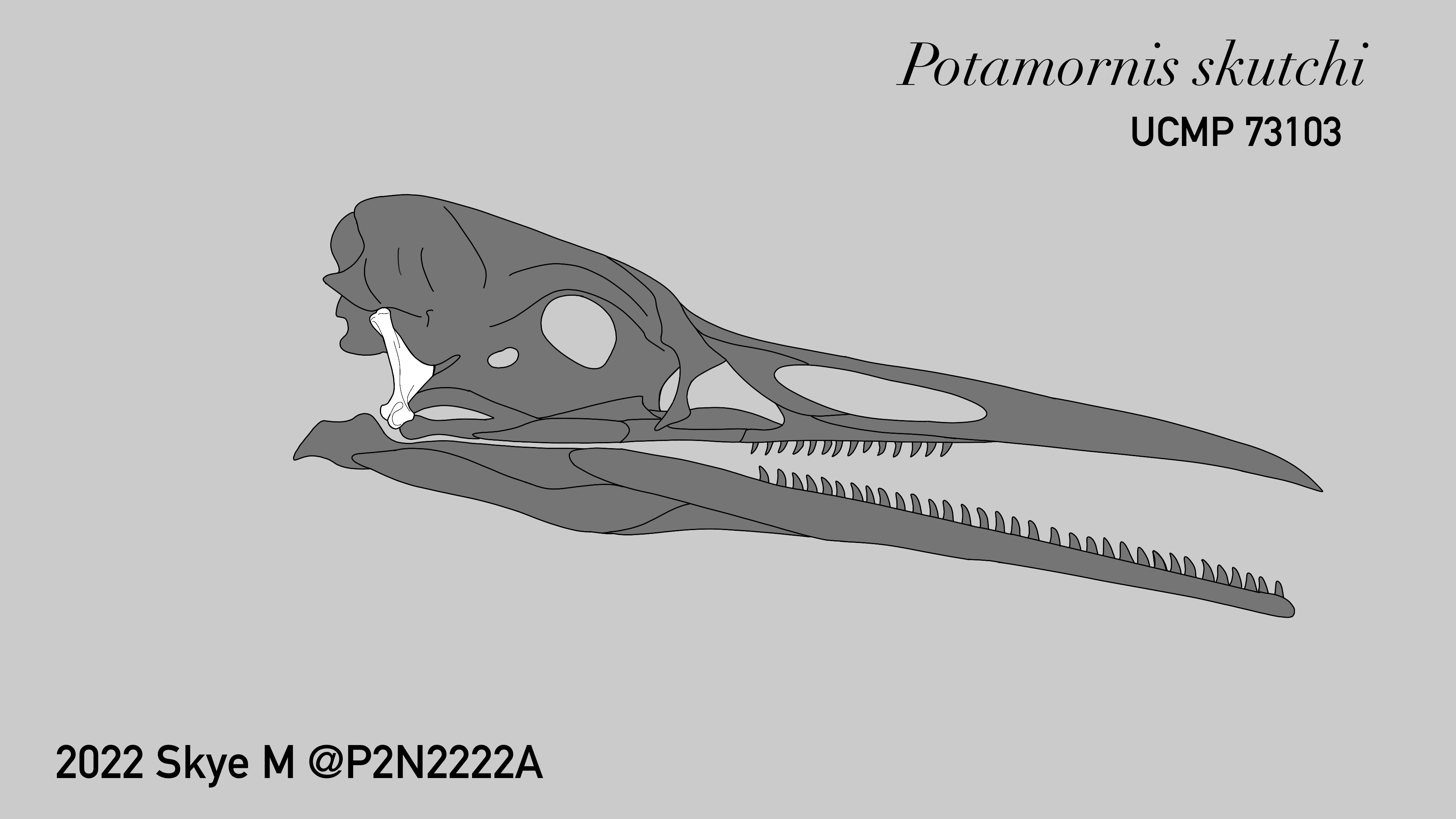

Scientific classification
- Kingdom: Animalia
- Phylum: Chordata
- Class: Reptilia
- Clade: Dinosauria
- Clade: Saurischia
- Clade: Theropoda
- Clade: Avialae
- Clade: †Hesperornithes
- Genus: †Potamornis; Elzanowski, Paul & Stidham, 2001
- Species: †P. skutchi

Binomial name
- †Potamornis skutchi Elzanowski, Paul & Stidham, 2001

= Potamornis =

Potamornis Temporal range: Late Cretaceous (Maastrichtian), 67–66 Ma

Extinct genus of birds

Potamornis is a prehistoric bird genus that dated back to the late Maastrichtian age of the late Cretaceous period. Its scrappy remains were found in the Lance Formation at Buck Creek, USA, and additional possible remains were found in the upper Hell Creek Formation of Montana, dated to the Danian age of the Paleogene period, though these may have been reworked. A single species was named and described in 2001: Potamornis skutchi.

This was almost certainly a member of the Hesperornithes, the hefty and toothed flightless diving birds of the Mesozoic seas. Its precise relationships are not all too clear; the quadrate bone is unique in some respects but apparently shares more apomorphies with the family Hesperornithidae - the "typical" Hesperornithes - in cladistic analysis. Consequently, it might be considered a fossil hesperornithid with a different feeding specialization. Though it was heavily built like many (flying and flightless) diving birds, it weighed perhaps 1.5 or 2 kg. This raises the possibility that the Hesperornithes not only included flying members (see also Enaliornis), but that their families might have evolved flightlessness independently.
