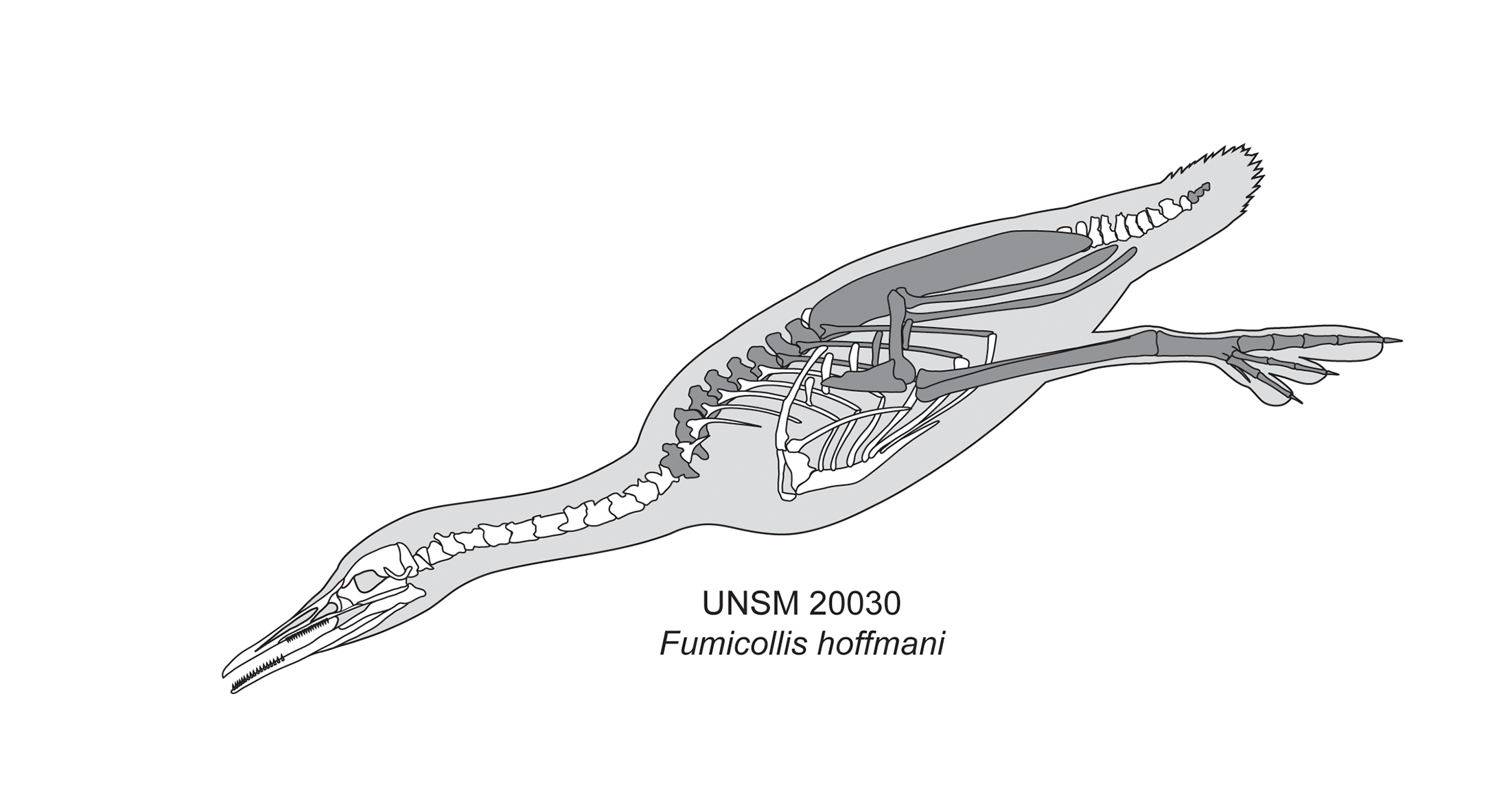
- Reconstructed Skeleton

Scientific classification
- Domain: Eukaryota
- Kingdom: Animalia
- Phylum: Chordata
- Clade: Dinosauria
- Clade: Saurischia
- Clade: Theropoda
- Clade: Avialae
- Clade: †Hesperornithes
- Family: †Hesperornithidae
- Genus: †Fumicollis; Bell and Chiappe, 2015

Type species
- †Fumicollis hoffmani Bell and Chiappe, 2015

= Fumicollis =

Fumicollis Temporal range: Late Cretaceous, 86–82 Ma

Extinct genus of birds

Fumicollis is a genus of prehistoric flightless birds from the Late Cretaceous (Coniacian-Santonian) Niobrara Chalk of Kansas.

== Description ==
Diagnostic traits of Fumicollis include presacral vertebrae with expanded ventral processes, an elongate pelvis with reduced acetabulum (acetabulum width: pelvis length is approximately 0.096 meters), a femur with expanded lateral condyle (transverse extent of condyle over 75% of midshaft width) and moderately expanded trochanter. The genus name refers to the Smoky Hill Chalk Member of the Niobrara Chalk in which it was found.

== Discovery ==
The holotype of Fumicollis, USNM 20030, was found by Harold Shepherd and George Sternberg in 1937 in the Smoky Hill Member of the Niobrara Chalk of Logan County, Kansas. Martin and Tate (1937) referred this specimen to Baptornis, also from the Niobrara Chalk. However, Bell (2013) noted a number of characters distinguishing USNM 20030 from Baptornis, and Bell and Chiappe (2015) recognized it as a distinct taxon of hesperornithiform, which they named Fumicollis hoffmani.

== Relationships ==
In 2015, a species-level phylogenetic analysis found the following relationships among hesperornitheans.

- Hesperornithes
  - Pasquiaornis
  - - Enaliornis
    - - Baptornithidae
        - AMNH 5101
        - FMNH 395
        - Baptornis advenus
      - - Brodavidae
          - Brodavis varneri
          - Brodavis baileyi
        - - Fumicollis hoffmani
          - Hesperornithidae
            - Parahesperornis alexi
            - Hesperornis
