= Pasquiaornis =

Pasquiaornis Temporal range: Late Cretaceous, 95–93 Ma

Scientific classification
- Kingdom: Animalia
- Phylum: Chordata
- Class: Reptilia
- Clade: Dinosauria
- Clade: Saurischia
- Clade: Theropoda
- Clade: Avialae
- Clade: †Hesperornithes
- Genus: †Pasquiaornis

Type species
- †Pasquiaornis hardiei Tokaryk, Cumbaa & Storer, 1997

Species
- †P. hardiei Tokaryk, Cumbaa & Storer, 1997; †P. tankei Tokaryk, Cumbaa & Storer, 1997

Extinct genus of birds

Pasquiaornis is a prehistoric seabird genus of the Hesperornithes. It lived in the Late Cretaceous, during the late Cenomanian between 95 and 93 million years ago in North America. Two species, P. hardiei and P. tankei, were described in 1997 by Tim Tokaryk, Stephen Cumbaa and John Storer.

They are known from fossils recovered near Arborfield, Saskatchewan, mostly by 1992-93 expeditions of the Royal Saskatchewan Museum and the Canadian Museum of Nature. In the description, this genus was considered closer to Baptornis advenus than to the few other Hesperornithes then known, and assigned to family Baptornithidae. Subsequently discovered relatives suggest that it is instead a quite basal member of the Hesperornithes, while Baptornis represents a distinct and somewhat more advanced lineage.

== Description ==
P.hardiei is named in honor of fossil collector Dickson Hardie, who discovered the deposits containing Pasquiaornis remains and donated his collection therefrom to science. It was described from the holotype SMNH P2077.117 (left tarsometatarsus) and paratype SMNH P2077.60 (right femur), as well as some additional pieces of either bone; a distal humerus and a presumably juvenile bird's distal tarsometatarsus end are tentatively assigned to it. P.tankei was about one-third larger, with a markedly more robust upper arm; its name honors Darren Tanke who introduced Tim Tokaryk to paleontology. Other than its holotype SMNH P2077.63 (left tarsometatarsus with damaged toe end) and paratype SMNH P2077.108 (left femur), a quadrate, a coracoid piece, some pelvis fragments, and a considerable number of more-or-less broken femur, tibiotarsus and tarsometatarsus fossils are assigned to it, as well as – tentatively – a left and a right humerus with the shoulder ends missing. Apart from size, the Pasquiaornis species differ in the angle of the femur head and the shape of the foot. The remains look closer to the corresponding bones of the more derived and mid-sized Baptornis advenus than to the large and highly apomorphic Hesperornis and Parahesperornis in shape, but even smaller and apparently retaining more plesiomorphic traits. Subsequently, abundant material of most parts of the skeleton and possibly including a third species was discovered in another deposit about 100 km away from the type locality; this has, however, as of 2024 only been described in a doctoral thesis.

== Relationships ==
The genus Pasquiaornis was a member of the Hesperornithes, toothed and generally flightless aquatic birds of the Cretaceous which were highly adapted to diving for food. Though its relationships to other members of this group are inadequately understood, Pasquiaornis appears to have been one of the most basal lineages. In some respects it resembled flying birds more than the derived Hesperornis, and the humeri assigned to the genus are not significantly reduced, with P.tankei in particular noted to have had a robust upper arm. Pasquiaornis in some regards resembles Enaliornis, a slightly older English hesperornithean genus which may have included some of the few hesperornitheans still able to fly; whether Pasquiaornis (or at least P.tankei) was still volant is unclear, but unlikely – its wing was certainly among the least-adapted to diving among the Hesperornithes, but its wing bones, though resembling those of volant birds, were notably thickened and not well suited for flying either.

In 2015, a species-level phylogenetic analysis found the following relationships among hesperornitheans, supporting the view that Pasquiaornis (and Enaliornis) are among the most ancestral known members of these unusual birds.

- Hesperornithes
  - Pasquiaornis
  - - Enaliornis
    - - Baptornithidae
        - AMNH 5101
        - FMNH 395
        - Baptornis advenus
      - - Brodavidae
          - Brodavis varneri
          - Brodavis baileyi
        - - Fumicollis hoffmani
          - Hesperornithidae
            - Parahesperornis alexi
            - Hesperornis

== Ecology ==
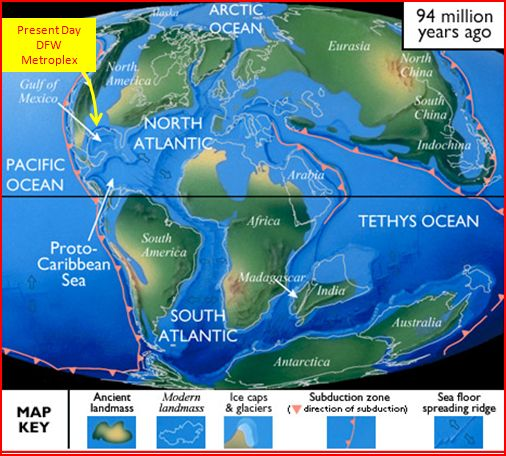
World map at the time of Pasquiaornis. The very end of the "North" of "North America" is where the fossils were found.

The remains of Pasquiaornis were found in the Carrot River valley near the Pasquia Hills, for which this genus is named. The rocks from which its fossils were recovered were assigned to the Belle Fourche Formation, formerly included in the Ashville Formation as "Belle Fourche Member"; they were deposited in the Late Cenomanian, around 94 million years ago. The birds' remains were found strewn through patchy sedimentary breccia covered by about 4 cm of bentonite (indicating a major volcanic eruption not too far away), which were probably deposited in the eastern shallows of the Western Interior Seaway in water less than 6 m deep. Abundant diatoms and land plan spores and pollen were found in the breccia, indicating a nutrient-rich warm sea with forested shores dominated by conifers and huge ferns, as well as ancient angiosperms (see also Arcto-Tertiary Geoflora). At that time, today's Manitoba Escarpment lacked its eastern slope, and to the west formed a coastline of the Western Interior Seaway, with shallow water full of sediments and plenty of islands, the exact layout varying during the marine transgressions and regressions of the Greenhorn Cycle; the jumbled assemblage of tightly packed and disassociated bones indicates that the Pasquiaornis deposits were formed during a period of sinking sea levels, when stretches of coastal waters were cut off from the sea and dried up, and the associated wave action and digging seafloor fauna moved the fossils from their original place of deposition to collect in patches that eventually turned to breccia.

Like its relatives, these birds probably fed on fish and marine invertebrates, for which they dived in the Western Interior Seaway. The remains referenced in the description encompass at least 3 P.hardiei and 6 P.tankei, found in a fairly limited area, suggesting either mass mortality of a fairly common bird, or nearby breeding colonies that accumulated remains of dead birds over a prolonged time. FHSM VP-6318, a broken hesperornithean tarsometatarsus from Kansas' Lincoln Limestone Member (lowest Greenhorn Formation) – supposedly resembling Enaliornis and coeval with Pasquiaornis –, was not found to be similar to the latter upon inspection. This indicates that at least one other hesperornithean probably coexisted with the Pasquiaornis species.
