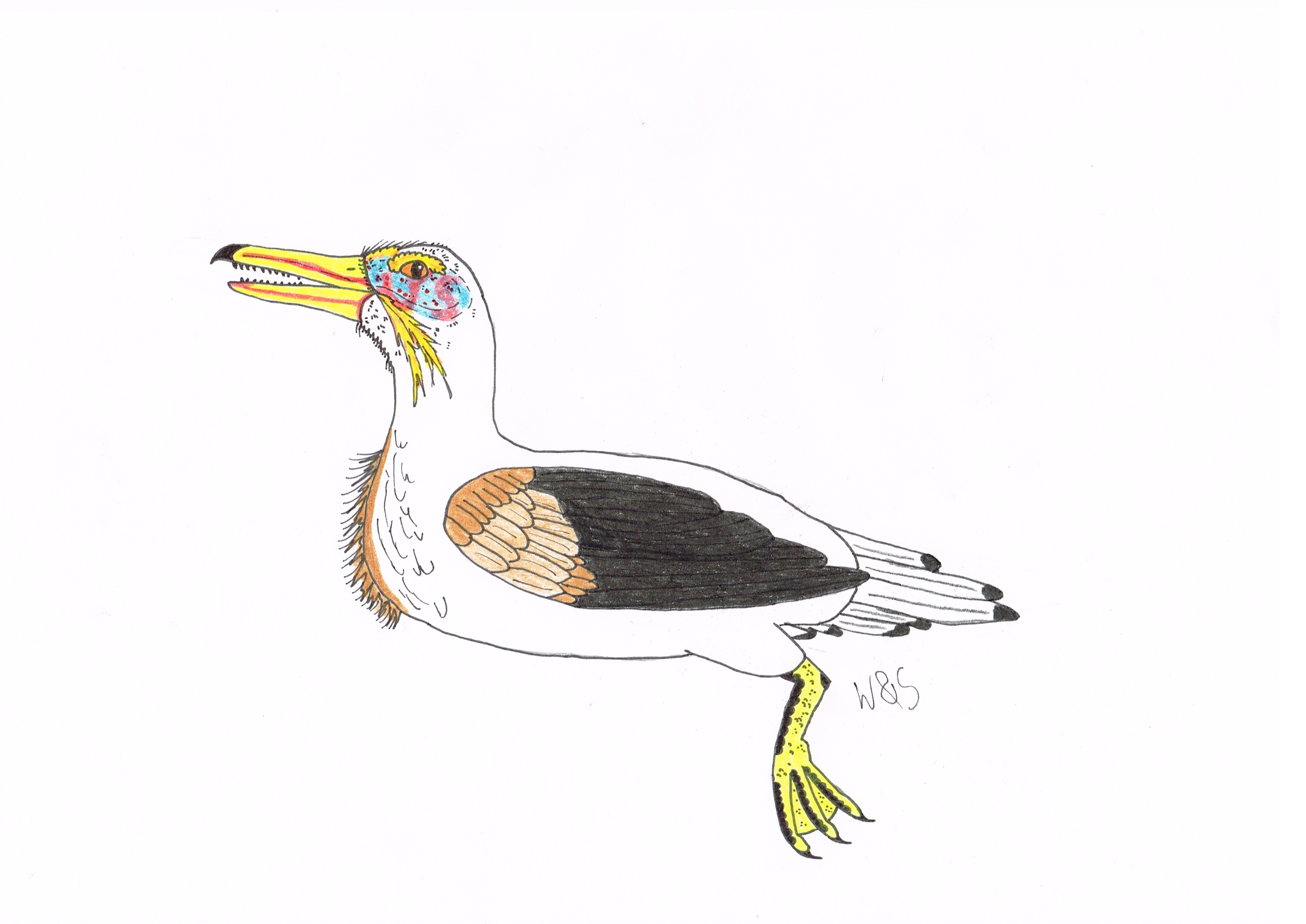
- Life restoration of Brodavis mongoliensis

Scientific classification
- Kingdom: Animalia
- Phylum: Chordata
- Class: Reptilia
- Clade: Dinosauria
- Clade: Saurischia
- Clade: Theropoda
- Clade: Avialae
- Clade: †Hesperornithes
- Family: †Brodavidae; Martin et al., 2012
- Genus: †Brodavis; Martin et al., 2012

Type species
- †Brodavis americanus Martin et al., 2012

Species
- †B. americanus Martin et al., 2012; †B. baileyi Martin et al., 2012; †B. mongoliensis Martin et al., 2012; †B. varneri (Martin & Cordes-Person, 2007)

= Brodavis =

Brodavis Temporal range: Late Cretaceous, 80.5–66 Ma

Extinct genus of birds

Brodavis is a genus of freshwater hesperornithiform birds known from the Late Cretaceous (possibly Campanian and Maastrichtian stage) of North America and Asia. It was first described and named by Larry D. Martin, Evgeny N. Kurochkin and Tim T. Tokaryk in 2012 and assigned to a new monogeneric family, Brodavidae. Four species were described and assigned to Brodavis.

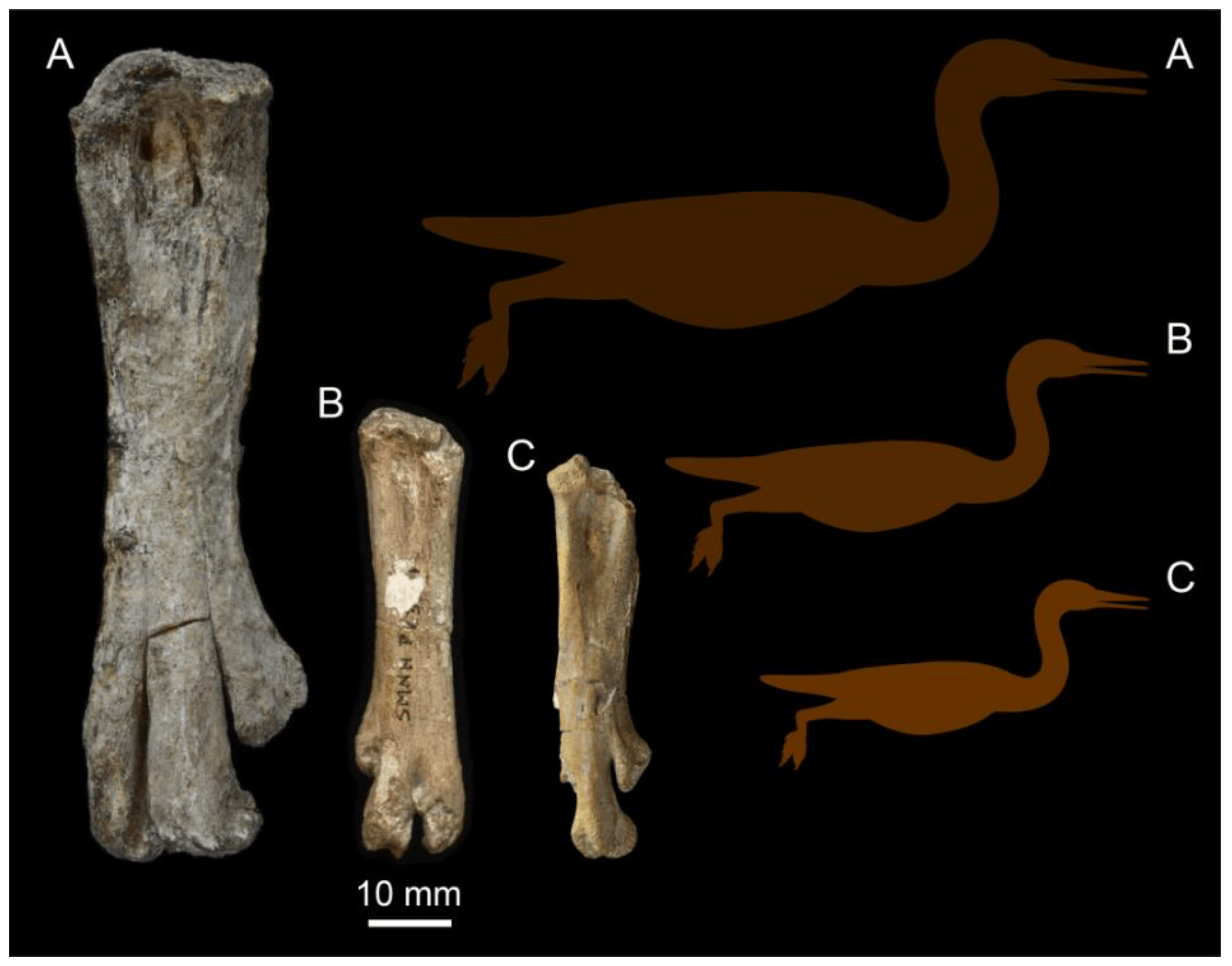
Size comparison of the tarsometatarsus of B. varneri (A), B. americanus (B), and B.baileyi (C)

The type species, B. americanus, is known from the holotype left metatarsal, RSM P 2315.1 which was collected in the Maastrichtian-age Frenchman Formation of Canada.

B. baileyi is known from the holotype left metatarsal, UNSM 50665, which was collected in the Maastrichtian-age Hell Creek Formation of South Dakota, United States (dated to between 66.8 and 66 Ma ago)

B. mongoliensis is known from the holotype left metatarsal, PIN 4491-8, which was collected in the Maastrichtian-age Nemegt Formation of Mongolia.

B. varneri was originally named as a second species of Baptornis by James Martin and Amanda Cordes-Person in 2007. It is based on the holotype left tarsometatarsal SDSM 68430 which was collected in the Campanian-age Sharon Springs Formation, lower Pierre Shale of southwestern South Dakota (dated to between 81.5 and 80.5 million years ago.). "Baptornis" varneri might represent a fourth species of Brodavis or belong to a separate genus.

Brodavis is considered to be the first freshwater and latest record of the order Hesperornithiformes. Although hesperornithiforms probably lost their flight abilities by the end of the Early Cretaceous, minimal pachyostosis in Brodavis suggests the possibility of some volant abilities.

In 2015, a species-level phylogenetic analysis found the following relationships among hesperornitheans.

- Hesperornithes
  - Pasquiaornis
  - - Enaliornis
    - - Baptornithidae
        - AMNH 5101
        - FMNH 395
        - Baptornis advenus
      - - Brodavidae
          - Brodavis varneri
          - Brodavis baileyi
        - - Fumicollis hoffmani
          - Hesperornithidae
            - Parahesperornis alexi
            - Hesperornis
