= Canadaga =

Canadaga Temporal range: Late Cretaceous, 83.6–67 Ma

Scientific classification
- Kingdom: Animalia
- Phylum: Chordata
- Class: Reptilia
- Clade: Dinosauria
- Clade: Saurischia
- Clade: Theropoda
- Clade: Avialae
- Clade: †Hesperornithes
- Family: †Hesperornithidae
- Genus: †Canadaga; Hou, 1999
- Species: †C. arctica

Binomial name
- †Canadaga arctica Hou, 1999

Extinct genus of birds

Canadaga (meaning "Canadian bird") is a flightless bird genus from the Late Cretaceous. The single known species is Canadaga arctica. It lived in the shallow seas around what today is Bylot and Devon Islands in Nunavut, Canada. Its fossils were found in rocks dated to the Campanian to mid-Maastrichtian age, about 67 million years ago. It was found in the Kanguk Formation

It was a member of the Hesperornithes, flightless toothed seabirds of the Cretaceous. Among these, it belonged to the Hesperornithidae, along with Hesperornis, the well-known namesake genus.

== Description ==
C. arctica is one of the largest known members of the Hesperornithes, reaching a length of 2.2 metres (7.2 ft). It also represents one of the last known members of the lineage. Unlike its relatives which are mainly known from subtropical or tropical waters, this species seems to have ranged in temperate or even subarctic areas.

The species is described from three associated cervical vertebrae, one caudal vertebra and two femurs.
