= Enaliornis =

Enaliornis Temporal range: 100.5 Ma

Scientific classification
- Kingdom: Animalia
- Phylum: Chordata
- Class: Reptilia
- Clade: Dinosauria
- Clade: Saurischia
- Clade: Theropoda
- Clade: Avialae
- Clade: †Hesperornithes
- Family: †Enaliornithidae
- Genus: †Enaliornis; Seeley, 1876

Type species
- †Enaliornis barretti Seeley, 1876

Species
- †Enaliornis barretti Seeley, 1876; †Enaliornis sedgwicki Seeley, 1876; †Enaliornis seeleyi Galton & Martin, 2002

Extinct genus of birds

Enaliornis is a genus of hesperornithine which lived during the late Albian to the early Cenomanian, making them the oldest known hesperornithines. Fossils have been found near Cambridge, England. Due to its lack of certain hesperornithid apomorphies, they were much more "conventional" birds and were initially held to be Gaviiformes (loons/divers).

== Description ==
Based on the remnants that have been studied, it has not been determined if these birds had teeth like the others from this order. However, they were believed to not have well-developed wings. Like other hesperornithines, they probably had lobed feet for swimming, rather than webbed feet.

== Classification ==
Enaliornis was originally named Pelagornis ("sea bird") by Seeley in 1866, but that name was preoccupied by a Miocene bird related to the pelicans. Three species have been described: the small Enaliornis sedgwicki, the medium-sized Enaliornis seeleyi, and the large Enaliornis barretti.

The size of the largest of the three species was comparable to a large pigeon. Together, they are the only birds currently assigned to the family Enaliornithidae. The presumed hesperornithine Potamornis from the Late Cretaceous Lance Formation of Buck Creek (United States) may also be related to this group.

=== Relationships ===
In 2015, a species-level phylogenetic analysis found the following relationships among hesperornitheans.

- Hesperornithes
  - Pasquiaornis
  - - Enaliornis
    - - Baptornithidae
        - AMNH 5101
        - FMNH 395
        - Baptornis advenus
      - - Brodavidae
          - Brodavis varneri
          - Brodavis baileyi
        - - Fumicollis hoffmani
          - Hesperornithidae
            - Parahesperornis alexi
            - Hesperornis

== Sources ==
- Brands, Sheila (7 Apr 2012). "Taxon: Genus †Enaliornis". Project: The Taxonomicon. Archived from the original on 2014-02-21.
- Harrison, C.J.O.; Walker, C.A. (1973). "Wyleyia: a new bird humerus from the Lower Cretaceous of England" (PDF). Palaeontology. 16 (4): 721–728. Archived from the original on 2012-02-06.
- Perrins, Christopher (1987) [1979]. Harrison, C.J.O. (ed.). Birds: Their Lifes, Their Ways, Their World. Reader's Digest Association, Inc. p. 166. ISBN 0895770652.
