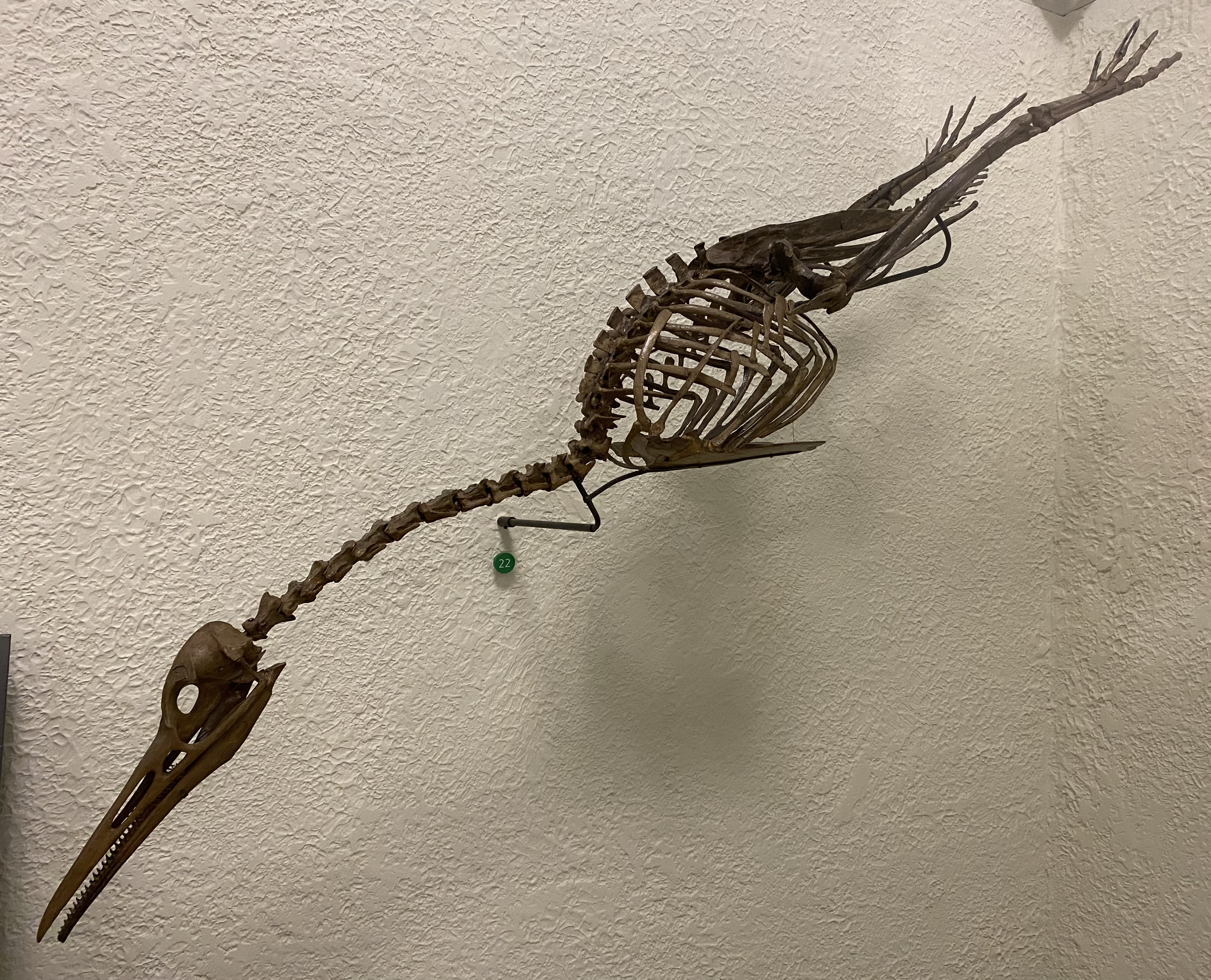
- Restored skeleton of H. regalis in diving posture at the American Museum of Natural History

Scientific classification
- Kingdom: Animalia
- Phylum: Chordata
- Class: Reptilia
- Clade: Dinosauria
- Clade: Saurischia
- Clade: Theropoda
- Clade: Avialae
- Clade: †Hesperornithes
- Family: †Hesperornithidae
- Genus: †Hesperornis; Marsh, 1872

Type species
- †Hesperornis regalis Marsh, 1872

Species
- †H. regalis Marsh, 1872 †H. crassipes (Marsh, 1876) †H. gracilis Marsh, 1876 †H. altus (Marsh, 1893) †H. montana Schufeldt, 1915 †H. rossicus Nesov & Yarkov, 1993 †H. bairdi Martin & Lim, 2002 †H. chowi Martin & Lim, 2002 †H. macdonaldi Martin & Lim, 2002 †H. mengeli Martin & Lim, 2002 †H. lumgairi Aotsuka & Sato, 2016

Synonyms
- Lestornis Marsh, 1876; Coniornis Marsh, 1893; Hargeria Lucas, 1903

= Hesperornis =

Hesperornis Temporal range: Late Cretaceous (Campanian), 83.6–72 Ma Possible early Maastrichtian record

Extinct genus of birds

Hesperornis (from Ancient Greek ἕσπερος (hésperos), meaning "western", and ὄρνις (órnis), meaning "bird") is a genus of cormorant-like ornithuran that spanned throughout the Campanian age, and possibly even up to the early Maastrichtian age, of the Late Cretaceous period. One of the lesser-known discoveries of the paleontologist O. C. Marsh in the late 19th century Bone Wars, it was an early find in the history of avian paleontology. Locations for Hesperornis fossils include the Late Cretaceous marine limestones from Kansas and the marine shales from Canada. Nine species are recognised, eight of which have been recovered from rocks in North America and one from Russia.

== Description ==
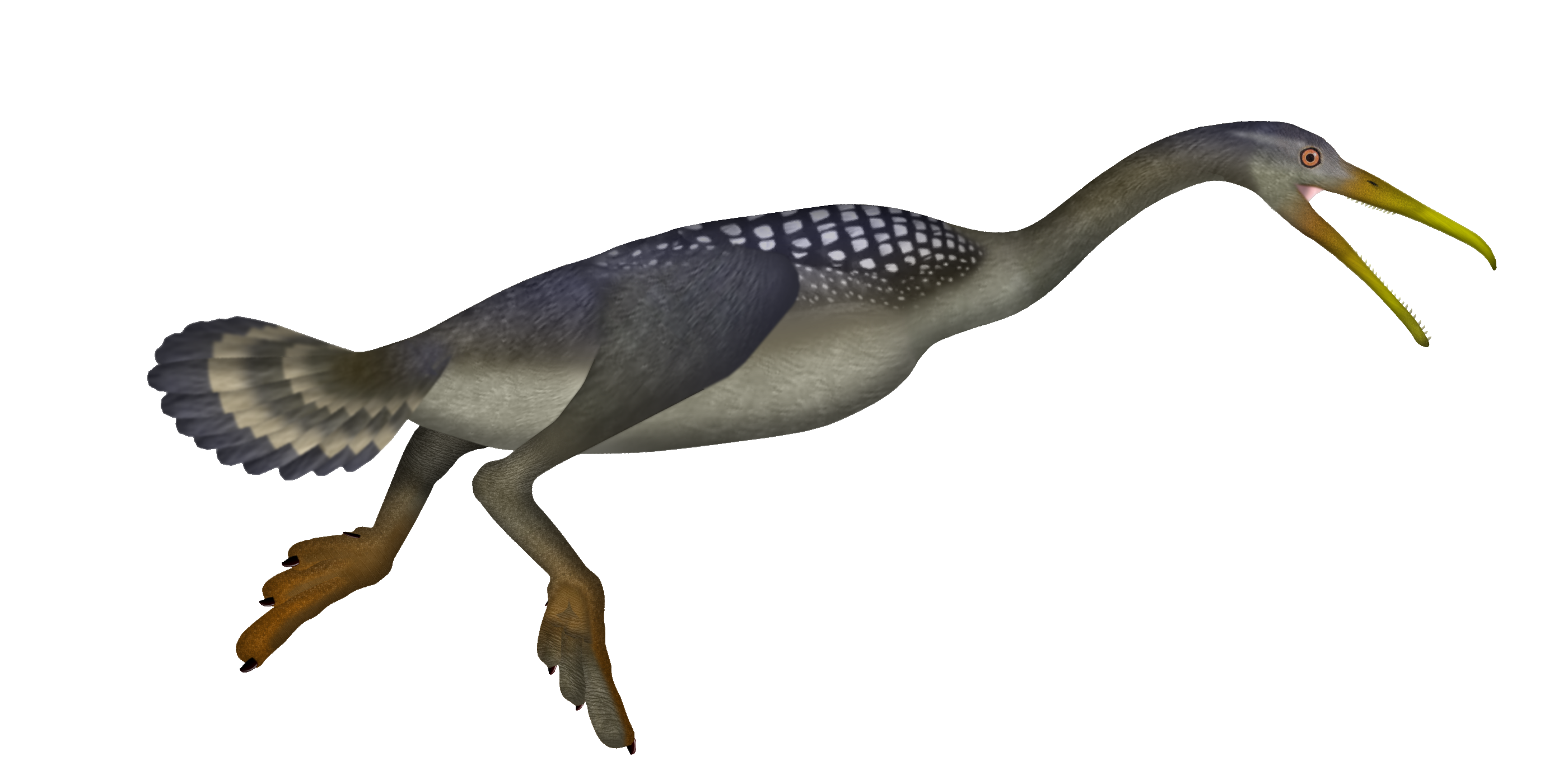
Life restoration

Hesperornis was a large bird, measuring about 1.5–2 metres (4.9–6.6 ft) long and weighing around 10.6 kilograms (23 lb). It had virtually no wings, and swam with its powerful hind legs. Studies on the feet initially indicated that Hesperornis and kin had lobed toes similar to modern-day grebes, as opposed to webbed toes as seen in most aquatic birds such as loons. More recent work looking at the morphometrics of the feet in hesperornithiformes and modern sea birds has thrown this interpretation into question, making webbed toes equally as likely as lobed toes for this group.

Like many other Mesozoic birds such as Ichthyornis, Hesperornis had teeth as well as a beak. In the hesperornithiform lineage they were of a different arrangement than in any other known bird (or in non-avian theropod dinosaurs), with the teeth sitting in a longitudinal groove rather than in individual sockets, in a notable case of convergent evolution with mosasaurs. The teeth of Hesperornis were present along nearly the entire lower jaw (dentary) and the back of the upper jaw (maxilla). The front portion of the upper jaw (premaxilla) and tip of the lower jaw (predentary) lacked teeth and were probably covered in a beak. Studies of the bone surface show that at least the tips of the jaws supported a hard, keratinous beak similar to that found in modern birds. The palate (mouth roof) contained small pits that allowed the lower teeth to lock into place when the jaws were closed. They also retained a primitive-like joint between the lower jaw bones. It is believed that this allowed them to rotate the back portion of the mandible independently of the front, thus allowing the lower teeth to disengage.

== History ==
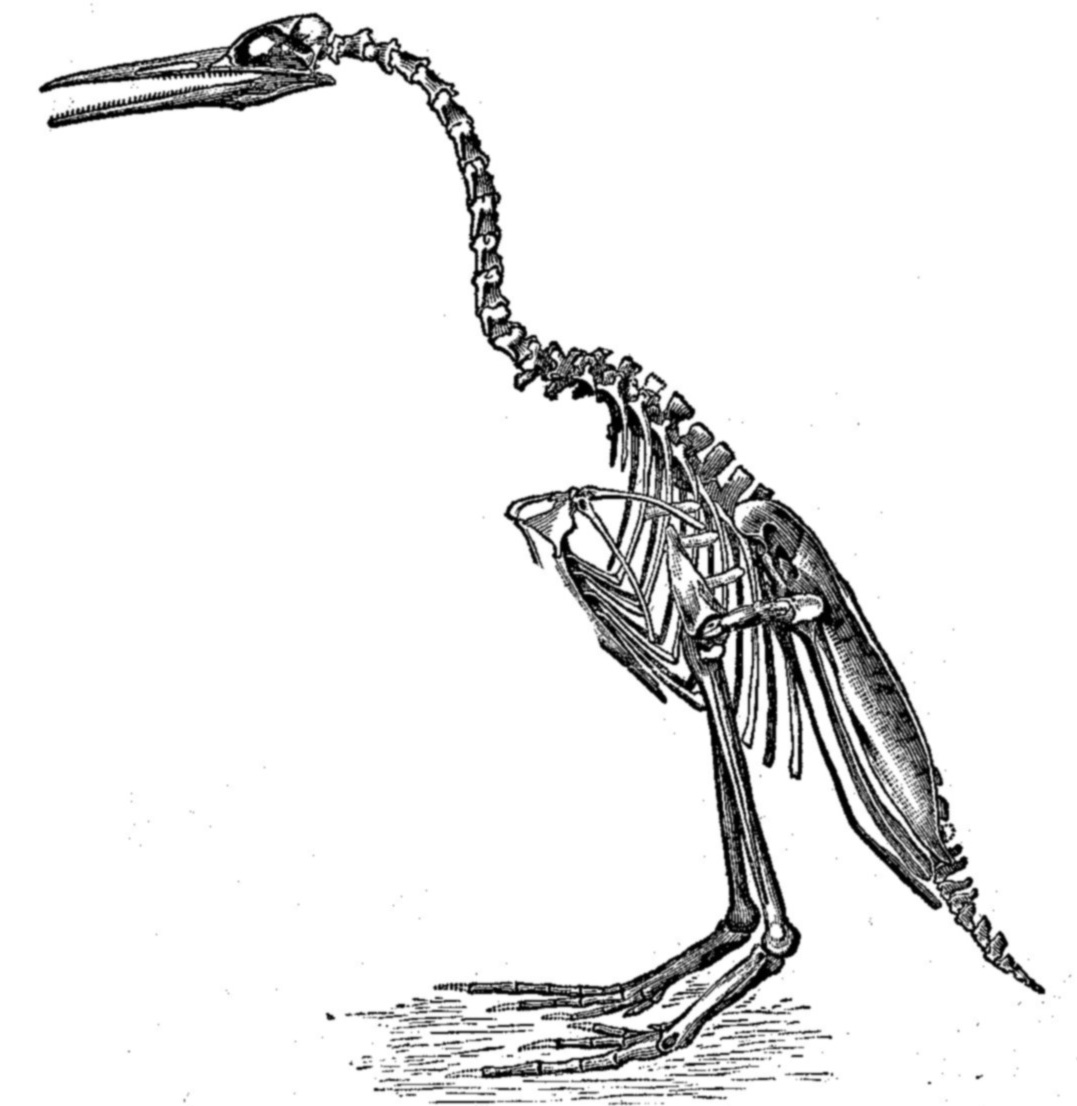
Marsh's now-obsolete 1880 reconstruction of H. regalis

The first Hesperornis specimen was discovered in 1871 by Othniel Charles Marsh. Marsh was undertaking his second western expedition, accompanied by ten students. The team headed to Kansas where Marsh had dug before. Aside from finding more bones belonging to the flying reptile Pteranodon, Marsh discovered the skeleton of a "large fossil bird, at least five feet in height". The specimen was large, wingless, and had strong legs—Marsh considered it a diving species. Unfortunately, the specimen lacked a head. Marsh named the find Hesperornis regalis, or "regal western bird".

Marsh headed back west with a smaller party the following year. In western Kansas, one of Marsh's four students, Thomas H. Russell, discovered a "nearly perfect skeleton" of Hesperornis. This specimen had enough of its head intact that Marsh could see that the creature's jaws had been lined with teeth. Marsh saw important evolutionary implications of this find, along with Benjamin Mudge's find of the toothed bird Ichthyornis. In an 1873 paper Marsh declared that "the fortunate discovery of these interesting fossils does much to break down the old distinction between Birds and Reptiles". Meanwhile, Marsh's relationship with his rival Edward Drinker Cope soured further after Cope accidentally received boxes of fossils, including the toothed birds, that were meant for Marsh. Cope called the birds "simply delightful", but Marsh replied with accusations Cope had stolen the bones. By 1873 their friendship dissolved into open hostility, helping to spark the Bone Wars. While Marsh would rarely go into the field after 1873, the collectors he paid continued to send him a stream of fossils. He eventually received parts of 50 specimens of Hesperornis, which allowed him to make a much stronger demonstration of an evolutionary link between reptiles and birds than had been possible before.

== Classification and Species ==
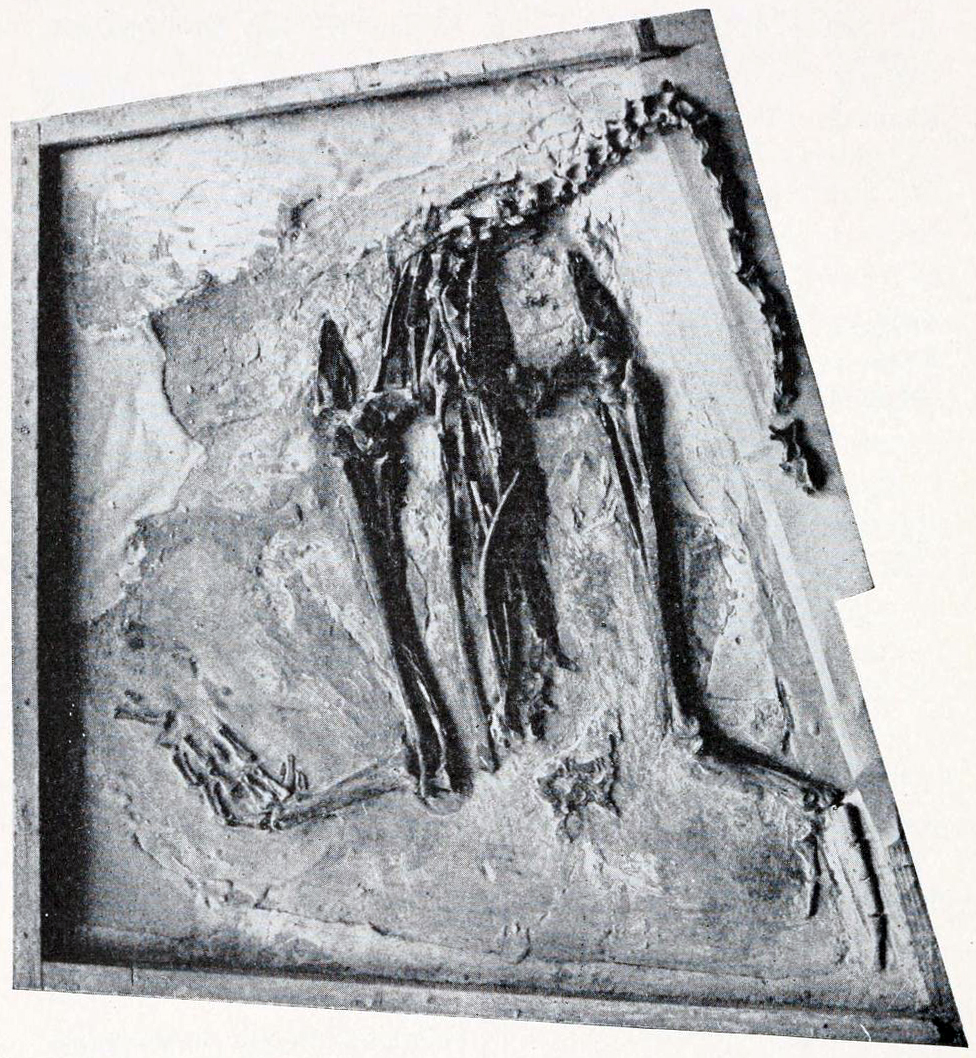
H. regalis specimen at the AMNH

Many species have been described in this genus, though some are known from very few bones or even a single bone and cannot be properly compared with the more plentiful (but also incomplete) remains of other similar-sized taxa. In many cases, species have been separated by provenance, having been found in strata of different ages or in different locations, or by differences in size.

The first species to be described, the type species, is Hesperornis regalis. H. regalis is also the best known species, and dozens of specimens (from fragments to more complete skeletons) have been recovered, all from the Smoky Hill Chalk Member of the Niobrara Formation (dating to the early Campanian age, between 90 and 70 million years ago). It is the only species of Hesperornis for which a nearly complete skull is known.

Hesperornis crassipes was named in 1876 by Marsh, who initially classified it in a different genus as Lestornis crassipes. H. crassipes was larger than H. regalis, had five ribs as opposed to four in the first species, and differed in aspects of the bone sculpturing on the breastbone and lower leg. H. crassipes is known from the same time and place as H. regalis. One incomplete skeleton is known, including teeth and parts of the skull.

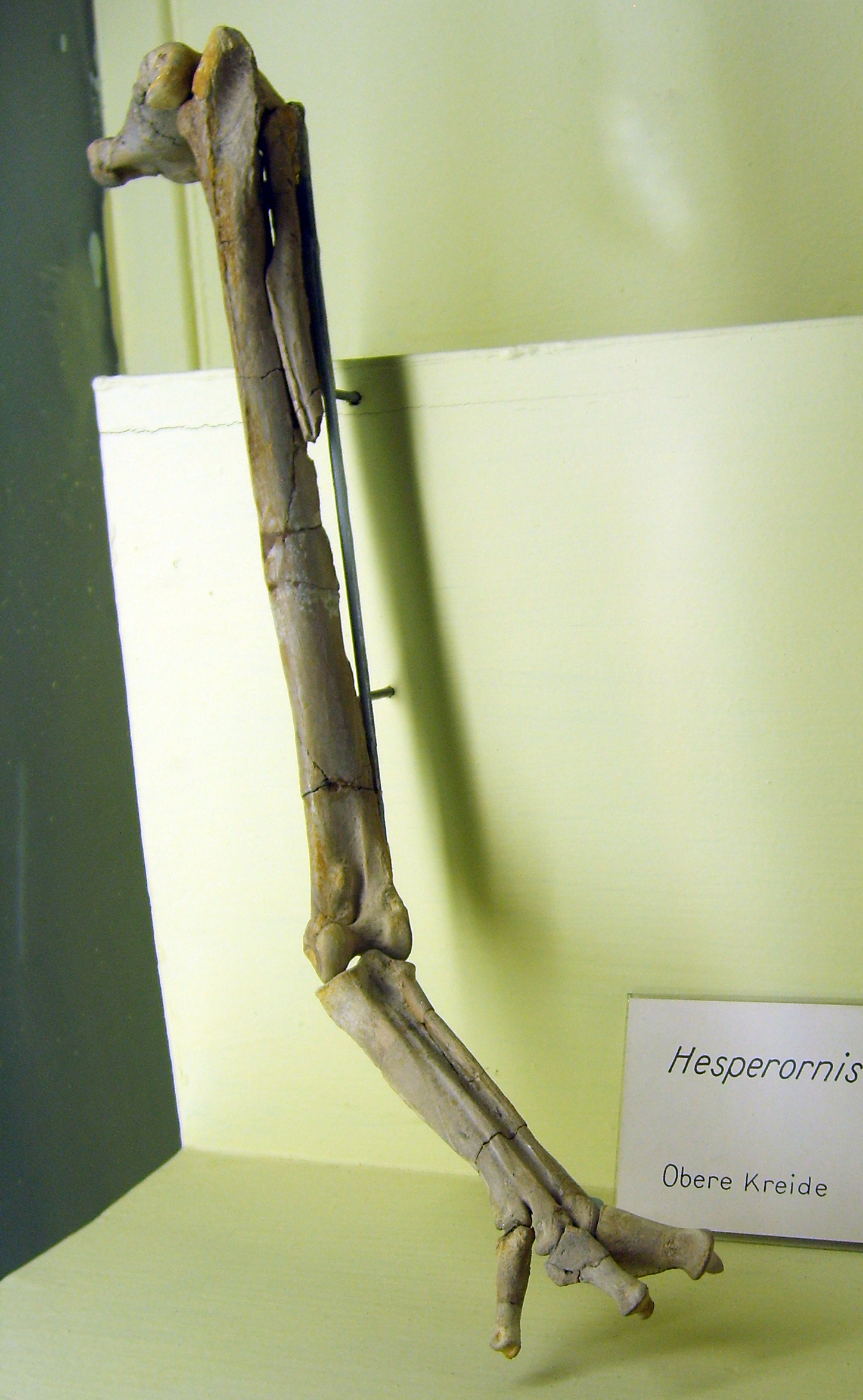
Left leg of H. gracilis

Marsh explicitly named his second species of Hesperornis in 1876 for an incomplete metatarsus recovered from the same layers of the Niobrara chalk as H. regalis. He named this smaller species H. gracilis, and it was subsequently involved in the rather confused taxonomy of a specimen which would eventually form the basis of the new genus and species Parahesperornis alexi. The type specimen of P. alexi was assumed to belong to the same specimen as that of H. gracilis, so when Lucas (1903) decided that the former specimen represented a distinct genus, he mistakenly used the later specimen to anchor it, creating the name Hargeria gracilis. This mistake was rectified by later authors, who sank Hargeria back into Hesperornis and renamed the more distinctive specimen Parahesperornis.

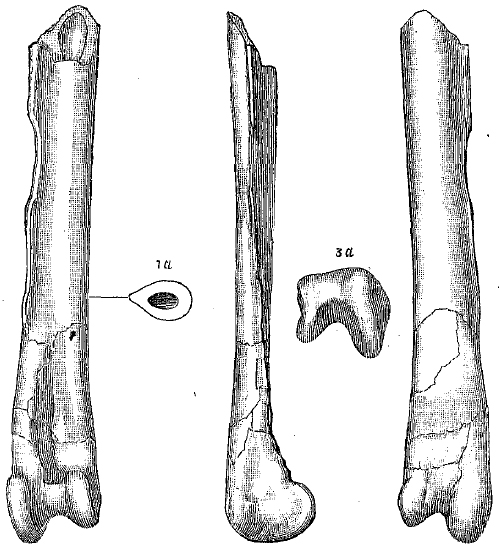
Type specimen (a partial right tibia) of H. altus in several views

The first species recognized from outside the Niobrara chalk, Hesperornis altus, lived about 78 million years ago in Montana, and is known from a partial lower leg from the base of the freshwater Judith River Formation (or, possibly, the top of the underlying, marine Claggett Shale formation). While initially placed in the new genus Coniornis by Marsh, this was due mostly to his belief that Hesperornis existed only in Kansas, so any species from Montana should be placed in a different genus. Most later researchers disagreed with this, and have placed Coniornis altus in the same genus as Hesperornis as H. altus. A second species from Montana has also been described from the Claggett Shale. H. montana was named by Shufeldt in 1915, and while its known material (a single dorsal vertebra) cannot be directly compared to H. altus, Shufeldt and others have considered it distinct due to its apparently smaller size.

In 1993, the first Hesperornis remains from outside of North America were recognized as a new species by Nessov and Yarkov. They named Hesperornis rossicus for a fragmentary skeleton from the early Campanian of Russia near Volgograd. Several other specimens from contemporary deposits have since been referred to this species. At about 1.4 metres (4.6 ft) long, H. rossicus was the largest species of Hesperornis and among the largest hesperornithines, slightly smaller than the large Canadian genus Canadaga. Aside from its large size and different geographic location, H. rossicus differs from other Hesperornis in several features of the lower leg and foot, including a highly flattened metatarsus.

In 2002, Martin and Lim formally recognized several new species for remains that had previously been unstudied or referred without consideration to previously named North American hesperornithines. These include the very small H. mengeli and H. macdonaldi, the slightly larger H. bairdi, and the very large H. chowi, all from the Sharon Springs member of the Pierre Shale Formation in South Dakota and Alberta, 80.5 million years ago.

In addition, there are some unassigned remains, such as SGU 3442 Ve02 and LO 9067t and bones of an undetermined species from Tzimlyanskoe Reservoir near Rostov. The former two bones are probably H. rossicus; some remains assigned to that species in turn seem to belong to the latter undetermined taxon. It is also suggested that Hesperornis likely lived throughout the Campanian age based on remains found on middle to late Campanian age rocks, and possibly even up to the early Maastrichtian age.

=== Relationships ===
In 2015, a species-level phylogenetic analysis found the following relationships among hesperornitheans.

- Hesperornithes
  - Pasquiaornis
  - - Enaliornis
    - - Baptornithidae
        - AMNH 5101
        - FMNH 395
        - Baptornis advenus
      - - Brodavidae
          - Brodavis varneri
          - Brodavis baileyi
        - - Fumicollis hoffmani
          - Hesperornithidae
            - Parahesperornis alexi
            - Hesperornis

== Paleobiology ==
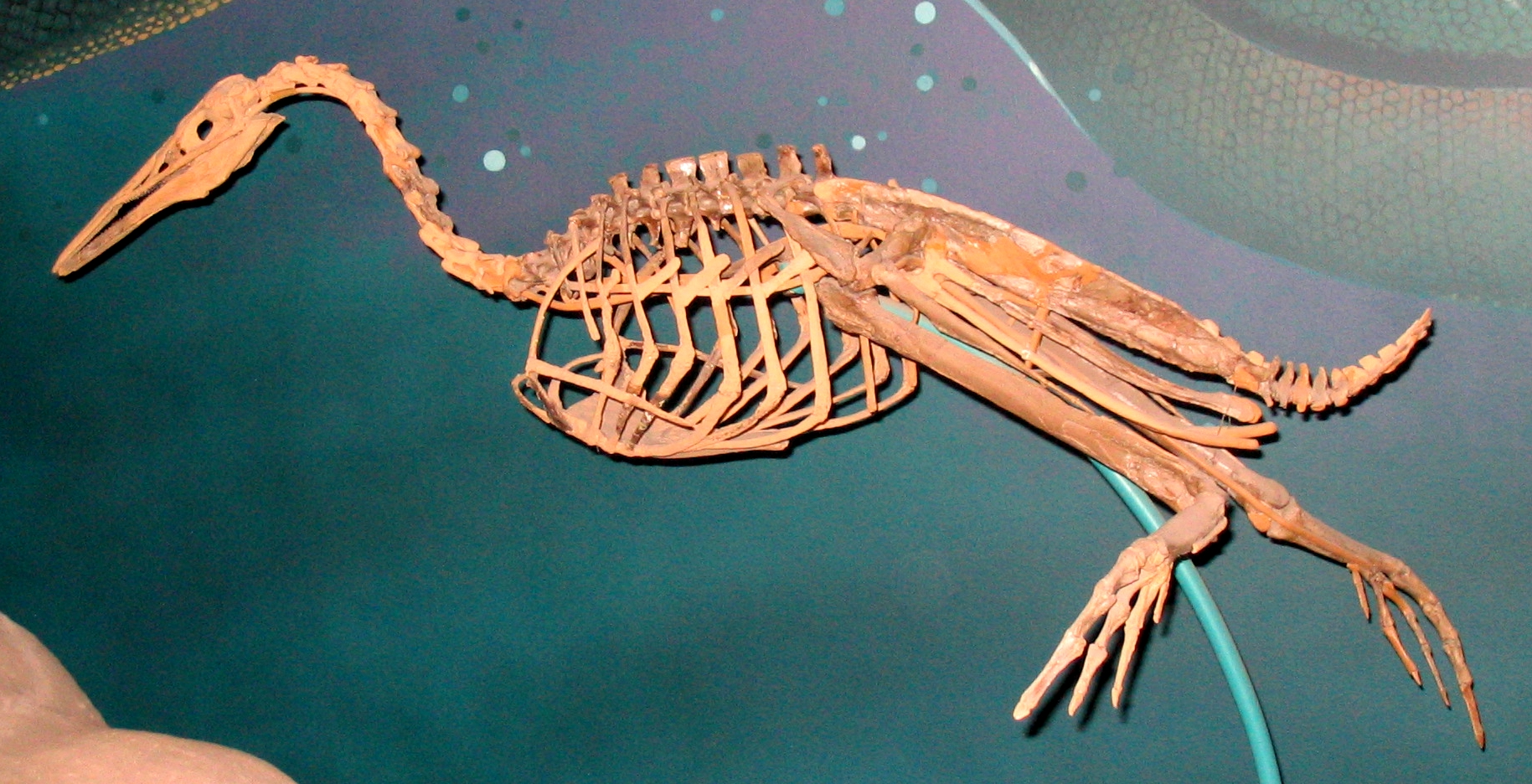
H. regalis skeleton in swimming pose; note feet pointing sideways

Hesperornis was primarily marine, and lived in the waters of such contemporary shallow shelf seas as the Western Interior Seaway, the Turgai Strait, and the North Sea, which then were subtropical to tropical waters, much warmer than today. However, some of the youngest known specimens of Hesperornis have been found in inland freshwater deposits of the Foremost Formation, suggesting that some species of Hesperornis may have eventually moved, at least partially, away from a primarily marine habitat. Additionally, the species H. altus comes from the freshwater deposits at the base of the Judith River Formation.

Traditionally, Hesperornis is depicted with a mode of locomotion similar to modern loons or grebes, and study of their limb proportions and hip structure has borne out this comparison. In terms of limb length, shape of the hip bones, and position of the hip socket, Hesperornis is particularly similar to the common loon (Gavia immer), probably exhibiting a very similar manner of locomotion on land and in water. Like loons, Hesperornis were probably excellent foot-propelled divers, but might have been ungainly on land. Whereas its tibiotarsus moved like that of a loon while propelling Hesperornis through water, its toes moved and functioned more like those of a grebe while undergoing propulsion in water. Like loons, the legs were probably encased inside the body wall up to the ankle, causing the feet to jut out to the sides near the tail. This would have prevented them from bringing the legs underneath the body to stand, or under the center of gravity to walk. Instead, they likely moved on land by pushing themselves along on their bellies, like modern seals. However, more recent studies on hesperornithean hindlimbs suggest they were more functionally similar to those of the still upright walking cormorants.

Young Hesperornis grew fairly quickly and continuously to adulthood, as is the case in modern birds, but not Enantiornithes.

=== Pathology ===
A Hesperornis leg bone uncovered in the 1960s was examined by David Burnham, Bruce Rothschild et al. and was found to bear bite marks from a young polycotylid plesiosaur (possibly a Dolichorhynchops or something similar). The Hesperornis bone, specifically the condyle, shows signs of infection, indicating the bird survived the initial attack and escaped the predator. The discovery was published in the journal Cretaceous Research in 2016.

== Sources ==
- Thomson, Keith Stewart (2008). The Legacy of the Mastodon: The Golden Age of Fossils in America. Yale University Press. ISBN 978-0-300-11704-2.
- Wallace, David Rains (1999). The Bonehunters' Revenge: Dinosaurs, Greed, and the Greatest Scientific Feud of the Gilded Age. Houghton Mifflin Books. ISBN 0-618-08240-9.
