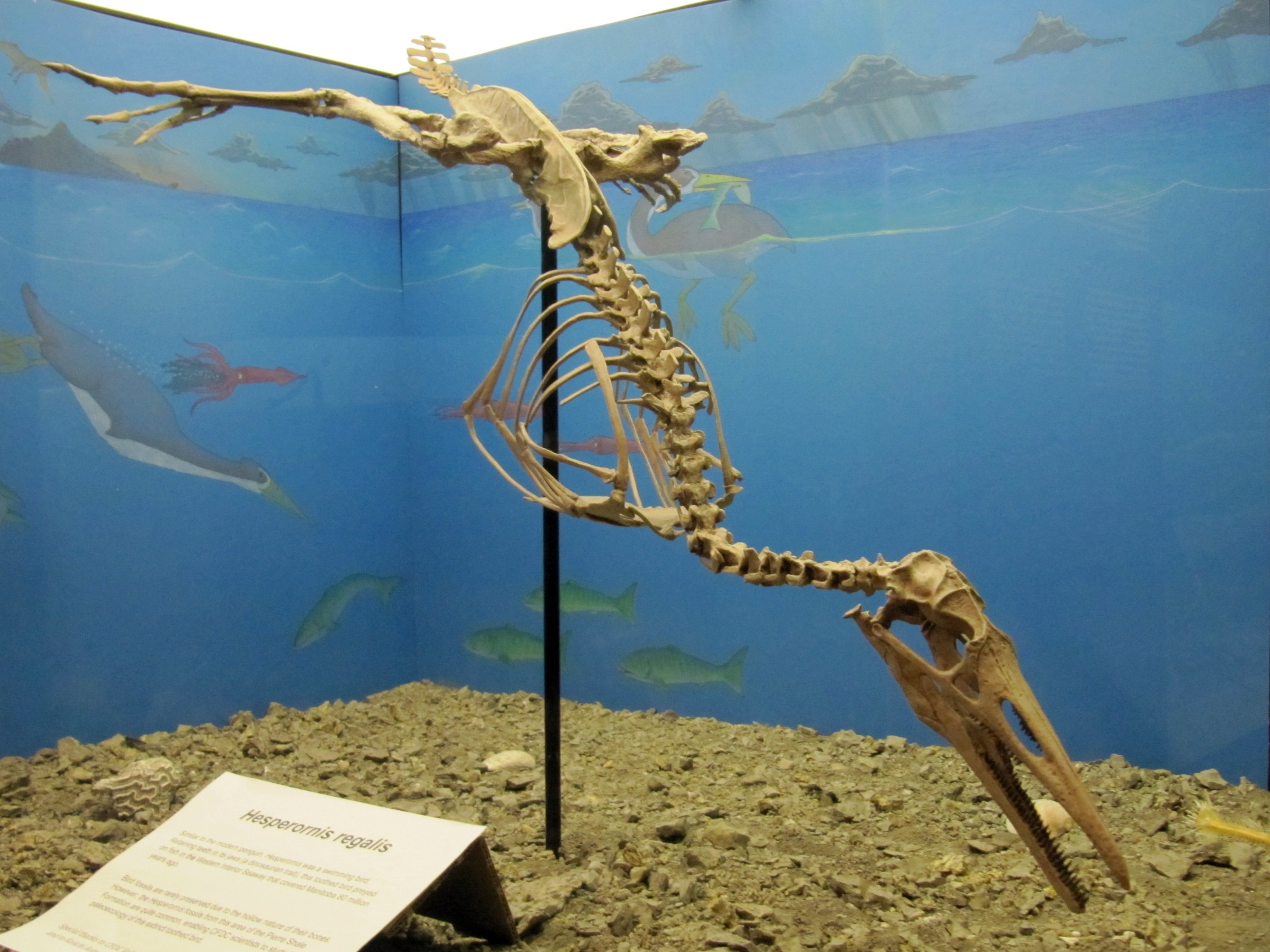
- Restored skeleton of Hesperornis regalis

Scientific classification
- Kingdom: Animalia
- Phylum: Chordata
- Class: Reptilia
- Clade: Dinosauria
- Clade: Saurischia
- Clade: Theropoda
- Clade: Avialae
- Clade: Ornithurae
- Clade: †Hesperornithes; Fürbringer, 1888

Subgroups
- †Baptornis; †Brodavis; †Chupkaornis; †Enaliornis; †Judinornis; †Pasquiaornis; †Potamornis; †Hesperornithidae Clarke, 2004; †Asiahesperornis; †Canadaga; †Fumicollis; †Hesperornis; †Parahesperornis

Synonyms
- Hesperornithiformes Sharpe, 1899

= Hesperornithes =

Hesperornitheans Temporal range: Late Cretaceous, 100–66 Ma

Extinct clade of aquatic avialans closely related to modern birds

Hesperornithes is an extinct and highly specialized group of aquatic avialans closely related to the ancestors of modern birds. They inhabited both marine and freshwater habitats in the Northern Hemisphere, and include genera such as Hesperornis, Baptornis, Parahesperornis, Enaliornis, and Potamornis, all strong-swimming, predatory divers. Many of the species most specialized for swimming were completely flightless. The largest known hesperornithean, Canadaga arctica, may have reached a maximum adult length of 2.2 metres (7.2 ft).

Hesperornitheans were the only Mesozoic avialans known to colonize the oceans. They were wiped out in the Cretaceous–Paleogene extinction event, along with enantiornitheans and all other non-avian dinosaurs.

== Anatomy and ecology ==
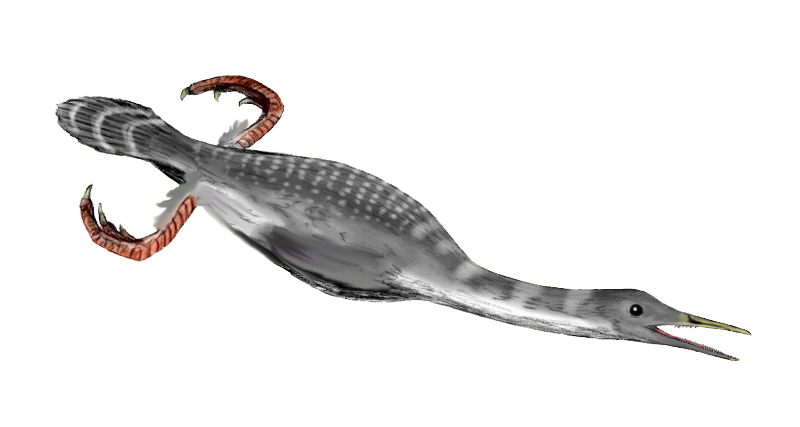
Life restoration of Hesperornis regalis

Most of what is known about this group rests on analyses of single species, as few provide sufficiently complete fossils for analysis. Although some of the smaller and more basal species, like those belonging to the subgroups Enaliornithidae and Brodavidae, might have been able to fly, the larger hesperornithids like Hesperornis and Baptornis had only vestigial wings. As in the case of modern foot-propelled diving birds, the femur and metatarsus of these animals were short, whereas the tibia was long. The legs were also set far back on the body, as in loons, grebes or penguins. Hesperornithids must have been powerful swimmers and divers but extremely ungainly on the land, and probably spent little time ashore except to nest. They were rather long-bodied, and measured about 6 feet (180 cm) long.

Some researchers think that on land they had to slide on their bellies and push with their legs; the hip and knee joints were shaped such that these species could not move them dorsoventrally, and in a resting position the feet projected sideways from the body, which would have prevented them from walking upright. The anatomy of their toes suggests that hesperornitheans had lobes of skin for propulsion underwater similar to grebes, rather than being webbed. The dense bones of these animals decreased their buoyancy, making diving easier. However, morphometric comparison with modern diving birds suggests that hesperornitheans share more similarities with diving ducks and cormorants rather than with loons or grebes.

The snout was long, and tipped with a slightly hooked beak. Behind the beak, the jaws were filled with a series of simple, sharp teeth which were set into a longitudinal groove. These probably helped to seize fish, like the serrated beak of mergansers. Unlike modern birds, they retained a joint between the lower jaw bones. It is believed that this allowed them to rotate the back portion of the mandible independently of the front, thus allowing the lower teeth to disengage.

Feather remains from specimens of this lineage have been preserved in coprolites. This lineage retained both modern and primitive feathers, which has been interpreted as one of the causes of its extinction.

== Evolution ==
Currently, the hesperornitheans are recognized as a very specialized lineage that is not ancestral to modern birds. Still, their relationship is close enough that they probably diverged from the ancestors of modern birds as late as the earliest Cretaceous.

The earliest known hesperornithean is the Early Cretaceous Enaliornis. The majority of hesperornithean species are known from the Late Cretaceous of North America. Small hesperornithean bones are known from the freshwater deposits of the Late Cretaceous of the Judith River Group as well as the Hell Creek and Lance Formations, and in several Eurasian sites. These species were about the size of a cormorant or a loon.

== Classification ==
The clade Hesperornithes was originally named as a subclass of Aves by Furbringer in 1888. However, it was generally ignored in the scientific literature in favor of the order-level name Hesperornithiformes, coined one year later. In 2004, Clarke became the first to define the hesperornithean group in terms of phylogenetics. Clarke defined Hesperornithes as all species closer to Hesperornis regalis than to modern birds, and regarded Hesperornithiformes as a junior synonym, though she did not define the latter name. Clarke also defined the more inclusive group Hesperornithidae as all hesperornitheans closer to Hesperornis than to Baptornis.

Hesperornitheans were originally combined with Ichthyornis in the paraphyletic group "Odontornithes" by Othniel Charles Marsh, in 1873. In 1875, they were separated as Odontolcae. The group was often considered to be related to loons and grebes, or to the Paleognathae (based on perceived similarities in the bony palate). These similarities, however, as the more recently determined fact that the osteons of their bones – at least in Hesperornis – were arranged in a pattern similar to that in Neognathae, are today considered to be due to convergent evolution.

=== Relationships ===
In 2015, a species-level phylogenetic analysis found the following relationships among hesperornitheans.

- Hesperornithes
  - Pasquiaornis
  - - Enaliornis
    - - Baptornithidae
        - AMNH 5101
        - FMNH 395
        - Baptornis advenus
      - - Brodavidae
          - Brodavis varneri
          - Brodavis baileyi
        - - Fumicollis hoffmani
          - Hesperornithidae
            - Parahesperornis alexi
            - Hesperornis
