= Turgai Strait =

Large shallow body of salt water of the Mesozoic and Cenozoic Eras

Paleogeographic map of Africa, Europe, and Asia 138 million years ago (Early Cretaceous), with the Turgai Strait marked by a T.

The Turgai Strait, also known as the Turgay/Turgai Sea, Obik Sea, Ural Sea or West Siberian Sea, was a large shallow body of salt water (an epicontinental or epeiric sea) during the Mesozoic through Cenozoic Eras. It extended north of the present-day Caspian Sea to the "paleo-Arctic" region, and was in existence from the Middle Jurassic to Oligocene, approximately 160 to 29 million years ago.

The Turgai Strait was not absolutely continuous throughout this entire era, though it was a persistent and predominating feature in its region; it "fragmented southern Europe and southwestern Asia into many large islands, and separated Europe from Asia."

The division of the Eurasian landmass by the Turgai Sea isolated terrestrial animal populations. Notably, the isolation of Europe by the Turgai Sea led to it developing its own unique fauna via a mixture of Europe-endemic and African-originating lineages. Following the Turgai Strait's disappearance and the extinction of much of Europe's original fauna during the Eocene-Oligocene extinction event, Asian-originating lineages such as water frogs managed to successfully migrate to and colonize Europe, leading to Europe's modern assemblage of taxa with primarily Asian origins.

The Turgai Strait derives its name from the Turgay Basin of modern-day Kazakhstan, where a stretch of the Turgai River flows.

== See also ==
- Rheic Ocean – Ancient ocean which separated two major palaeocontinents, Gondwana and Laurussia
- Sundance Sea – Jurassic inland sea
- Tethys Ocean – Prehistoric ocean between Gondwana and Laurasia
