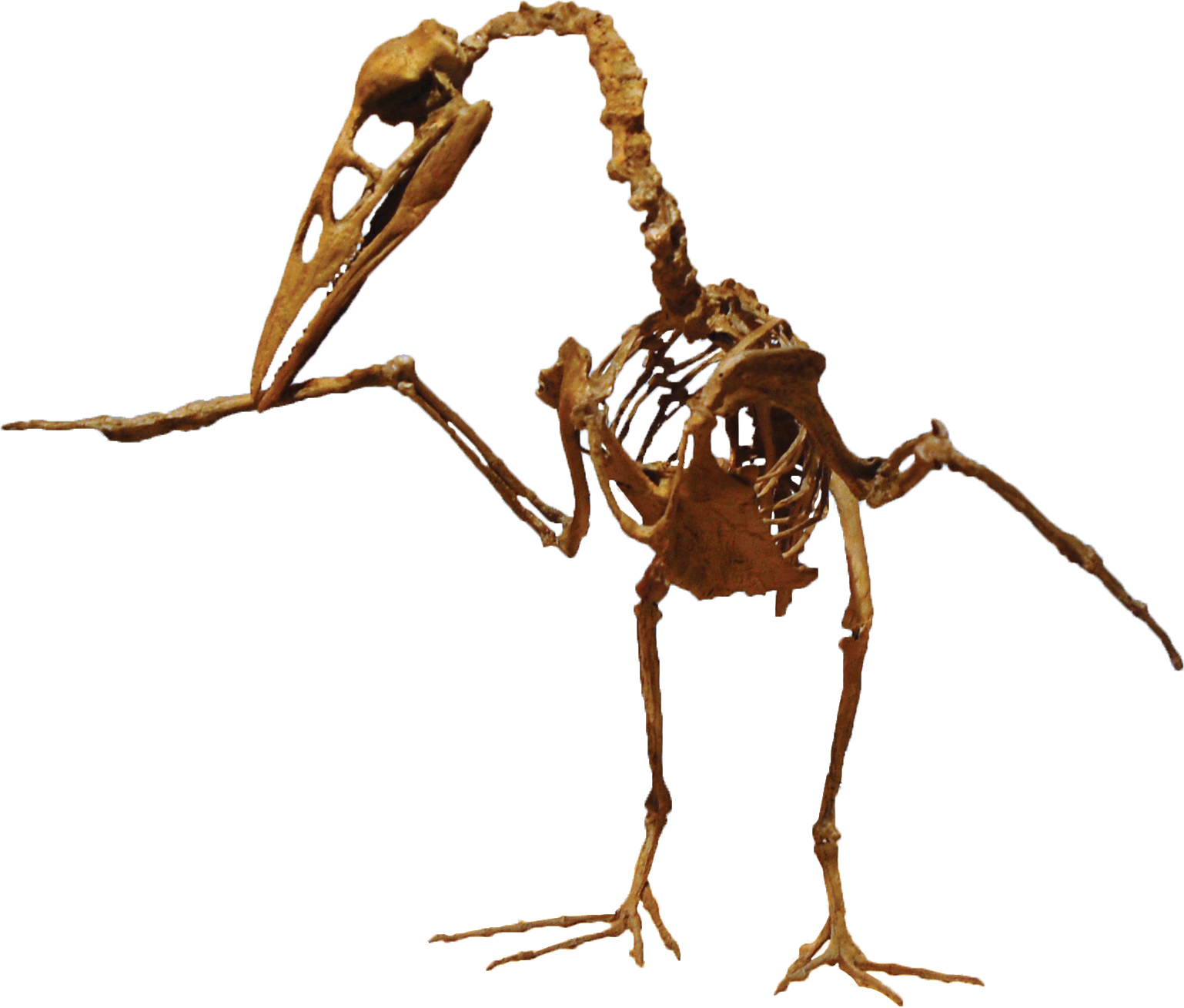
- Cast of an Ichthyornis dispar skeleton, Rocky Mountain Dinosaur Resource Center

Scientific classification
- Kingdom: Animalia
- Phylum: Chordata
- Class: Reptilia
- Clade: Dinosauria
- Clade: Saurischia
- Clade: Theropoda
- Clade: Avialae
- Clade: Ornithurae
- Clade: †Ichthyornithes; Marsh, 1873

Subgroups
- †Ichthyornis; †Janavis; And see text

Synonyms
- Ichthyornithiformes Furbringer, 1888

= Ichthyornithes =

Ichthyornitheans Temporal range: Late Cretaceous, 95–66 Ma

Extinct clade of dinosaurs

Ichthyornithes is an extinct group of toothed avialan dinosaurs very closely related to the common ancestor of all modern birds. They are known from fossil remains found throughout the late Cretaceous period of North America, though only two genera, Ichthyornis and Janavis, are represented by complete enough fossils to have been named. Ichthyornitheans became extinct at the Cretaceous–Paleogene boundary, along with enantiornitheans, all other non-avian dinosaurs, and many other animal and plant groups.

== Origin and evolution ==
The earliest known ichthyornitheans appear in the fossil record about 95 million years ago, during the Cenomanian age of the Late Cretaceous. Based on fragmentary fossil remains, the two known species present in the Ashville Formation have not been given names, but overall were very similar to Ichthyornis dispar. I. dispar itself had a very long temporal range, and specimens referred to it or very similar species existed relatively unchanged (other than some fluctuations in average adult size) for nearly 10 million years, when species referable to I. dispar disappeared and were replaced by other, though still somewhat similar, species of ichthyornitheans. The fact that ichthyornitheans appear to have existed virtually unchanged in their general size and anatomy for nearly the entire duration of the late Cretaceous period suggests that their evolutionary pace was in relative stasis compared to other, contemporary species of closely related avialans, like the hesperornitheans. Both the ichthyornitheans and hesperornitheans were strongly linked to their ecosystem in the Western Interior Seaway that bisected North America for much of the Cretaceous. It may be that while the flightless, aquatic hesperornitheans were much more sensitive to changes in shoreline extent and sea level during that time, driving their evolution and adaptation into more specialized forms, the flying, tern-like ichthyornitheans were not as dependent on specific coastal or sea-level conditions, and they were able to inhabit basically the same ecological niche for a very long period. The icthyornithean lineage finally became extinct in the Cretaceous–Paleogene extinction event that caused the extinction of many major land and marine animal groups at the end of the Mesozoic era. The last ichthyornithean fossils are found in the Hell Creek Formation very close (within 300,000 years at least) of the K-Pg boundary, dated to 66 million years old.

The study describing Protodontopteryx notes some "striking" similarities between the jaw structure of ichthyornitheans and pelagornithids. The study still classifies pelagornithids as neognaths based on a few post-cranial features and recovers them in a polytomy with Galloanserae and Neoaves, but does note that this link is worth investigating and that the pelagornithid palate is not known.

A study on an Ichthyornis endocast reveals that it had a relatively "primitive" brain compared to modern birds, similar to that of Archaeopteryx and other non-avian theropods. Conversely, it had a palate remarkably convergent with that of modern neognaths.

== Classification ==
Ichthyornitheans were close to the ancestry of modern birds, the crown group Aves, but represents an independent lineage of toothed seabird-like animals. It was long believed that several similar Cretaceous species known from fragmentary remains, including Ambiortus, Apatornis, Iaceornis and Guildavis, were members of the Ichthyornithes in addition to the group's namesake, Ichthyornis. However, these seem to have been more closely related to modern birds than to Ichthyornis dispar. In Julia Clarke's 2004 review of Ichthyornis-like fossils, the former order Ichthyornithiformes and the family Ichthyornithidae were considered synonyms of the clade Ichthyornithes, which in that paper was defined according to phylogenetic taxonomy as all descendants of the most recent common ancestor of Ichthyornis dispar and modern birds. The description of Janavis finalidens represented the first well understood relative of Ichthyornis named since Ichthyornis 's original description, resulting in the revival of the name Ichthyornithes to include Ichthyornis and its closest relatives. Benito and colleagues in 2022 defined Ichthyornithes in the PhyloCode as the largest clade containing Ichthyornis dispar but not Hesperornis regalis and Vultur gryphus.

=== Species ===
Ichthyornis dispar from North America and Janavis finalidens from Belgium are currently the only valid species of ichthyornitheans well-supported enough by distinctive fossil evidence to have received scientific names. However, isolated remains of other ichthyornithean species have been identified. For example, three isolated shoulder bone specimens (RSM P2992.1, UCMP 187207, AMNH 22002) found in the Hell Creek Formation of Montana, Lance Formation of Wyoming, and Frenchman Formation of Saskatchewan have been identified as all belonging to a single species of Ichthyornis-like avialan that inhabited this region of North America at the very end of the Maastrichtian age, within 300,000 years of the Cretaceous-Paleogene extinction event 66 million years ago. Another unnamed species similar to Ichthyornis is known from isolated remains found in Campanian-age rocks from Alberta. Two more species also represented only by fossil shoulder bones are known from the Cenomanian-age Ashville Formation near Carrot River, Saskatchewan. Though originally thought to be species of Ichthyornis, they probably represent one or more new genera. Additional ichthyornithean remains have been described from Russia, suggesting that this group ranged across much of the northern hemisphere in the Cenomanian.

== Relationships ==
The cladogram below is the result of a 2014 analysis by Michael Lee and colleagues that expanded on data from an earlier study by O'Connor & Zhou in 2012, showing the relationship of Ichthyornis to other ornithurines. The clade names are positioned based on their definitions.

- Ornithurae
  - †Ichthyornis
  - - †Hesperornithes
    - - †Limenavis
      - Aves (modern birds)
