= Graculavus =

Graculavus Temporal range: Late Cretaceous-Paleogene, 68–62 Ma

Scientific classification
- Domain: Eukaryota
- Kingdom: Animalia
- Phylum: Chordata
- Class: Aves
- Order: Charadriiformes
- Genus: †Graculavus; Marsh, 1872

Species
- G. velox (Marsh, 1870) (type); G. augustus Hope, 1999

Synonyms
- Limnosavis Shufeldt, 1915

Extinct genus of birds

Graculavus is a prehistoric bird genus that was described in the 19th century by American paleontologist O. C. Marsh. Its remains were found in the Late Cretaceous Austin Chalk of Texas, USA, and Lance Formation (late Maastrichtian faunal stage, or Lancian land mammal age), and the controversial Hornerstown Formation which straddles the Cretaceous–Paleocene boundary, possibly dating to the Danian stage. These birds lived on the shores of the northwestern Atlantic and the Western Interior Seaway some 68 to 62 million years ago.

== Classification ==
Graculavus is the namesake for the form taxon "Graculavidae", a plesiomorphic assembly of unrelated birds that were believed to hold a key position in avian evolution as "transitional shorebirds." Two species are known: Graculavus augustus from the Western Interior Seaway and Graculavus velox from the Atlantic Seaboard.

Several species have been named, but most are considered synonyms of G. velox or have been referred to other genera. Most scientists considered G. velox the only valid Graculavus species until 1999, when G. augustus was described. An additional name, Graculavus "idahensis", was included erroneously in a table of species by Shufeldt in 1915.

"Graculavus" lentus was for some time placed in Ichthyornis or Pedioecetes after being removed from the present genus. It is not related to either however and is nowadays considered an early galliform or close relative and placed in the genus Austinornis.
