= Guildavis =

Guildavis Temporal range: Late Cretaceous, 89.8–86.3 Ma

Scientific classification
- Kingdom: Animalia
- Phylum: Chordata
- Class: Reptilia
- Clade: Dinosauria
- Clade: Saurischia
- Clade: Theropoda
- Clade: Avialae
- Clade: Ornithuromorpha
- Clade: Ornithurae
- Genus: †Guildavis; Clarke, 2004
- Species: †G. tener

Binomial name
- †Guildavis tener Clarke, 2004

Synonyms
- Ichthyornis tener Marsh, 1880

Genus of avialan dinosaurs

Guildavis (meaning "Guild's bird", after Edgar W. Guild) is a genus of ornithuran avialan known from the Late Cretaceous (Santonian age Niobrara Formation of Kansas, United States. The genus contains a single species, Guildavis tener, originally classified as a species of Ichthyornis (as Ichthyornis tener) but given its own genus in 2004.

== Description ==
The type specimen of G. tener, YPM 1760, was found in 1879 by Edgar W. Guild, in the rocks of the Smoky Hill Chalk Member of the Niobara Formation, near Smoky Hill River in Wallace County, Kansas. Marsh described it and named it as a species of Ichthyornis, Ichthyornis tener, in the following year. It remained under this name until Julia Clarke named a new genus for this species, Guildavis, which means "Guild's bird", after the man who found the fossil. It was named in the same paper as Iaceornis, which was previously assigned to the genus Apatornis. The type specimen is fragmentary, consisting of two fragments of a tiny, heavily crushed sacrum.

== Classification ==
Ichthyornis, in which the Guildavis holotype was originally placed, has always been in the clade Ichthyornithes, which, as of the most recent phylogenetic studies, is closer to modern birds than the Hesperornithes are. However, when Clarke named Guildavis, it was found to be more closely related to modern birds than Ichthyornis.

== See also ==
- Ichthyornis
- Apatornis
- Iaceornis
