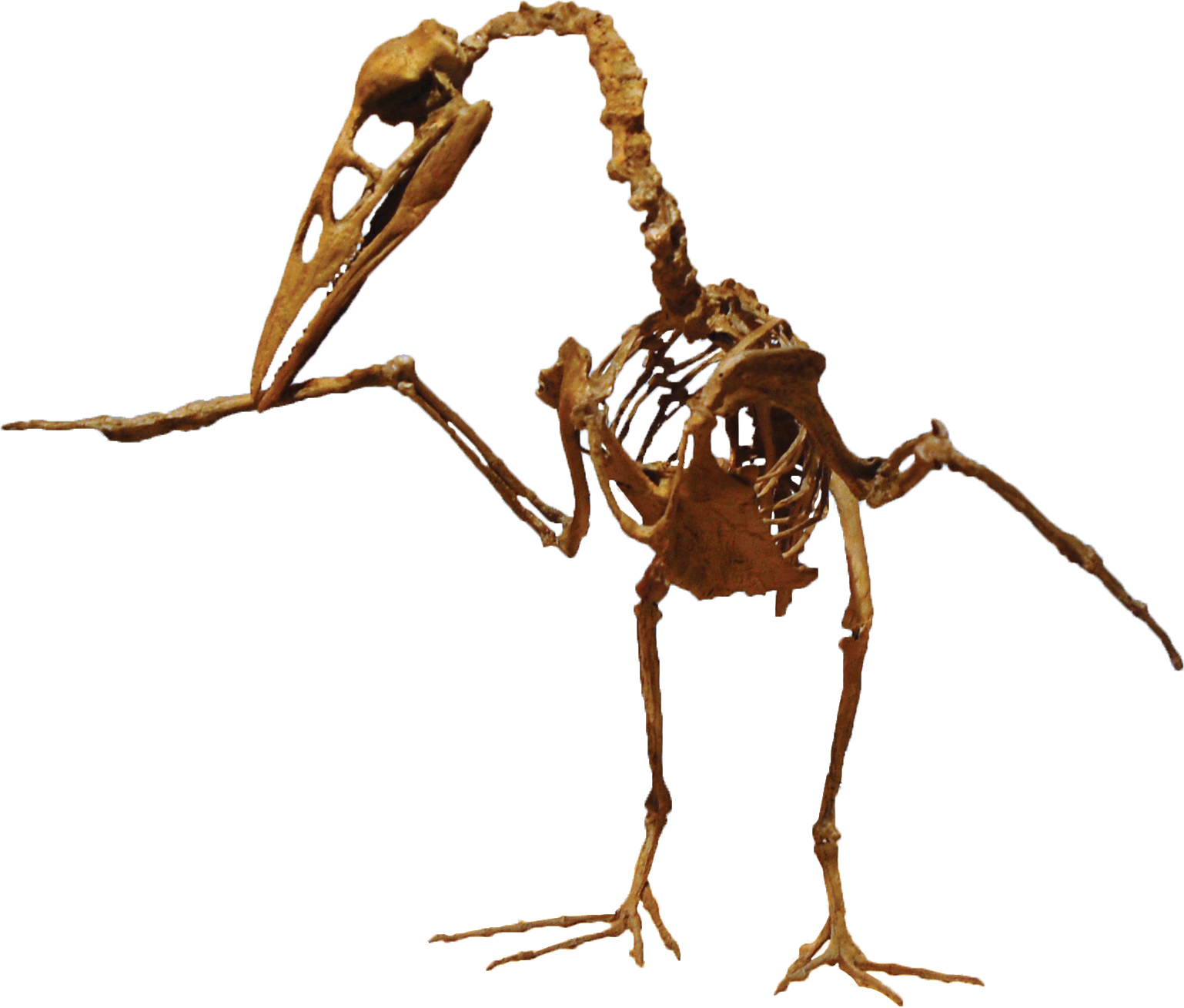
- Cast skeleton, Rocky Mountain Dinosaur Resource Center

Scientific classification
- Kingdom: Animalia
- Phylum: Chordata
- Class: Reptilia
- Clade: Dinosauria
- Clade: Saurischia
- Clade: Theropoda
- Clade: Avialae
- Clade: Ornithuromorpha
- Clade: Ornithurae
- Clade: †Ichthyornithes
- Genus: †Ichthyornis; Marsh, 1872

Type species
- †Ichthyornis dispar Marsh, 1873

Synonyms
- Angelinornis Kashin 1972; Colonosaurus Marsh, 1872c Plegadornis Wetmore 1962 (preoccupied) Species synonymy: Graculavus anceps Marsh, 1872a; Ichthyornis anceps (Marsh 1872a) Marsh 1872b; Colonosaurus mudgei Marsh, 1872c; Graculavus agilis Marsh, 1873b; Ichthyornis agilis (Marsh, 1873b) Marsh 1880; Ichthyornis victor Marsh, 1876; Ichthyornis validus Marsh, 1880; Plegadornis antecessor Wetmore, 1962; Angelinornis antecessor (Wetmore, 1962) Kashin 1972; Ichthyornis antecessor (Wetmore, 1962) Olson 1975

= Ichthyornis =

Ichthyornis Temporal range: Late Cretaceous, Cenomanian–Campanian

Extinct genus of birds

Ichthyornis (meaning "fish bird", after its fish-like vertebrae) is an extinct genus of toothy seabird-like ornithuran from the Late Cretaceous of North America. Its fossil remains are mostly known from the chalks of Alberta, Alabama, Kansas (Greenhorn Limestone), New Mexico, Saskatchewan, and Texas, in strata that were laid down in the Western Interior Seaway, spanning from the Cenomanian to the Campanian ages of the Late Cretaceous. Ichthyornis is a common component of the Niobrara Formation fauna, and numerous specimens have been found.

Ichthyornis has been historically important in shedding light on bird evolution. It was the first known prehistoric bird relative preserved with teeth, and Charles Darwin noted its significance during the early years of the theory of evolution. Ichthyornis remains important today as it is one of the few Mesozoic era ornithurans known from more than a few specimens.

== Description ==
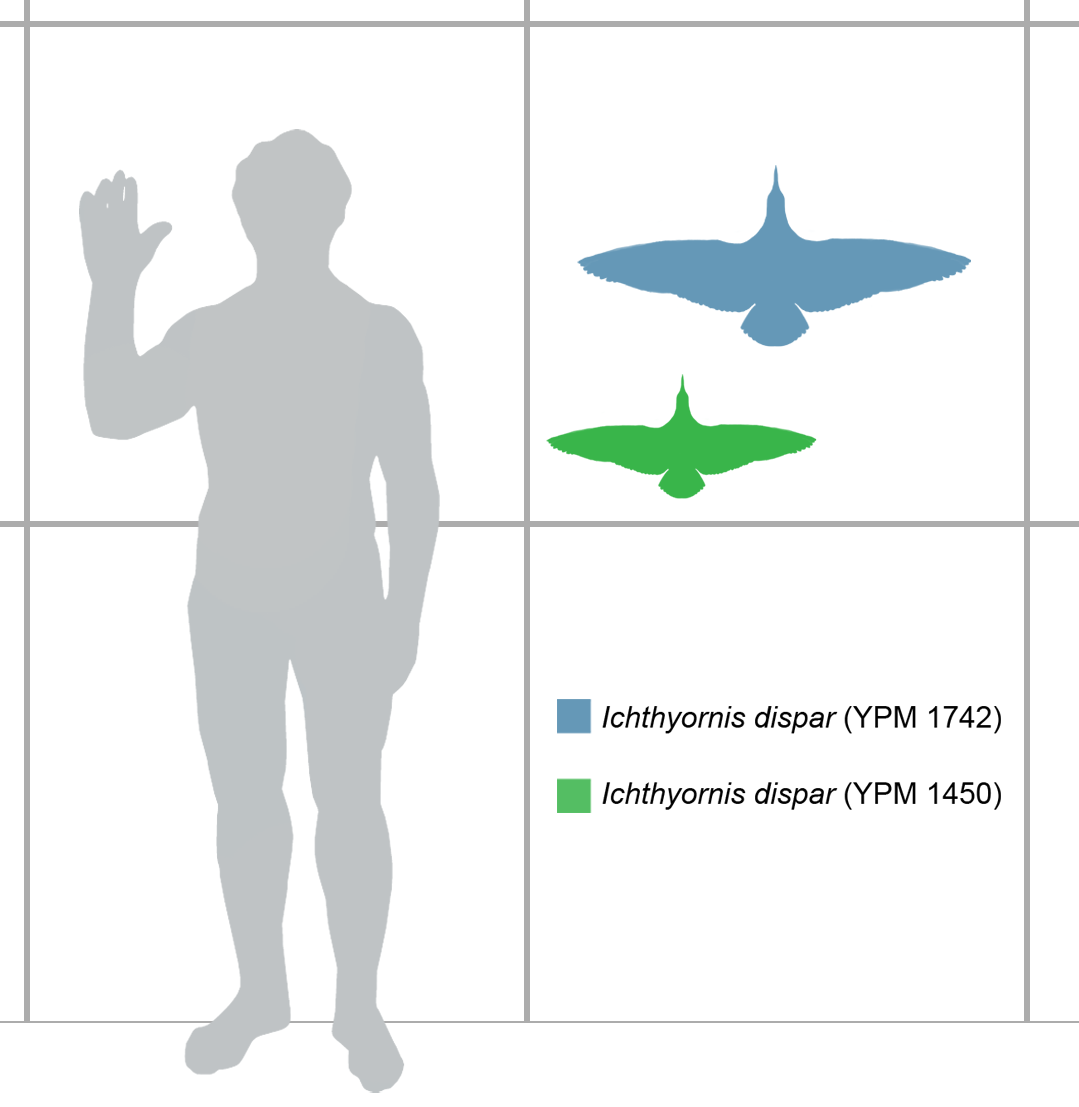
Relative size of two I. dispar specimens: YPM 1742, blue, and YPM 1450, green, compared with a human. Both specimens were adult, but YPM 1450 is approximately one million years older.

It is thought that Ichthyornis was the Cretaceous ecological equivalent of modern seabirds such as gulls, petrels, and skimmers. An average specimen was the size of a pigeon, 24 centimetres (9.4 in) long, with a skeletal wingspan (not taking feathers into account) of around 43 centimetres (17 in), though there is considerable size variation among known specimens, with some smaller and some much larger than the type specimen of I. dispar.

Ichthyornis is notable primarily for its combination of vertebrae which are concave both in front and back (similar to some fish, which is where it gets its name) and several more subtle features of its skeleton which set it apart from its close relatives. Ichthyornis is perhaps most well known for its teeth. The teeth were present only in the middle portion of the upper and lower jaws. The jaw tips had no teeth and were covered in a beak. The beak of Ichthyornis, like the hesperornithids, was compound and made up of several distinct plates, similar to the beak of an albatross, rather than a single sheet of keratin as in most modern birds. The teeth were more flattened than the rounded teeth found in crocodilians, though they became wider towards the base of the crown. The tips of the teeth were curved backward and lacked any serrations. They were arranged in a groove, much like those of marine reptiles.

The wings and breastbone were very modern in appearance, suggesting strong flight ability and placing it with modern birds in the advanced group Carinatae. Unlike earlier avialans such as the enantiornithines, the species appears to have matured to adulthood in a rather short, continuous process.

A study on an Ichthyornis endocast reveals that it had a relatively basal brain compared to modern birds, similar to that of Archaeopteryx and other non-avian theropods. Conversely, it had a palate remarkably convergent with that of modern neognaths.

== Timespan and evolution ==
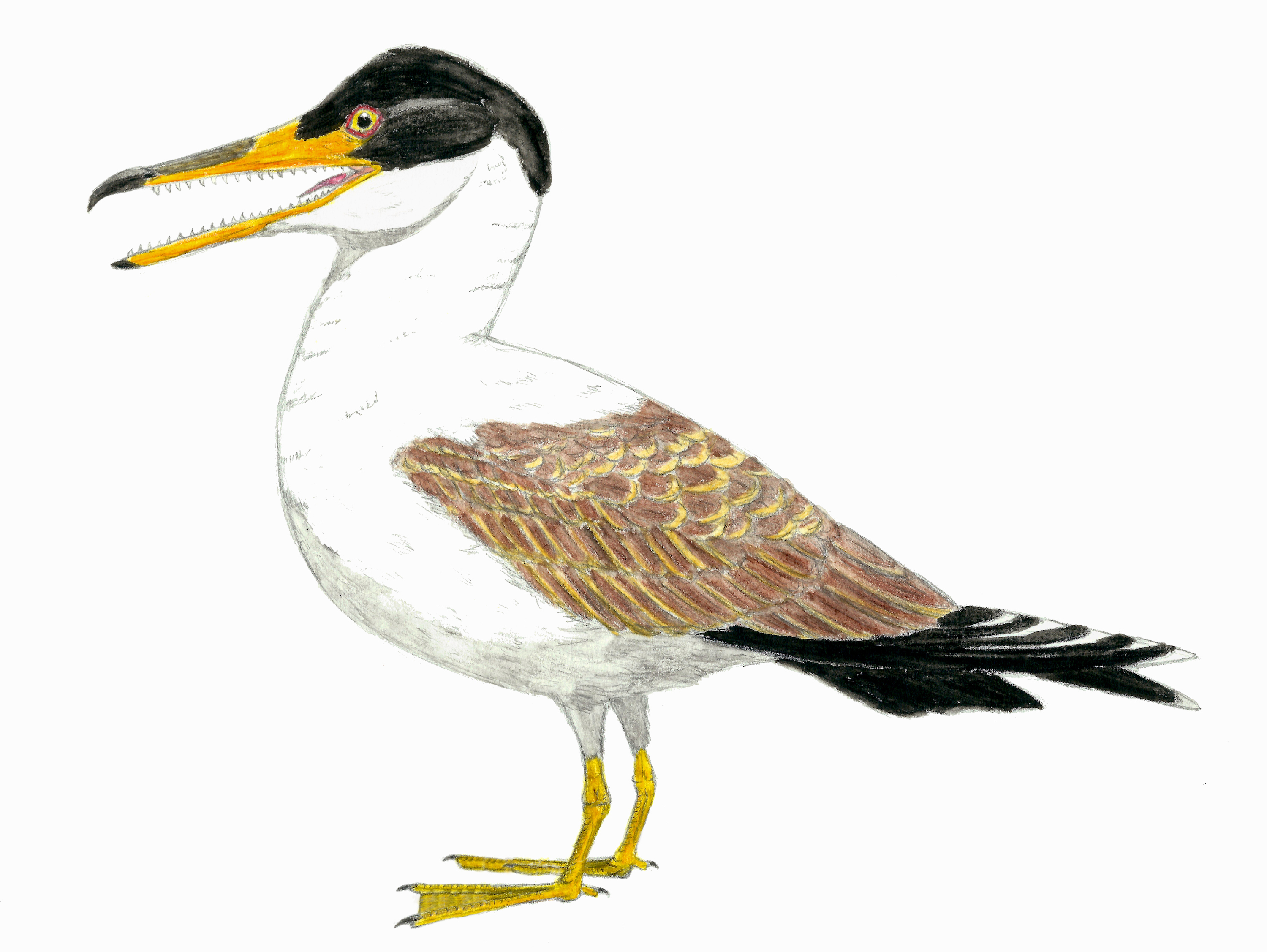
Restoration of I. dispar

Ichthyornis fossils have been found in almost all levels of the Niobrara Chalk, from beds dating to the late Coniacian age (about 89 million years ago) to the Campanian age (about 83.5 million years ago). The southernmost record of equivalent age is known from Mexico. Even earlier remains attributed to Ichthyornis have been found in the Greenhorn Formation of Kansas, dating to the early Turonian age (about 93 million years ago), and the late Cenomanian age of Saskatchewan, Canada. There are fossils from the later Pierre Shale. Specimens of Ichthyornis from earlier eras were, on average, smaller than later ones. The holotype specimen of Ichthyornis dispar, YPM 1450, had a humerus about 58 millimetres (2.3 in) long. In many geologically younger specimens like YPM 1742, the same wing bone was 71.5 millimetres (2.81 in) long. Both the older, smaller specimens, and the more recent, larger specimens show signs that they had reached skeletal maturity and were adults, and came from the same geographic area. It is likely that Ichthyornis dispar as a species increased in size over the several million years it inhabited the Western Interior Seaway ecosystem.

== History of study ==
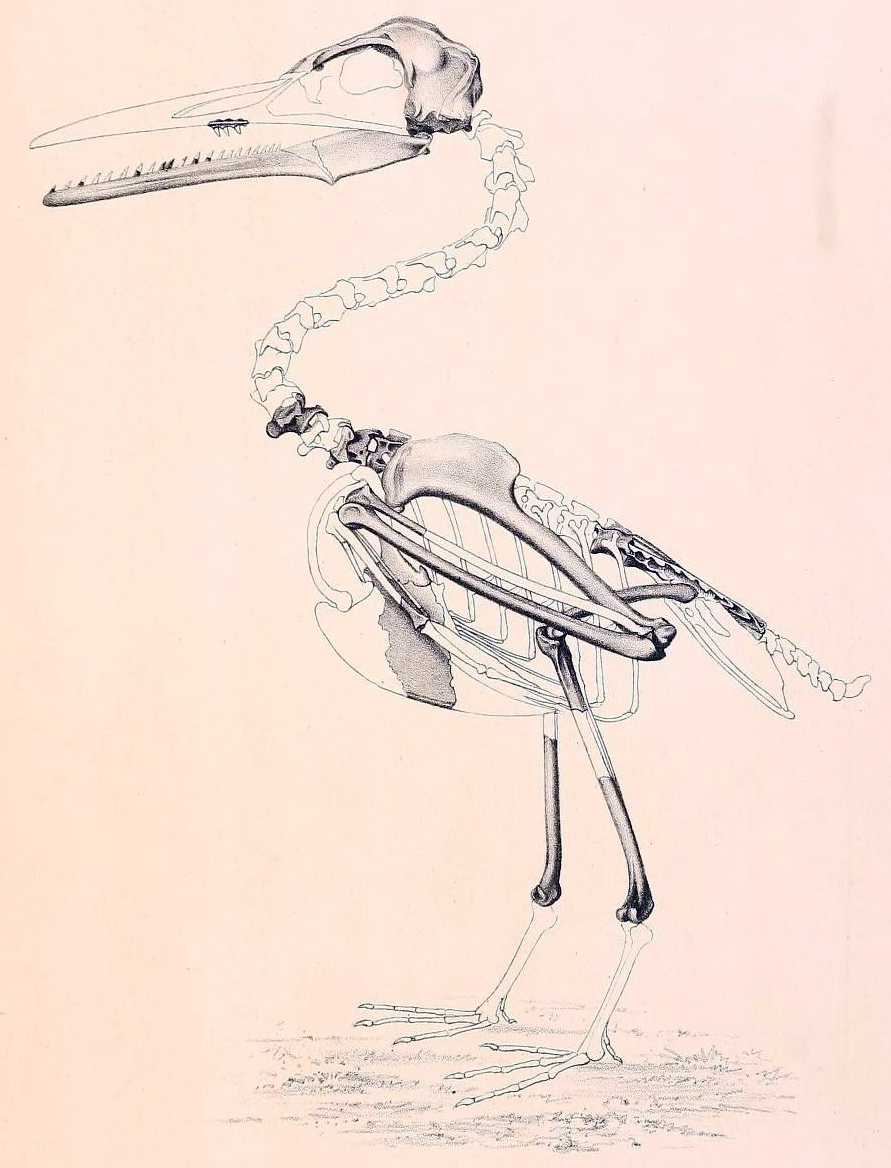
Skeletal restoration based on the holotype of I. dispar

Ichthyornis was one of the first Mesozoic avialans ever found and the first one known to have had teeth, making it an important discovery in the early history of paleontology. It remains important today, as it represents one of the closest non-avian relatives of modern birds, and one of a handful of Mesozoic bird relatives represented by numerous specimens. Ichthyornis was discovered in 1870 by Benjamin Franklin Mudge, a professor from Kansas State Agricultural College who recovered the initial fossils from the North Fork of the Solomon River in Kansas, United States. Mudge was a prolific fossil collector who shipped his discoveries to prominent scientists for study. Mudge had previously had a close partnership with paleontologist Edward Drinker Cope of the Academy of Natural Sciences in Philadelphia. However, as described by S.W. Williston in 1898, Mudge was soon contacted by Othniel Charles Marsh, Cope's rival in the so-called Bone Wars, a rush to collect and identify fossils in the American West. Marsh wrote to Mudge in 1872 and offered to identify any important fossils free of charge, and to give Mudge sole credit for their discovery. Marsh had been a friend of Mudge when they were younger, so when Mudge learned of Marsh's request, he changed the address on the shipping crate containing the Ichthyornis specimen (which had already been addressed to Cope and was ready to be sent), and shipped it to Marsh instead. Marsh had narrowly won the prestige of studying and naming the important fossil at the expense of his rival.

However, Marsh did not initially recognize the true importance of the fossil. Soon after receiving it, he reported back to Mudge his opinion that the chalk slab contained the bones of two distinct animals: a small bird animal, and the toothed jaws of some unknown reptile. Marsh considered the unusual vertebrae of the bird to resemble those of a fish, so he named it Ichthyornis, or "fish bird." Later in 1872, Marsh described the toothed jaws as a new species of marine reptile, named Colonosaurus mudgei after their discoverer. The similarity of the lower jaw and teeth to those of mosasaurs is so great that as late as 1952, J.T. Gregory argued that it really belonged to a diminutive species or young individual related to the genus Clidastes.

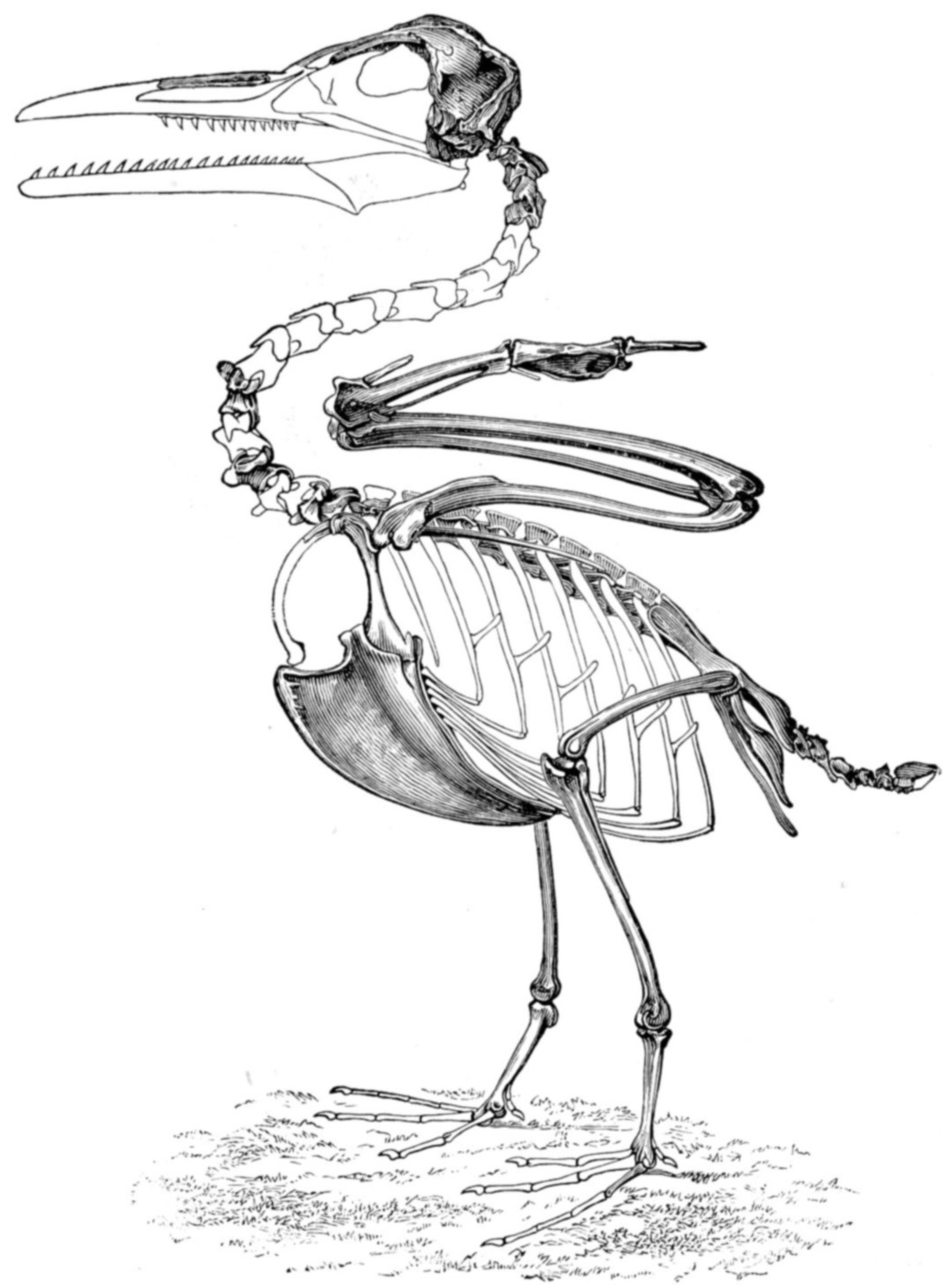
Skeletal restoration based on the holotype of I. victor (now I. dispar) by O.C. Marsh.

By early in 1873, Marsh had recognized his error. Through further preparation and exposure of skull bones from the rock, he found that the toothed jaws must have come from the bird itself and not a marine reptile. Due to the previously unknown features of Ichthyornis (vertebrae concave on either side and teeth), Marsh chose to classify it in an entirely new sub-class of birds he called the Odontornithes (or "toothed birds"), and in the new order Ichthyornithes (later Ichthyornithiformes). The only other bird Marsh included in these groups was the newly named Apatornis, which he had previously named as a species of Ichthyornis, I. celer. Mudge later noted the rare and unique quality of these toothed birds (including Hesperornis, which was found to also have teeth by 1877), and the irony of their association with the remains of toothless pterosaurs, flying reptiles which were only known to have had teeth in other regions of the world at that time.

Soon after these discoveries, Ichthyornis was recognized for its significance to the theory of evolution recently published by Charles Darwin. Darwin himself told Marsh in an 1880 letter that Ichthyornis and Hesperornis offered "the best support for the theory of evolution" since he had first published On the Origin of Species in 1859. (While Archaeopteryx was the first known Mesozoic avialan and is now known to have also had teeth, the first specimen with a skull was not described until 1884). Others at the time also recognized the implications of a nearly modern bird with reptilian teeth, and feared the controversy it caused. One Yale student described various men and women urging Marsh to conceal Ichthyornis from the public because it lent too much support to evolutionary theory. Many accused Marsh of having tampered with the fossils or intentionally created a hoax by associating reptilian jaws with the body of a bird, accusations that continued to surface even as late as 1967. However, an overwhelming majority of researchers have demonstrated that Marsh's interpretation of the fossils was correct, and he was fully vindicated by later finds.

=== Mounted specimens ===
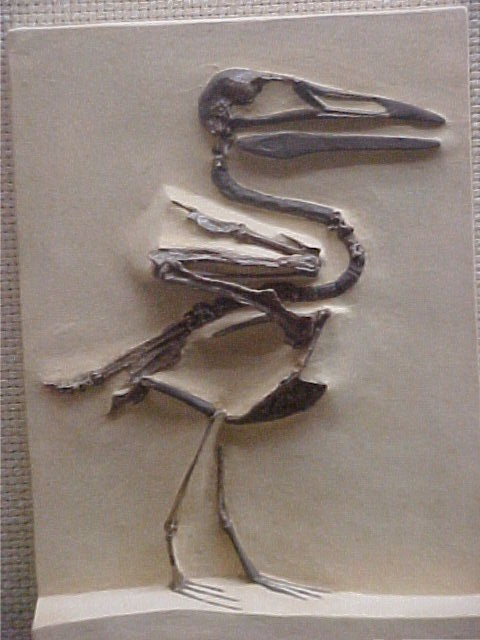
Cast of the original composite panel mount of "I. victor" (now I. dispar), Peabody Museum of Natural History

At the turn of the 20th century, the Peabody Museum of Natural History at Yale University, where most Ichthyornis specimens were housed, began placing many of its most interesting or important specimens on display in the museum's Great Hall. Two panel mounts (that is, pieces where the skeleton is arranged and set into a plaster slab) were created for Ichthyornis; one for I. dispar, and one for "I. victor". Both were created by Hugh Gibb, who prepared many of Marsh's fossils for study and display. The I. dispar mount contained only the holotype fossils, while the "I. victor" mount was a composite incorporating a variety of different specimens to make the piece appear more complete (it did not, however, contain any part of the actual "I. victor" holotype specimen).

At some point before 1937, the catalogue number of the actual "I. victor" type specimen was mistakenly reassigned to the panel mount. Later reports of the specimen, even by the Peabody Museum's staff, therefore mistakenly stated that the original "I. victor" specimen comprised most of the skeleton, when it was in fact only three bones. By 1997, the situation had become so confused that Jacques Gauthier, the current curator of the museum's vertebrate paleontology collection, authorized the dismantling of both panel mounts. This allowed the bones to be properly sorted out and studied in three dimensions, which had been impossible previously when they were embedded in plaster. A full re-description of these specimens was published by paleontologist Julia Clarke in 2004.

== Classification ==
Ichthyornis is close to the ancestry of modern birds, the Aves, but represents an independent lineage. It was long believed that it was closely related to some other Cretaceous taxa known from very fragmentary remains – Ambiortus, Apatornis, Iaceornis and Guildavis – but these seem to be closer to the ancestors of modern birds than to Ichthyornis dispar. In Clarke's 2004 review, the former order Ichthyornithiformes and the family Ichthyornithidae are now superseded by the clade Ichthyornithes, which in the paper was also defined according to phylogenetic taxonomy as all descendants of the most recent common ancestor of Ichthyornis dispar and modern birds.

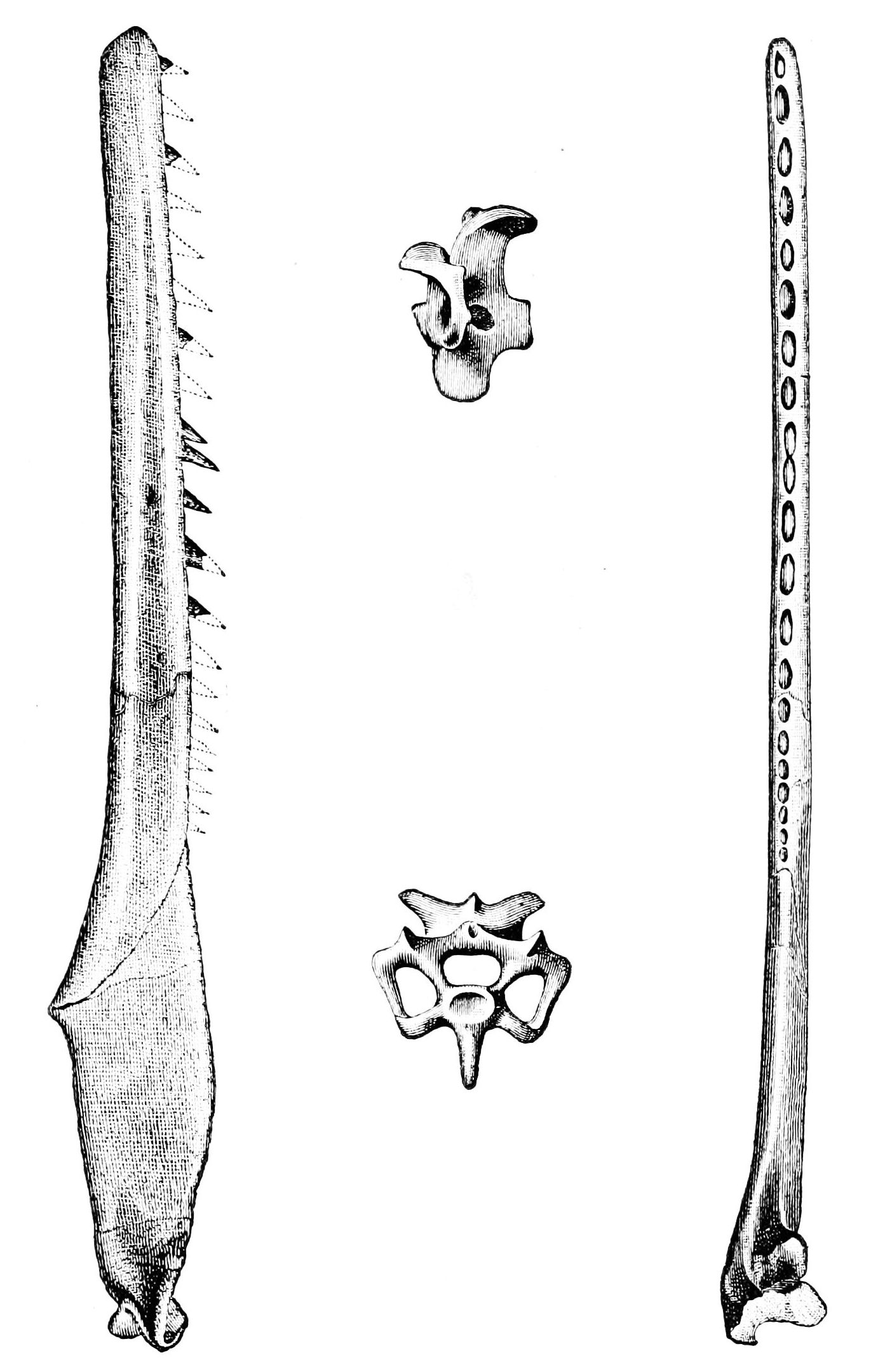
Mandible and vertebra

Of the several described species, only one, Ichthyornis dispar, is currently recognized, following the seminal review by Julia Clarke. Marsh had previously named a specimen now attributed to I. dispar as Graculavus anceps. Clarke argued that because the rules for naming animals laid out by the ICZN state that a type species for a genus must have originally been included in that genus, Ichthyornis anceps is ineligible to replace I. dispar as the type species and so must be considered a junior synonym even though it was named first. However, Michael Mortimer pointed out that this is incorrect; while I. anceps cannot become the type species of Ichthyornis, the ICZN does not preclude it from becoming the senior synonym of the type species I. dispar. Therefore, I. anceps should have been considered the correct name for the only recognized Ichthyornis species. All other supposed species of Ichthyornis have not been supported as valid. The presumed "Ichthyornis" lentos, for example, actually belongs into the early galliform genus Austinornis. "Ichthyornis" minusculus from the Bissekty Formation (Late Cretaceous) of Kyzyl Kum, Uzbekistan, is probably an enantiornithine. All other Ichthyornis species are synonymous with I. dispar.

The cladogram below is the result of a 2014 analysis by Michael Lee and colleagues that expanded on data from an earlier study by O’Connor & Zhou in 2012. The clade names are positioned based on their definitions.

- Ornithurae
  - †Ichthyornis
  - - †Hesperornithes
    - - †Limenavis
      - Aves (modern birds)
