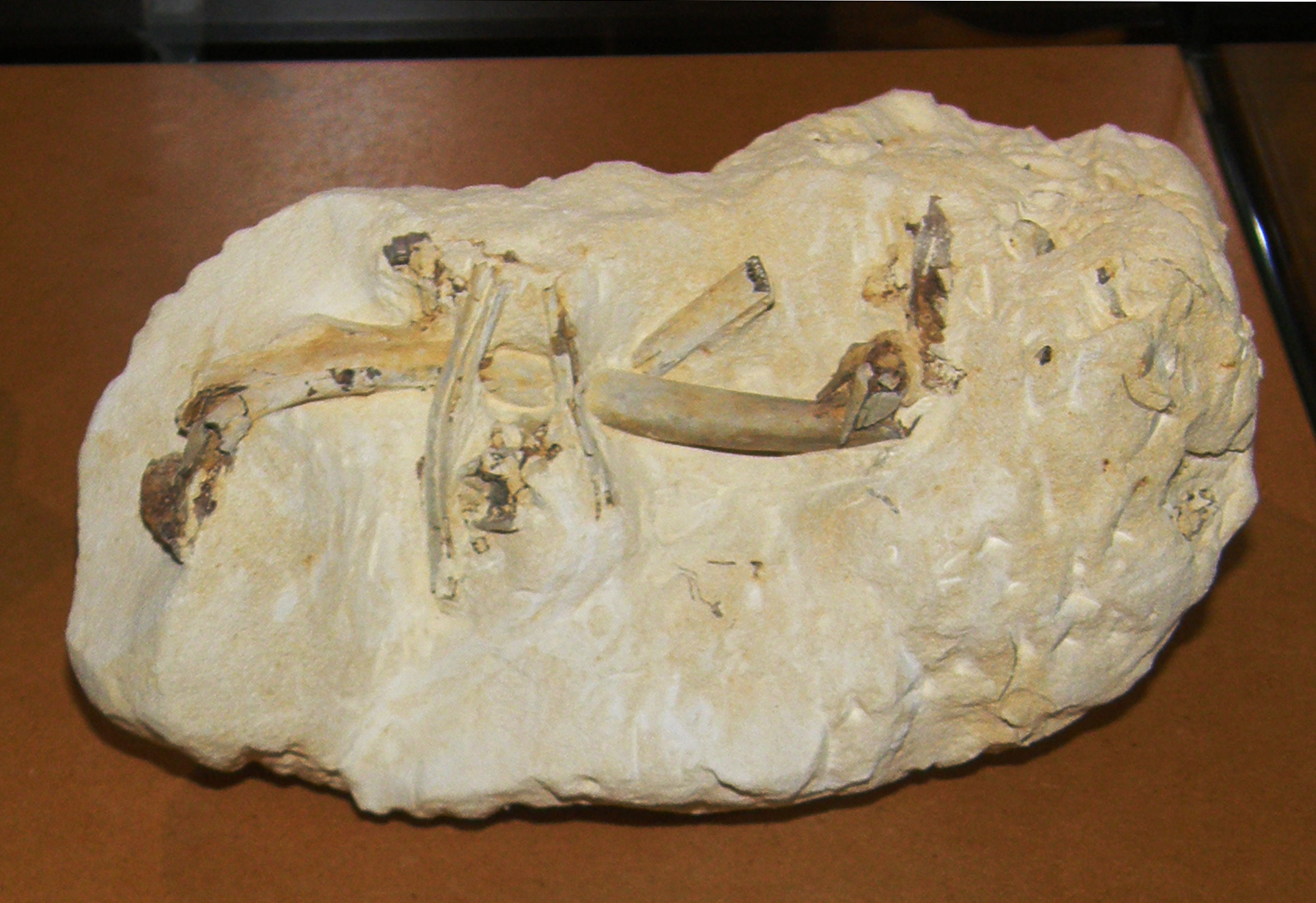
- Holotype block

Scientific classification
- Kingdom: Animalia
- Phylum: Chordata
- Class: Reptilia
- Clade: Dinosauria
- Clade: Saurischia
- Clade: Theropoda
- Clade: Avialae
- Clade: †Ichthyornithes
- Genus: †Janavis; Benito et al. 2022

Type species
- †Janavis finalidens Benito et al. 2022

= Janavis =

Janavis Temporal range: Late Maastrichtian 66.8–66.7 Ma

Fossil bird genus from Belgium

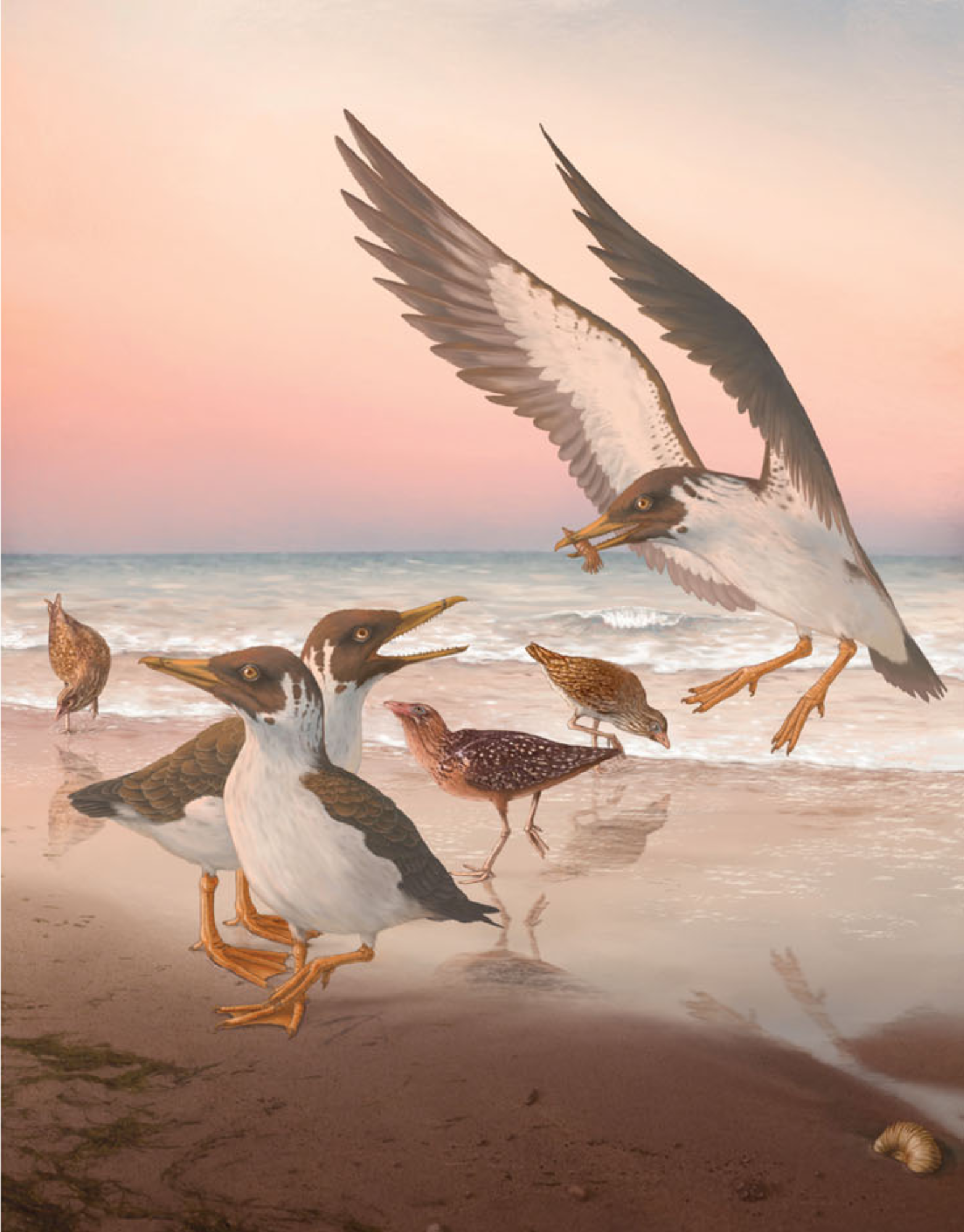
Speculative life restoration of Janavis on a beach

Janavis (from the Roman god Janus and the Latin avis for bird) is an extinct toothed bird belonging to the Ichthyornithes from the Late Cretaceous of Belgium. The genus has one named species, Janavis finalidens (from Latin finalis, meaning ending or final, and dens, for tooth) that was discovered in the 1990s, reported in 2002, and described in 2022. Recovered almost simultaneously from the same area and age as Asteriornis maastrichtensis, then the oldest known modern bird, it provides information on the evolution and divergence of basal and modern birds, especially on the evolutionary modifications of bird skulls.

== Fossil ==
The fossil of Janavis, holotype, NHMM RD 271, is embedded in hard rock from the Valkenburg Member of the Maastricht Formation, dating from the Maastrichtian, that made it impossible to perform a detailed analysis without breaking it up. Only parts of the skull (a left pterygoid bone at first mistaken for a part of the forelimb) are exposed on the main block; while a fragmentary tooth, a toe phalanx and three vertebrae of the backbone are associated with it. Examination using computed tomography in 2021 revealed additional structures inside the rock including neck bones (six cervical vertebrae), an additional four dorsal vertebrae, the first phalanx of the second digit of the forelimb, the left scapula, a humerus and a bit of the upper right femur.

== History ==
The fossil of Janavis was collected in 2000 during a fossil excavation in the Maastricht Formation exposed at the Cimenterie Belge Réunie-Romontbos Quarry, west of the village of Eben Emael (Bassenge), Belgium. It was collected and partly prepared by Dutch amateur palaeontologist Rudi W. Dortangs. A team of American and Dutch palaeontologists reported the first identification as "Europe's last Mesozoic bird" in 2002 from which it was assigned as a species of the ancestral group (as a basal member of the clade Ornithurae) of modern birds. The sediments on which the fossil was laid were estimated to be 66.8 million years old, from the Late Cretaceous. The researchers concluded: "This fossil is the youngest non-neornithine (= non-modern) bird known to date from anywhere in the world–it was collected just 40 m below (equivalent to about 800,000 years before) the K-T boundary."

The fossil was donated by Dortangs to the Natuurhistorisch Museum Maastricht (Maastricht Natural History Museum) in Maastricht, the Netherlands, from where it was sent to Daniel J. Field's team at the University of Cambridge in 2018. Field's PhD student, Juan Benito, was assigned for the analysis. Hoping that a CT scan could give the parts remaining in the rocks, he made a series of observations, but was disappointed. All he could see was "just a bunch of vertebrae and rib." Two years later, Benito, then a post-doctoral scholar, re-examined the specimen. Field's team subsequently made more elaborate CT scans and came to the conclusion that the specimen was of an ancient bird species not known to science. They published a new description in Nature in 2022, giving it the name Janavis finalidens. The genus name was derived from the Roman god Janus, the god of beginnings and endings, and the Latin word avis for bird; the specific name from the Latin finalis, meaning ending or final, and dens, for tooth, reflecting that the specimen is among the latest-known toothed birds.

== Description ==
Janavis is a relatively large bird, with an estimated wingspan of about five feet. The humerus has a length of 134.8 millimeters compared to 71.5 millimeters for the largest known Ichthyornis upper arm bone, specimen YPM 1742. Extrapolation from the humerus shaft circumference results in a weight estimate for Janavis of 1504 grammes. Extrapolation from the humerus length indicates 1604 grammes but was deemed less reliable as this element is broken in the fossil. The minimal weight estimate is 1120 grammes.

Apart from its size, Janavis can be distinguished from all other known Euornithes by its greater degree of pneumatisation of the dorsal vertebrae and ribs, especially by the presence of large pneumatic openings in the underside of the front thoracic vertebrae and paired fenestrated tubercles on the lower outer edge of the fifteenth presacral vertebra. The shoulder blade lacks an acromion. This is shared with some modern euornithean groups but these are all much more derived.

The pterygoid is not fused to the palatine bone in front of it, but connected via a ball-shaped facet. On the top the contact facets with the basipterygoid processes are large and ovoid. Both traits indicate a kinesis of the front skull, allowing a vertical movement of the upper jaws relative to the rear of the skull. This condition is shared with the Neognathae, but differs from the rigid palate of the Paleognathae. As Janavis is placed in a position basal to both groups in the evolutionary tree, this would indicate that the Paleognathae independently developed a rigid palate, contrary to the standard interpretation that this trait is a plesiomorphy inherited from the most basal birds.
