= Limenavis =

Limenavis Temporal range: Late Cretaceous, 70 Ma

Scientific classification
- Kingdom: Animalia
- Phylum: Chordata
- Class: Reptilia
- Clade: Dinosauria
- Clade: Saurischia
- Clade: Theropoda
- Clade: Avialae
- Clade: Ornithuromorpha
- Clade: Ornithurae
- Genus: †Limenavis; Clarke & Chiappe, 2001
- Species: †L. patagonica

Binomial name
- †Limenavis patagonica Clarke & Chiappe, 2001

Extinct genus of dinosaurs

Limenavis is a genus of ornithuran dinosaurs from the Late Cretaceous. It lived about 70 million years ago, around the Campanian-Maastrichtian boundary. Known from several broken bones, the remains of the only known species Limenavis patagonica were found in rocks of the "lower member" of the Allen Formation at Salitral Moreno, 20 km south of General Roca, Río Negro (Argentina). It is one of the closest relatives, in the fossil record, of the modern birds.

Of all the stem-birds known to date, this species is among those closest to the common ancestor of all living birds. Its generic name pays tribute to this fact: Limenavis, meaning "bird of the threshold" or "limit-bird", is derived from Latin limen ("threshold") + avis ("bird"). The specific name patagonica refers to the specimen's Patagonian provenance.

== Classification ==
The relationships of Limenavis have been difficult to determine. Analyses published in 2001 and 2002 by Julia Clarke and Luis Chiappe found Limenavis to be a member of Carinatae more advanced than Ichthyornis but not a member of the modern bird group Neornithes. A 2013 analysis by O'Connor and colleagues found it to be slightly more primitive than Ichthyornis.

It has been suggested that some features link it with paleognath birds, perhaps related to the ancestors of tinamous or rheas. Though such birds must have existed by that time already, and most likely at least tinamou ancestors (basal Tinamiformes) did live in South America by the Late Cretaceous, tinamous proper (Tinamidae) are only known with certainty since the Miocene.
