= Qinornis =

Qinornis Temporal range: Paleocene, 61 Ma

Scientific classification
- Domain: Eukaryota
- Kingdom: Animalia
- Phylum: Chordata
- Clade: Dinosauria
- Clade: Saurischia
- Clade: Theropoda
- Clade: Avialae
- Clade: Ornithuromorpha
- Clade: Ornithurae
- Genus: †Qinornis; Xue, 1995
- Species: †Q. paleocenica

Binomial name
- †Qinornis paleocenica Xue, 1995

Extinct genus of birds

Qinornis is a genus of extinct ornithuran from the early-mid-Paleocene epoch (late Danian age), about 61 million years ago. It is known from a single fossil specimen consisting of a partial hind limb and foot, which was found in Fangou Formation deposits in Luonan County, China.

The bones show uniquely primitive characteristics for its age, and its describer considered that it was either a juvenile of a modern bird group or, if an adult, the only known non-neornithine bird to have survived the Cretaceous–Paleogene extinction event. Unusually for such a recent bird, the bones of the foot are not completely fused to one another. This characteristic is found in juvenile modern birds, and in adults of more primitive, non-neornithean ornithurine birds, all of which were assumed to have become extinct in the Cretaceous–Paleogene extinction event, despite a sparse late-Maastrichtian fossil record limited primarily to North America. In 2007, Mayr examined the bones and concluded that they represented an adult, and probably did come from a non-neornithine bird similar to Apsaravis "because the distal tarsalia are completely fused with the metatarsalia and the articular ends of the tarsometatarsus do not exhibit the blurred surfaces characteristic for the growing bones of juvenile neornithine birds."
