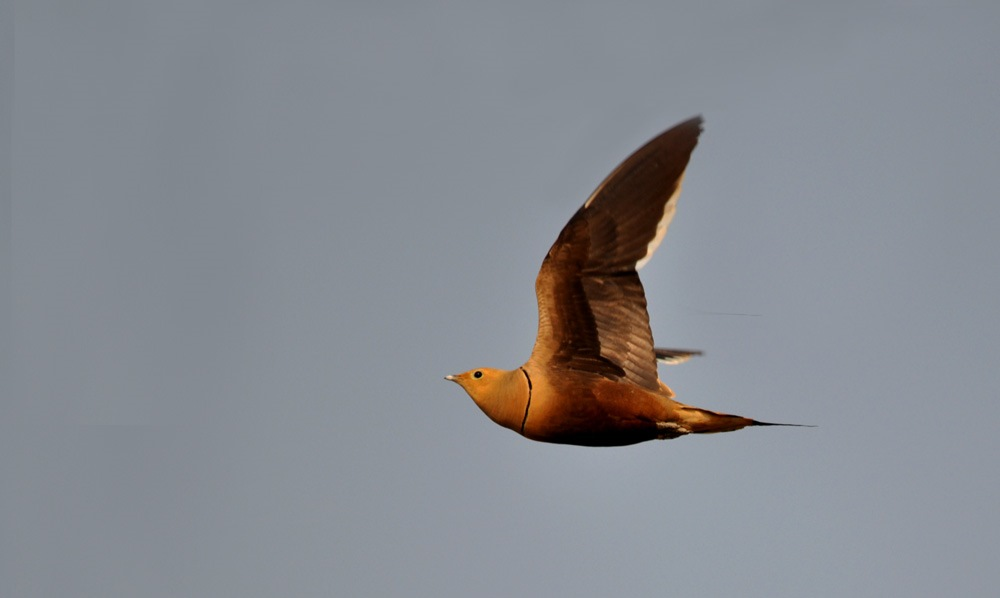
- Chestnut-bellied sandgrouse (Pterocles exustus) in flight

Scientific classification
- Kingdom: Animalia
- Phylum: Chordata
- Class: Reptilia
- Clade: Dinosauria
- Clade: Saurischia
- Clade: Theropoda
- Clade: Avialae
- Clade: Ornithurae
- Clade: Carinatae

= Carinatae =

Group of birds

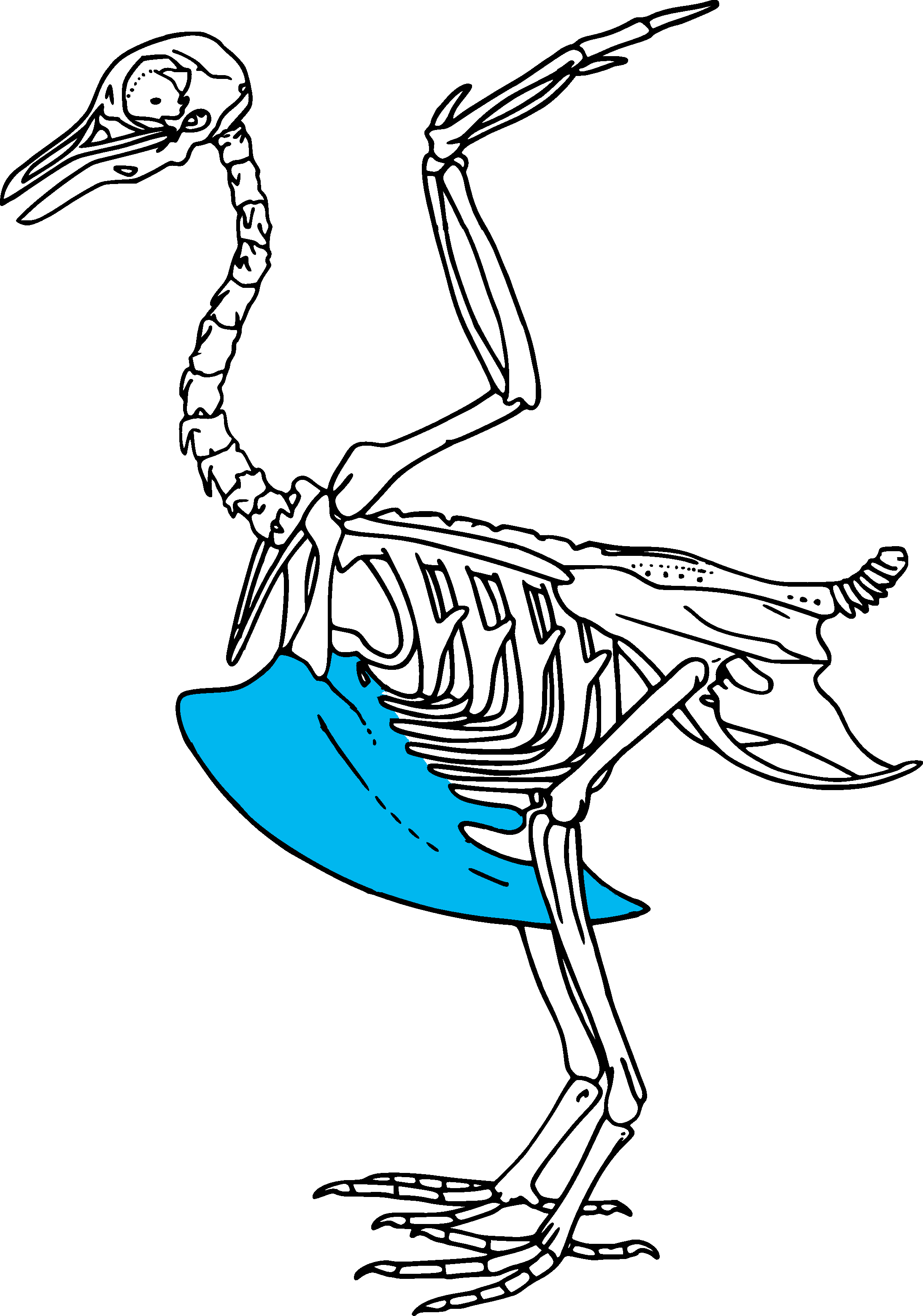
Bréchet, keel sternum

Carinatae is the group of all birds and their extinct relatives to possess a keel, or "carina", on the underside of the breastbone used to anchor large flight muscles.

== Definition ==
Traditionally, Carinatae were defined as all birds whose sternum (breast bone) has a keel (carina). The keel is a strong median ridge running down the length of the sternum. This is an important area for the attachment of flight muscles. Thus, all flying birds have a pronounced keel. Ratites, all of which are flightless, lack a strong keel. Thus, living birds were divided into carinatae (keeled) and ratites (from ratis, "raft", referring to the flatness of the sternum). The difficulty with this scheme phylogenetically was that some flightless birds, without strong keels, are descended directly from ordinary flying birds possessing one. Examples include the kākāpō, a flightless parrot, and the dodo, a columbiform (the pigeon family). Neither of these birds are a ratite. Thus, this supposedly distinctive feature was easy to use, but had nothing to do with actual phylogenetic relationship.

Beginning in the 1980s, Carinatae was given several phylogenetic definitions. The first was as a node-based clade uniting Ichthyornis with modern birds. However, in many analyses, this definition would be synonymous with the more widely used name Ornithurae. An alternate definition was provided in 2001, naming Carinatae an apomorphy-based clade defined by the presence of a keeled sternum.

The most primitive known bird relative with a keeled breastbone is Confuciusornis. While some specimens of this stem-bird have flat breastbones, some show a small ridge that could have supported a cartilaginous keel.
