= Aulacodont =

Extinct mammals characterized by grooved teeth

An aulacodont is an animal in which the dentition is arranged within grooves rather than individual sockets (like in thecodonty) or without bone encasement (like in acrodonts and pleurodonts). It is known from several aquatic amniotes: ichthyosaurs, Hesperornis, Ichthyornis, juvenile caimans, some cetaceans and even some ctenochasmatoid pterosaurs.
