= Keel (bird anatomy) =

Extension of the sternum

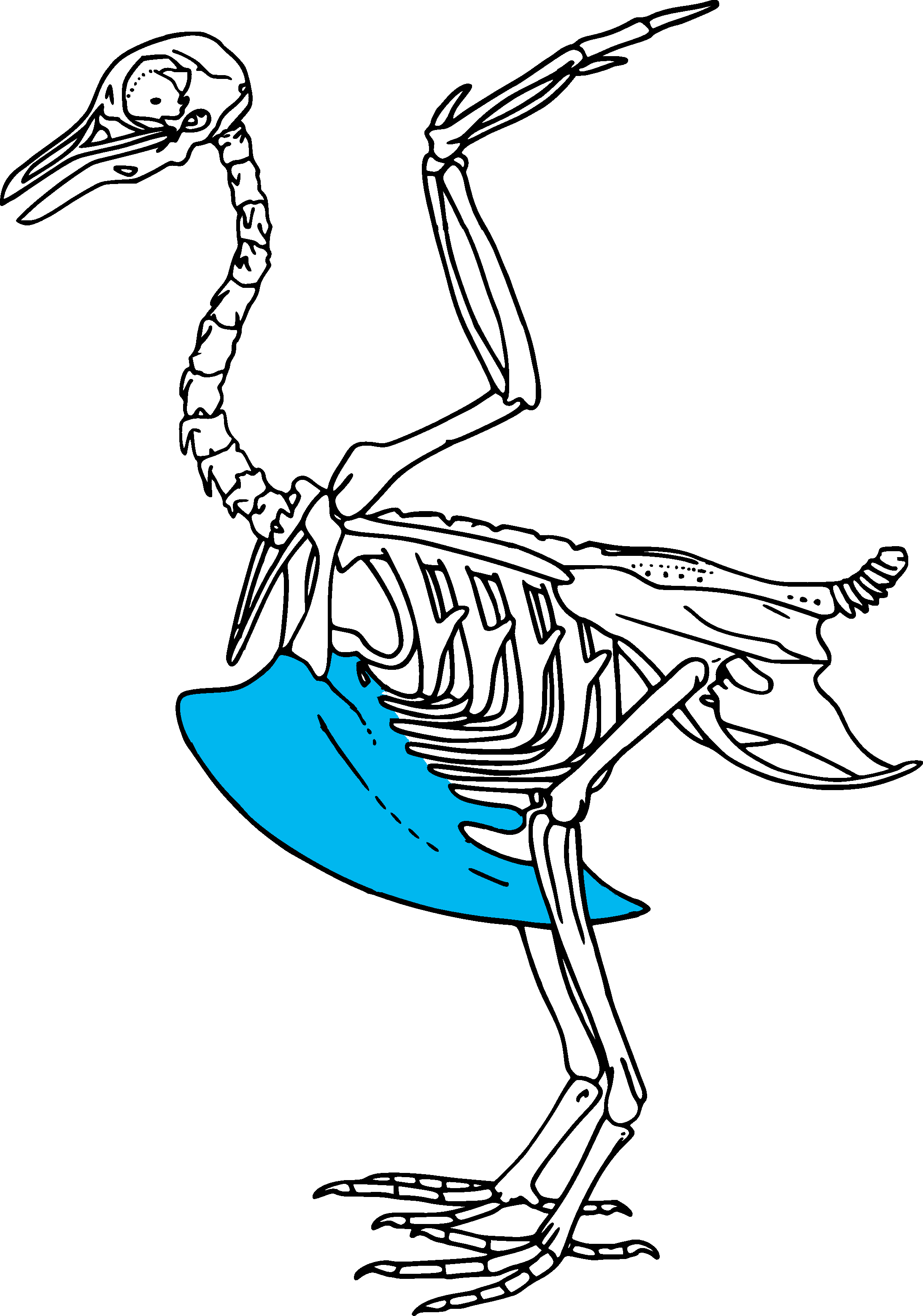
Bird skeleton with keel bone in blue.

In bird anatomy, the keel or carina (pl.: carinae) is an extension of the sternum (breastbone) which runs axially along the midline of the sternum and extends outward, perpendicular to the plane of the ribs. The keel provides an anchor to which the supracoracoideus (the muscle responsible for the upstroke) and pectoralis (the muscle responsible for the downstroke) attach, thereby providing adequate leverage for flight. Not all birds have keels; in particular, some flightless birds lack a keel structure. Some flightless birds have a keel, such as the penguin; this is because penguins still require strong wing muscles to power underwater movement.

Historically, the presence or absence of a pronounced keel structure was used as a broad classification of birds into two orders: Carinatae (from carina, "keel"), having a pronounced keel; and ratites (from ratis, "raft" – referring to the flatness of the sternum), having a subtle keel structure or lacking one entirely. However, this classification has become disused as evolutionary studies have shown that many flightless birds have evolved from flighted birds.

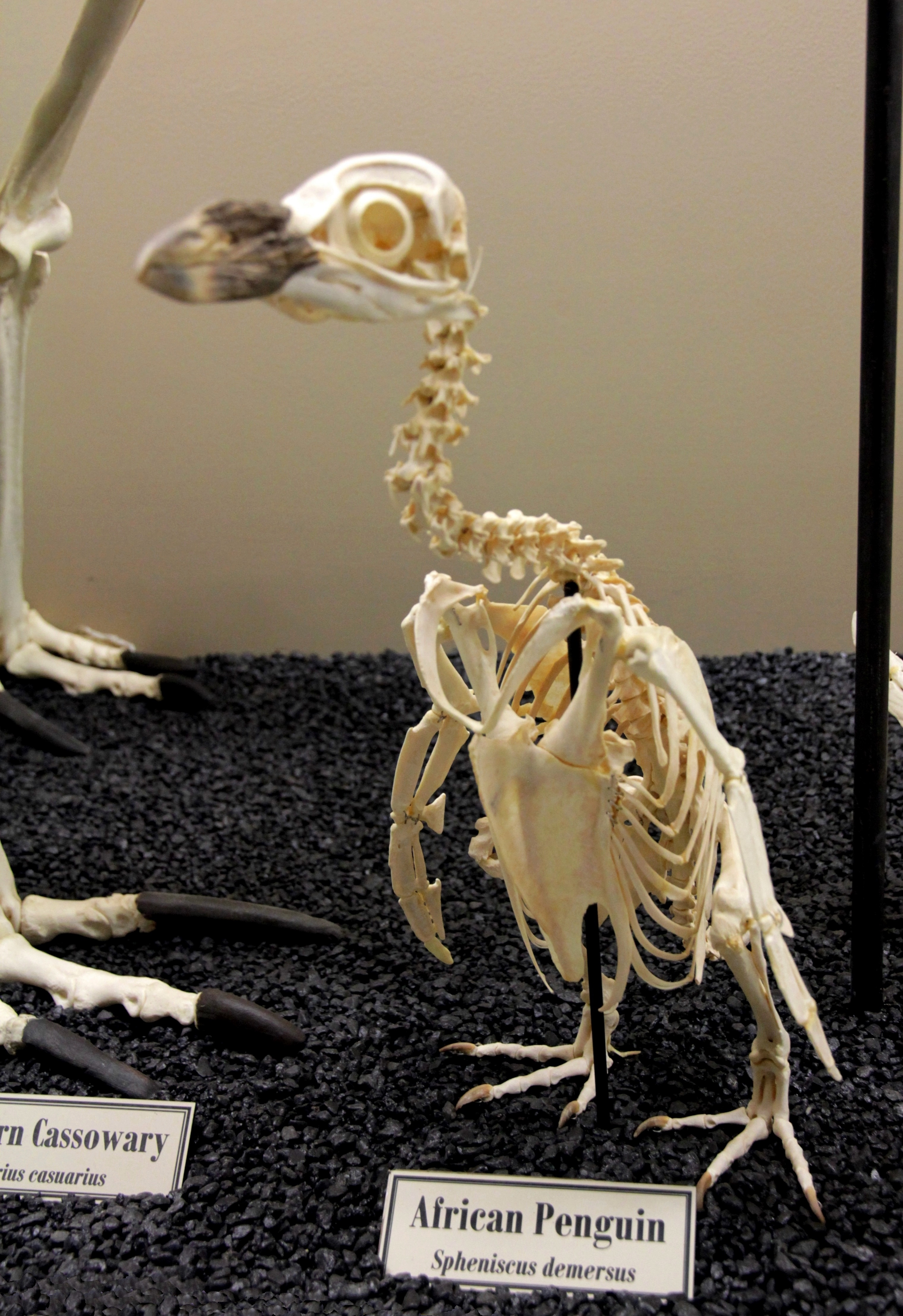
Skeleton of an African penguin, possessing a keel, on display at the Museum of Osteology

== See also ==
- Bird skeleton
- Ornithology
