= Austinornis =

Austinornis Temporal range: Coniacian–Santonian

Scientific classification
- Kingdom: Animalia
- Phylum: Chordata
- Class: Reptilia
- Clade: Dinosauria
- Clade: Saurischia
- Clade: Theropoda
- Clade: Avialae
- Clade: Ornithuromorpha
- Clade: Ornithurae
- Genus: †Austinornis; Clarke, 2004

Type species
- †Austinornis lentus (Clarke, 2004)

Synonyms
- Ichthyornis lentus (Marsh, 1877)

Extinct genus of birds

Austinornis is an extinct genus of prehistoric ornithuran of uncertain phylogenetic placement from the Late Cretaceous of Texas. The paleontologist Julia A. Clarke named the genus in 2004 based on a partial tarsometatarsus fossil from Austin Chalk. Although Austinornis was thought to be a pangalliform, other researchers have disputed its classification and dismissed it in phylogenetic analyses due to the fragmentary nature of the holotype. Notably, in 2014, Gerald Mayr suggested that Austinornis is a non-neornithine from the Coniacian or Santonian age and that the specimen probably belongs to the ornithurine Apatornis or Iaceornis.
