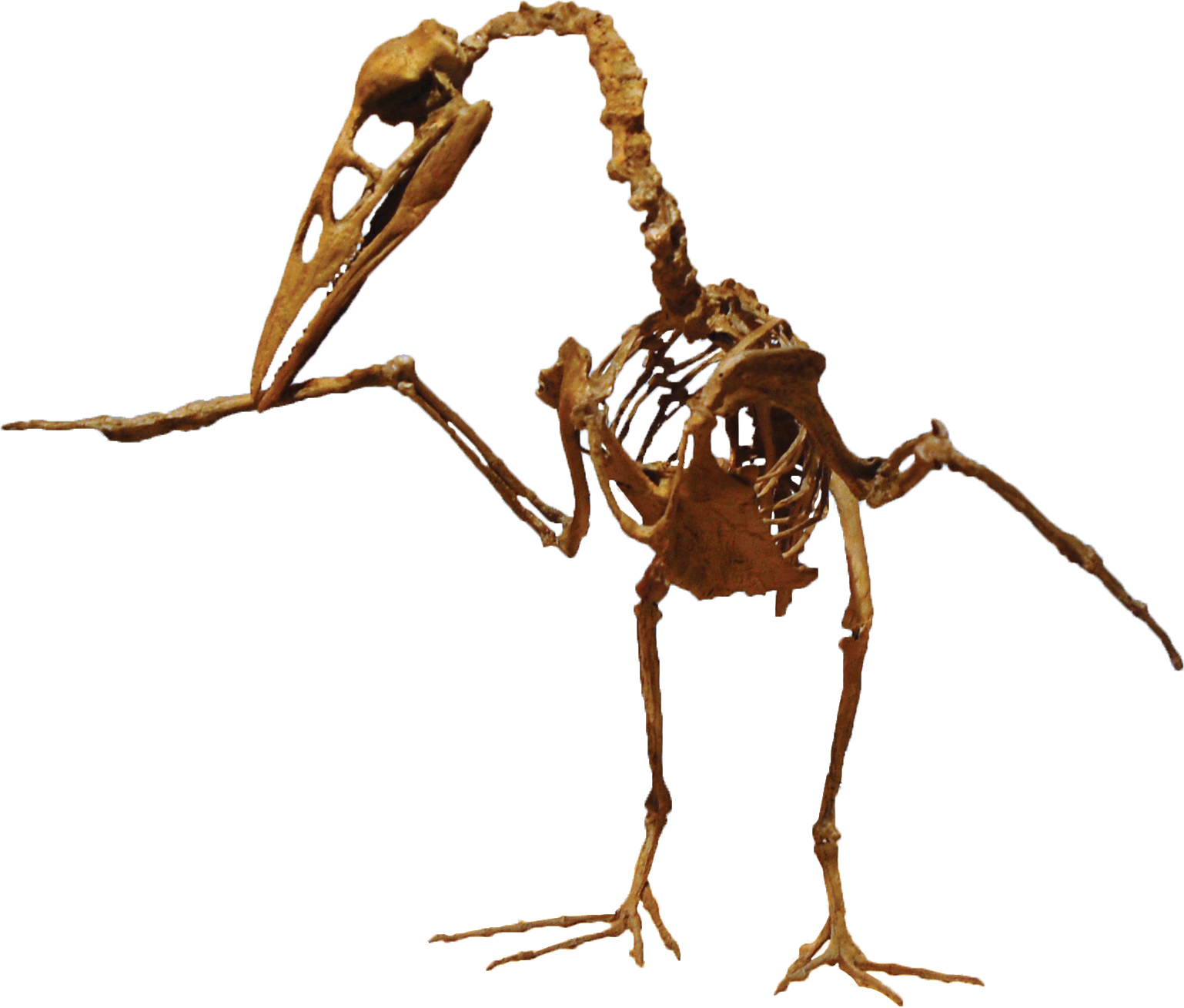
- Cast skeleton of Ichthyornis dispar, Rocky Mountain Dinosaur Resource Center
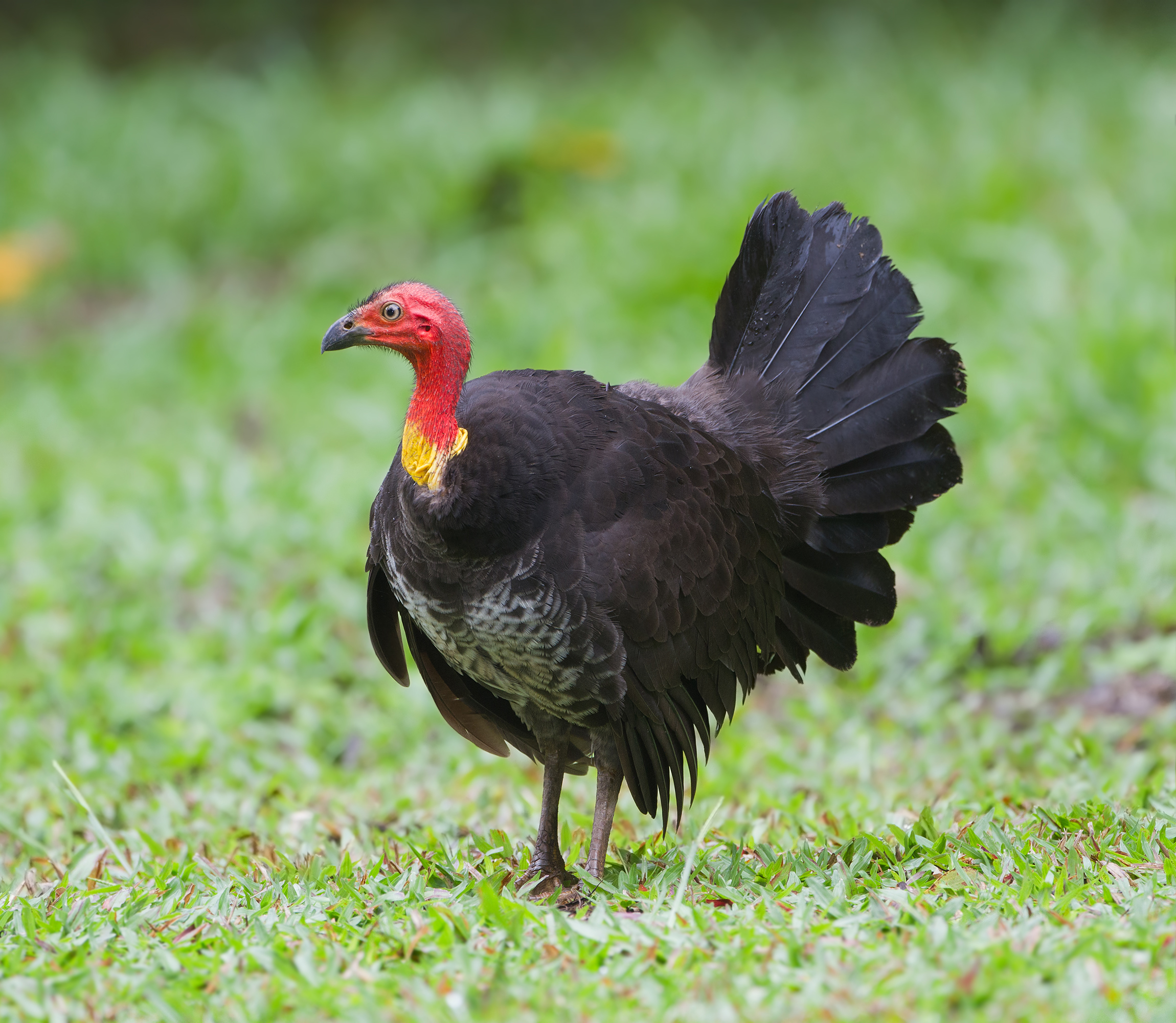
- Australian brushturkey (Alectura lathami)

Scientific classification
- Kingdom: Animalia
- Phylum: Chordata
- Class: Reptilia
- Clade: Dinosauria
- Clade: Saurischia
- Clade: Theropoda
- Clade: Avialae
- Clade: Ornithuromorpha
- Clade: Ornithurae; Haeckel, 1866

Subgroups
- †Antarcticavis?; †Apatornis; †Austinornis; †Cerebavis; †Gallornis; †Gargantuavis?; †Guildavis; †Iaceornis; †Kookne; †Limenavis; †Qinornis; †Tingmiatornis; †Hesperornithes; †Ichthyornithes; †Cimolopterygidae; Aves (modern birds)

= Ornithurae =

Ornithurans Temporal range: Early Cretaceous - Present, 130–0 Ma

Clade of dinosaurs

Ornithurae (meaning "bird tails" in Greek) is a natural group that includes modern birds and their very close relatives such as the ichthyornithines and the hesperornithines. This clade is defined in the PhyloCode by Juan Benito and colleagues in 2022 as "the smallest clade containing Ichthyornis dispar, Hesperornis regalis, and Vultur gryphus."

== Classification ==
Ernst Haeckel coined the name in 1866 and included in the group all "true birds" with the "characteristic tail morphology of all extant birds" (translation by Jacques Gauthier). This distinguishes the group from Archaeopteryx, which Haeckel placed in another new group called Sauriurae. Said simply, modern birds have short, fused pygostyle tails, while Archaeopteryx retained the long tail characteristic of non-avian theropod dinosaurs.

Gauthier converted Ornithurae into a clade, giving it a branch-based definition: "extant birds and all other taxa, such as Ichthyornis and Hesperornithes, that are closer to extant birds than is Archaeopteryx". Later he and de Queiroz redefined it as an apomorphy-based clade more in keeping with Haeckel's original usage, including the first pan-avian with a "bird tail" homologous with that of Vultur gryphus, and all of its descendants. They defined "bird tail" as a tail that is shorter than the femur, with a pygostyle that is a ploughshare-shaped, compressed element, with the bones fused in the adult, composed of less than six caudal vertebrae, and shorter than the free part of the tail, which itself is composed of less than eight caudal vertebrae. They included Aves (which they defined as the "crown group" of modern birds), Ichthyornis, Hesperornithes, and Apsaravis in Ornithurae.

Neornithes was originally proposed as a replacement for Ornithurae by Gadow in 1892 and 1893. Gauthier and de Queiroz, therefore, consider Neornithes a junior synonym of Ornithurae, though many other scientists use Neornithes to refer to the much more restrictive crown group consisting only of modern birds (a group for which Gauthier uses the name Aves). Alternately, some researchers have used Ornithurae to refer to a more restrictive node-based clade, anchored on Hesperornis and modern birds.

=== Relationships ===
The cladogram below is the result of a 2017 analysis by McLachlan and colleagues.

- Ornithurae
  - †Hesperornithes
  - - †Ichthyornithes
      - †Ichthyornis dispar
      - †Ornithurine D
    - - †Iaceornis marshi
      - - †Vegaviidae
          - †Maaqwi cascadensis
          - †Vegavis iaai
        - - †Cimolopteryx minima
          - †Cimolopteryx petra
          - †Cimolopteryx rara
          - †Ornithurine A
          - †Ornithurine E
          - - †Ceramornis major
            - †Cimolopteryx maxima
            - †Ornithurine B
            - †Ornithurine C
            - †Ornithurine F
          - Aves
