= Othniel Charles Marsh =

American paleontologist (1831–1899)

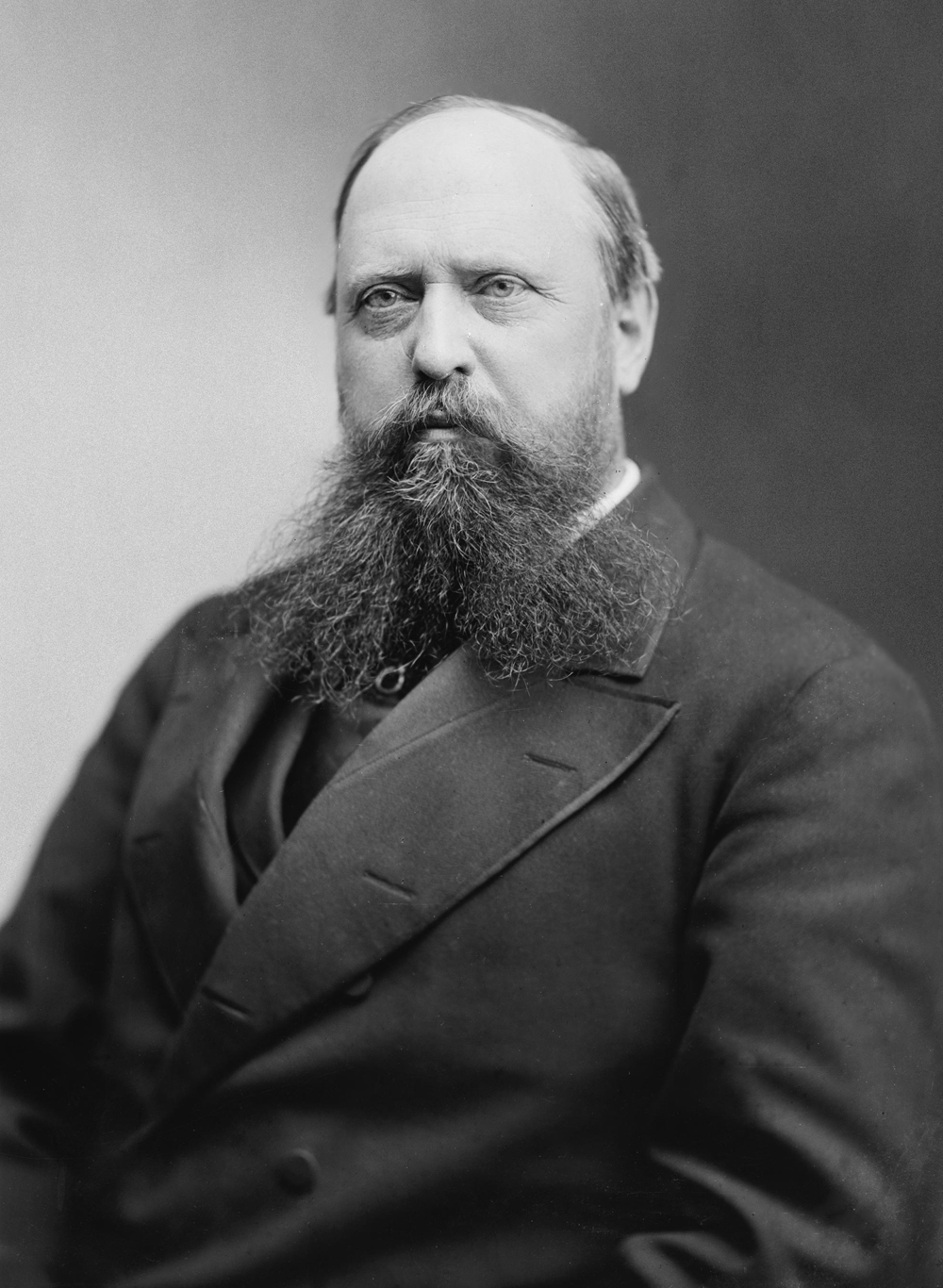
- Marsh, 1865–1880
- Born: October 29, 1831; Lockport, New York, United States
- Died: March 18, 1899 (aged 67); New Haven, Connecticut, United States
- Education: Yale College (BA, MA); University of Berlin; Heidelberg University; University of Breslau
- Awards: Bigsby Medal (1877)
- Scientific career
- Fields: Paleontology
- Workplaces: Yale University

Othniel Charles Marsh (October 29, 1831 – March 18, 1899) was an American professor of paleontology. A prolific fossil collector, Marsh was one of the preeminent paleontologists of the nineteenth century. Among his legacies are the discovery or description of dozens of new dinosaurs—including Stegosaurus and Triceratops—and theories on the origins of birds. He spent his academic career at Yale College and was president of the National Academy of Sciences.

Born into a modest family, Marsh was able to afford higher education thanks to the generosity of his wealthy uncle George Peabody. After graduating from Yale College in 1860 he traveled the world, studying anatomy, mineralogy and geology. He obtained a teaching position at Yale upon his return. From the 1870s to 1890s, he competed with rival paleontologist Edward Drinker Cope in a period of frenzied Western American expeditions known as the Bone Wars. Marsh's greatest legacy is the collection of Mesozoic reptiles, Cretaceous birds, and Mesozoic and Tertiary mammals that now constitute the backbone of the collections of Yale's Peabody Museum of Natural History and the Smithsonian Institution. Marsh has been called "both a superb paleontologist and the greatest proponent of Darwinism in nineteenth-century America."

== Biography ==
=== Early life and family ===
Othniel Charles Marsh (Note: Marsh did not go by his given name after childhood, with Othniel omitted from his passport entirely, and preferred "O. C.") was born on October 29, 1831, near Lockport, New York. He was the third of four children born to Mary Gaines Peabody (1807–1834) and Caleb Marsh (1800–1865). The Marsh (nee Marshe) family and Peabody families immigrated to America from England in the 1630s. Mary died shortly after the birth of her fourth child in 1834. Caleb remarried in 1836 and Othniel moved with the family to Bradford, Massachusetts. Soon after, Caleb's business fortunes soured, and Othniel's early years were marked by financial struggles.

Caleb purchased a farm in Lockport when Marsh was twelve. As the eldest son, Othniel was expected to assist his father on the farm, and the two had a contentious relationship. Othniel much preferred excursions in the woods to his chores. Among his childhood influences was Ezekiel Jewett, a former military officer and amateur scientist who fostered Othniel's interest in the sciences. Jewett had been drawn to the area by the fossils unearthed by the enlargement of the Erie Canal, and the two would hunt and prospect for specimens together.

By 1847, Othniel was attending school at the Wilson Collegiate Institute, and later attended the Lockport Union School. Othniel was undecided as to what he would do for a living, but his future was dramatically changed due to the intervention of his uncle George Peabody, a successful banker. With Peabody's financial assistance (spurred by Marsh's aunt, Judith), Marsh enrolled in Phillips Academy in 1851. Older than most of the other students, he was nicknamed "Daddy" by his peers. He was initially an unremarkable student, devoting much of his time to leisure and games, but the next year decided to focus on his studies. "I changed my mind," he later told a biographer, "during an afternoon spent on Dracut Heights [Lowell]. I resolved that I would return to Andover, take hold, and really study." (Note: Author Mark Jaffe suggests Marsh's sudden change in mindset was sparked by the death of his sister Mary, who died at age 23, almost the same age as his mother.)

Marsh applied himself to his studies and graduated valedictorian of his class in 1856. In the summers off of school, he prospected for minerals in New York, Massachusetts and Nova Scotia. Upon graduation, Marsh decided to attend Yale, rather than Harvard, where many of his relatives had attended. He ran his letter to George Peabody asking for the funds by Judith first, who disapprovingly noted it contained two spelling errors. Peabody agreed to cover Marsh's expenses and give him an allowance for spending money, and Marsh moved to New Haven in September. Marsh was a good student, but not a thrifty one; Judith, who was in charge of monitoring Marsh while Peabody was in Europe, regularly upbraided her nephew for his lax accounting habits and large expenses. Marsh graduated eighth in his class, using a scholarship he won for the best examination in Greek to finance a master's degree from Yale's Sheffield Scientific School, as he developed an interest in becoming a professor of science. While in graduate school, Marsh published his first scientific papers on minerals and vertebrate fossils from his Nova Scotia trips, which possibly inspired Marsh's interest in vertebrate paleontology. He obtained his master's degree in 1862.

=== European travels and return to Yale ===
Following school, Marsh declined a professorship at Yale (Note: Biographers Charles Schuchert and Clara Mae LeVene say that the story of the professorship is "probably true" as Marsh included it in an outline of his life, but that there was no confirming record of such an offer.) and instead took a tour of Europe; it is possible the trip was to avoid being drafted into the American Civil War, although he might have also been disqualified from service on account of his eyesight. Marsh traveled through England, France, Germany and Switzerland, studying with or making the acquaintance of prominent scientists such as Heinrich Ernst Beyrich, Wilhelm Peters, Christian Gottfried Ehrenberg and Henry Woodward. In discussions with his uncle, Marsh convinced the businessman to fund a natural history museum at Yale. While studying at the University of Berlin in late 1863, the 32-year-old Marsh first met 25-year-old Edward Drinker Cope, who was also on a scientific tour of Europe. Cope had much less formal schooling than Marsh, but had already published thirty-seven papers. The two Americans spent a few days together and would become friends.

After a salmon fishing excursion with Peabody in Ireland, Marsh returned to America in July or August 1865. Marsh had expected Peabody's gift would have resulted in a position at Yale, but it took until 1866 when Yale established a chair of paleontology at the university. Marsh was given the position, but no salary was attached; biographer George Bird Grinnell suggested that this suited Marsh just fine, as he was more interested in research than teaching. The Yale position was notable because Marsh became the first professor of paleontology in the USA, thus spearheading a renaissance in this field which was hitherto limited to being a hobby of wealthy men and lagging behind Europe. Marsh's own interests shifted to paleontology, and after 1869 his other scientific contributions had mostly ceased.

During his travels abroad, Marsh had kept correspondence with Elizabeth Cogswell Dixon, the wife of senator James Dixon. Elizabeth had functioned as Marsh's aunt during the late 1850s, and tried to direct Marsh's attention to a number of "pretty persons" to marry, most heavily her niece, Constance Kinney. Marsh's interest was instead held by Dixon's eldest daughter, Clementine, who had before his European trips rebuffed his advances. Upon returning from his travels, Marsh again tried and failed to win her hand. He would seriously pursue only one other woman, the daughter of railroad magnate John W. Garrett, but was similarly rebuffed, Marsh's friends noting that he "lacked the light touch so helpful in social intercourse." He would instead remain a lifelong bachelor.

=== Trips west ===
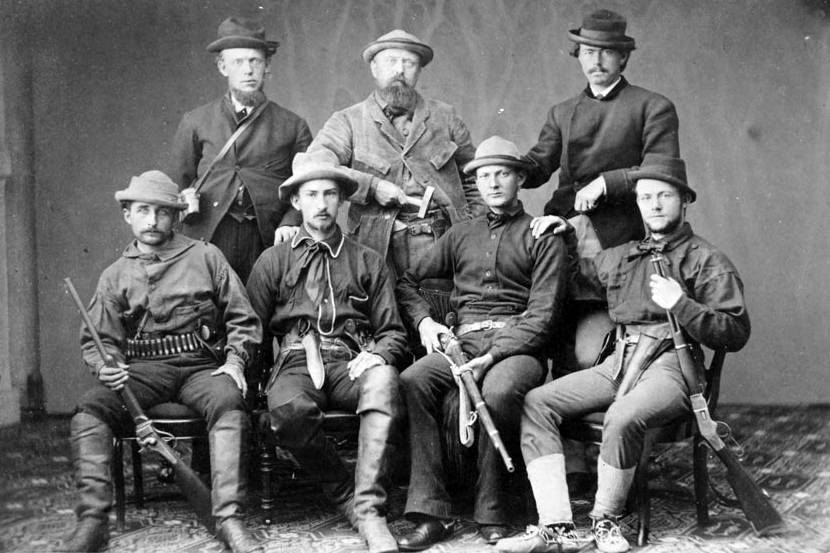
Othniel Marsh (center, back row) and assistants ready for digging in 1872

While teaching, Marsh toured the country, visiting museums to inform the planning of the Yale Museum. In 1868, he visited Cope; since their meeting, they had expressed warm wishes in letters to each other and even named species after each other. Cope took Marsh on a tour of the marl pits in New Jersey where he was finding fossils; unbeknownst to Cope, Marsh would later pay the pit operators to divert their finds to him instead. Marsh later noted that Cope's reconstruction of his newest find, the aquatic reptile Elasmosaurus, was flawed: Cope had placed the head of the animal where its tail should have been. Marsh's criticism wrankled Cope, and threatened his nascent career; he responded by critiquing errors in Marsh's work, and moving in on areas Marsh was prospecting in. Their relationship began to sour.

Marsh was looking further afield than New Jersey for fossils. While still studying in Europe, Marsh had identified the western American frontier as "the most inviting field for Paleontology in North America". In 1868, after visiting Chicago for a meeting of the American Association for the Advancement of Sciences, Marsh elected to join other members to Omaha on a "geological excursion"; it was Marsh's first trip to the far western United States, and it inspired him to return to prospect.

Plans for a prospecting trip were delayed due to conflict with Native American tribes, and Marsh's first trip started west from New Haven on June 30, 1870. The prospecting groups were formed from Yale students or recent graduates. Their path took them through Nebraska, Wyoming, Colorado, Utah, all the way to San Francisco, then back to Kansas. They were regularly escorted by companies of soldiers, including Buffalo Bill Cody and Frank North. They arrived back in New Haven on December 18. The expedition uncovered more than a hundred new species of vertebrate fossils. Marsh's papers on his finds, particularly a species of Pterosaur larger than any previously known, provided a major boost to his career. Also valuable were the personal relationships Marsh forged, the publicity the expedition had received, and the growing attention at the market for bones in the west—bones Marsh was willing to pay for.

Expeditions to areas old and new followed in 1871, 1872, and 1873. Marsh was soon joined by other scientific parties. Cope traveled to western Kansas to prospect in 1871. John Wesley Powell, Ferdinand Vandeveer Hayden and Clarence King were also traversing the American West on geological surveys. King would forward bones he found to his friend Marsh. Cope's trips into areas Marsh considered "his" territory caused their relationship to become hostile. They began attacking each other in scientific papers for perceived errors in classification or falsified publication dates, embroiling other scientists like Hayden, Joseph Leidy, and Louis Agassiz in their spats. Marsh was admitted to the membership of the National Academy of Sciences in 1872, with Cope the lone member who voted against him.

Marsh had not originally intended to do field work in 1874; by this point, he had at least twelve different groups hunting for bones on his behalf, and the Peabody Museum was under construction. Marsh was nonetheless induced to join a prospecting trip to the Black Hills of the Dakotas by personal invitation from General Edward Ord. Leaving late in the season and anticipating danger from Native Americans, Marsh relied on hired frontiersman and brought no students with him. When Marsh arrived at the Red Cloud Agency in November, the agency and tribes were locked in conflict over the matter of a Sioux census, with the lead agent refusing to disburse the tribes' annual goods without one. Marsh put his request to prospect to the council of chiefs, who considered his claim to be prospecting for fossils dubious, amid illegal gold speculation in the area sparked by George Custer's expedition into the Black Hills. While he initially got assent for the expedition, weather delays and a change in temperament led Marsh's party to withdraw to Fort Robinson, threatened by Sioux on the way. Unwilling to turn back, Marsh feted the chiefs at a banquet and again obtained permission to leave. Marsh agreed to deliver Chief Red Cloud's reports of missing supplies and corrupt government agents to Congress. (Note: Before leaving for back east, Marsh would inspect Red Cloud's claims, taking samples of the low-quality supplies as proof. Previous government investigations had found that the Indian Bureau and the contractors that supplied the government were indeed engaged in widespread cheating and corruption.) Heading north to reach the edge of the Dakota badlands, Marsh's men started prospecting for fossils. The fact that they were in fact after bones and not gold led the natives employed on the expedition to call Marsh "Big Bone Chief". Warned by scouts that a hostile group of Miniconjou were planning an attack, Marsh stayed long enough to properly pack the expedition's finds before retreating south. The Miniconjou war party missed catching the expedition by less than a day.

Marsh made good on his promise in March 1875, heading to Washington and meeting with Indian Affairs commissioner Edward Parmelee Smith. Unsatisfied with Smith's explanations, Marsh arranged a meeting with President Ulysses S. Grant. Marsh was then summoned to meeting of the Board of Indian Commissioners in New York City, to which he brought a reporter, Frank Wyckoff, who wrote about the meeting in an April 30 story for the New-York Tribune. The scandal was soon overshadowed by an even greater one for the Grant Administration, the Whiskey Ring, but Marsh remained committed, publishing a 36-page pamphlet of charges and evidence in July and testifying before a special commission formed to investigate the charges. Counterattacks painted Marsh as either taken in by the natives or taking their side for his own gain—access to fossils. The special commission's report, released in October, substantiated Marsh's charges and resulted in resignations and reorganization, but did little to change government policy towards the natives. Modern scholars argue that Marsh's motives were not philanthropic, as he submitted to the generally held view of the superiority of the white race and was not fond of the native culture. Rather, his actions were likely calculated to obtain access to fossils in the Red Cloud's territory and gain publicity.

While Marsh was busy fighting the government, he continued to employ bone hunters who shipped specimens back to him, among them Benjamin Franklin Mudge and Samuel Wendell Williston. He published 19 papers on his finds between 1874 and 1876, most dealing with prehistoric mammals. He did not return west himself until 1879. In 1876, his reputation in the field was cemented during the visit by Thomas Henry Huxley, Darwin's most prominent early supporter. Huxley examined the remains of Tertiary horses amassed in the Peabody museum and realized the sequence was a prime example for gradual changing of body structure from dog-like ancestors with three hooves to modern horses. It also convinced the British naturalist that the early evolution of the horse took place in North America, not Europe as was thought previously.

=== Bone Wars ===
In early April 1877, schoolteacher and amateur geologist Arthur Lakes wrote a letter to Marsh about large bones he had found while prospecting with a friend in the vicinity of Morrison, Colorado. Lakes began uncovering more massive fossils with the help of some students. He sent a batch of bones to Marsh unprompted, but after receiving no answer to his letters, Lakes wrote to Cope as well. Unaware of the animosity and politicking between the two scientists, Lakes' actions sparked what author Mark Jaffe called "the paleontological equivalent of the California gold rush of 1849", now known as the Bone Wars.

Marsh belatedly sent word back to Lakes on June 9, reaching him out west on the 20th. Enclosing a check for $100 (equivalent to $3,023 in 2025), Marsh asked Lakes to keep word of the find a secret; Lakes replied that he had already heard back from Cope, who had immediately written back offering money, and Lakes had already sent fossils on to Marsh's rival in Philadelphia. The news that Cope had some of the fossils spurred Marsh into action; he telegraphed Lakes back and sent word to Mudge to head to Morrison and supervise the dig. Previous to this, Marsh had spent very little time or attention on dinosaur finds. Mudge arrived in the area on June 29, armed with code words to obscure their communiques from Cope, and Marsh sent another agent to Philadelphia to pick up the bones Lakes had sent to Cope.

Lakes's find was the first of several discoveries of large dinosaur bones out west in 1877. A naturalist O. W. Lucas wrote Cope about bones he had found while collecting plants near Cañon City, Colorado; though Marsh got word of the finds and routed Williston there to set up a rival dig, Williston reported that Lucas, by now in Cope's employ, was getting the best large fossils. Williston did manage to persuade Lucas that smaller specimens, including one of what looked like a bird, could go to Marsh, and among these fossils Marsh described the diminutive Nanosaurus. Marsh would be luckier with another letter that was sent to him in July, from two men near Como Bluff, Wyoming, reporting on the bones they had discovered there; they forwarded some of their discovered bones to Marsh as well. Marsh reacted immediately, sending Williston to meet and employ the men, William Harlow Reed and William Edwards Carlin, and their contract included the provision that they take care to "keep all other collectors"—namely, Cope or his men—out of the area and away from the finds.

The area around Como Bluff turned out to be one of the richest deposits of dinosaur specimens in the world, and the discoveries would form the core of the paleontology collections for the Peabody Museum, as well as the National Museum of Natural History. At Peabody, Marsh built a team to handle the process of unpacking, sorting, and documentation, but was reluctant to give anyone else credit for the work. Among the dinosaurs Marsh described were Allosaurus, Stegosaurus, and Apatosaurus, and he devised the classification for the herbivorous giants he and Cope were discovering—sauropods. Marsh's agents sent back some thirty tons of fossils in their first year of digging, and he expected even more results in 1878, as he expanded his roster of bonehunters.

Marsh was elected vice president of the National Academy of Sciences in 1878, making him interim president when Joseph Henry died on May 13. At the time Marsh was in Europe, but he cut his trip short as it became clear that Secretary of the Interior Carl Schurz was invested in finally reforming the government's haphazard surveying process. With Marsh and his friends King and Powell steering plans, they were able to consolidate the surveys into the U.S. Geological Survey (USGS) that they controlled—freezing out Hayden, and by extension Hayden's friend Cope.

Learning of the finds at Como Bluff, Cope employed his own men there to find bones—including William Edwards Carlin, who had grown tired of Marsh's stinginess and late pay, a reoccurring grievance among Marsh's employees. The relationship with Carlin and Reed, who remained loyal to Marsh, fell apart, and Carlin monopolized the rail station house and forced Reed to prepare his fossils outside. As competition from Cope and other bonehunters increased, Marsh sent Lakes to assist Reed, and Marsh would visit Como Bluff himself in June 1879. Marsh supposedly told his agents to smash fossils rather than let them fall into Cope's hands, though Reed and Lakes might have falsified the tales of their destruction. The Marsh workers were continually at odds, fighting between themselves and Marsh; Lakes and Reed chafed at working together, leading Marsh to assign them separate dig sites. Williston quit Marsh's employ and switched sides to Cope. Marsh's men would prospect at Como Bluff until 1889, maintaining an edge in gathering the fossils there.

=== Later career ===
After King resigned as head of the USGS, Powell took control and set about reorganizing it by speciality, creating a position of "Vertebrate Paleontologist" that Marsh would occupy from 1882 to 1892. Marsh had been reluctant to take the job, as the fossils he found while with the USGS would belong to the government, and not to him. Powell likely made a gentleman's agreement with Marsh that he could retain certain specimens to entice him to accept the offer. In return, Marsh was given about $150,000 over the course of a decade (equivalent to $5,004,310 in 2025) to collect, catalog, and publish his finds.

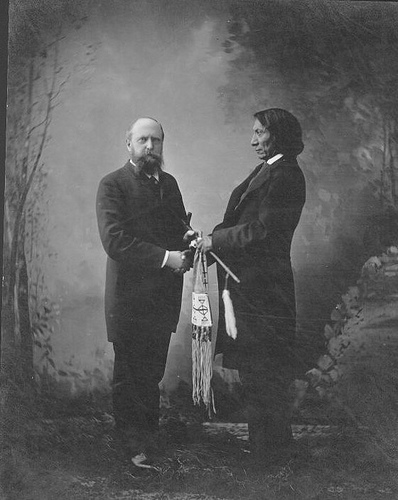
Marsh and Lakota Chief Red Cloud in New Haven, Connecticut, c. 1880

The 1880s were a successful decade for Marsh, while his rival Cope suffered from failed mining investments and was unable to secure a teaching position. Marsh was elected to presiding officer of the National Academy of Sciences in 1883. He received honorary degrees from Harvard University and Heidelberg University in 1886. He built an 18-room mansion for himself on Prospect Hill near the Peabody Museum, where he hosted notable guests including Red Cloud, Alfred Russel Wallace and Alexander Graham Bell. Marsh caught the attention of the scientific world with the 1880 publication of Odontornithes: a Monograph on Extinct Birds of North America, which included his discoveries of birds with teeth. These skeletons helped bridge the gap between dinosaurs and birds, and provided invaluable support for Charles Darwin's theory of evolution. Darwin wrote to Marsh saying, "Your work on these old birds & on the many fossil animals of N. America has afforded the best support to the theory of evolution, which has appeared within the last 20 years" (since Darwin's publication of Origin of Species). However Marsh's scientific output began to slow considerably, which biographers Charles Schuchert and Clara LeVene attributed to the sheer mass of bones he had procured.

After Cope was forced to give up bones he had gathered as a volunteer during his time on the Hayden survey, he switched to attacking Marsh through the press. Having spent years gathering up evidence and complaints from Marsh's disgruntled assistants, Cope, through reporter William Hosea Ballou, launched a series of attacks on Marsh and Powell in the pages of the The New York Herald, starting in January 1890. What had once been a feud confined to the scientific community became national news, as papers including the New York Times and Philadelphia Inquirer picked up the story. Marsh took a week to prepare a rebuttal, collating and then picking apart Cope's arguments one by one. According to Henry Fairfield Osborn, Marsh won the exchanges by countering Cope's scattershot hostility with an air of dignity. More specific accusations were fielded by two of Marsh's former assistants in the pages of the American Naturalist, but the story fell out of the public eye quickly. Cope's article did have an effect on congressman Hilary A. Herbert, who had long argued against what he saw as wasteful government spending on science. In May 1892 he led the efforts that sharply cut the appropriations of the USGS. Also at issue was the dispensation of the fossils gathered by the USGS, which were being held by private hands at the Peabody Museum. Powell, damaged by his involvement in Marsh's feud with Cope, asked Marsh to tender his resignation.

The loss of the survey position came at a poor time for Marsh, who would find himself in financial difficulties amid the Panic of 1893. He was forced to let go of his fossil collectors, mortgage his house, and in 1896 ask Yale for a salary. Marsh's scientific output slowed further, with George Bird Grinnell writing that "after 1895 [Marsh] seemed to lose sight of the fact that time was passing". The pinnacle of Marsh's work with dinosaurs came in 1896 with the publication of his two quartos, Dinosaurs of North America and Vertebrate Fossils. On December 13, 1897, Marsh received the Cuvier Prize from the French Academy of Sciences, only the third American to have received the honor.

By the time of a trip to Russia in 1897, Marsh was in increasingly poor health and having trouble getting around. In 1898 Marsh bequeathed his collections to Yale, writing that he hoped they would finish publishing the results of his trips west. He caught a cold while traveling back from Washington, D.C. to New Haven in February 1899, which developed into pneumonia. Marsh died on March 19, 1899 in New Haven, aged 67. He was buried at the Grove Street Cemetery. His will gave his house and its possessions to Yale, who auctioned off the contents in New York. The building is now known as Marsh Hall and occupied by the Yale School of the Environment.

== Personality and views ==
Grinnell described Marsh's success as resulting in him being "sometimes impatient, intolerant, and even autocratic," which he attributed to his lack of socialization as a boy with peers and the lack of "smoothing off of roughness" from having never married.

Even with friends he remained aloof, as one of Marsh's assistants described him as having "an absence of the complex exchange of confidence which normally exists between intimate friends."

Marsh was difficult to work for, and his staff at the Peabody Museum constantly turned over. His workers would find that Marsh grilled them about their discoveries, then wrote it down himself later and took credit. Marsh's longtime assistant, Oscar Harger, was forbidden to publish his own paleontology papers; Harger and Williston changed the focus of their scientific work entirely to go around Marsh's prohibitions.

McCarren called Marsh the greatest proponent of Darwinism in 19th-century America. In 1877 Marsh said, "I am sure I need to offer no argument for evolution; since to doubt evolution today is to doubt science, and science is only another name for truth."

Marsh was a strong advocate of the importance of type specimens, describing them as "the lights that mark the present boundaries of knowledge".

== Legacy ==
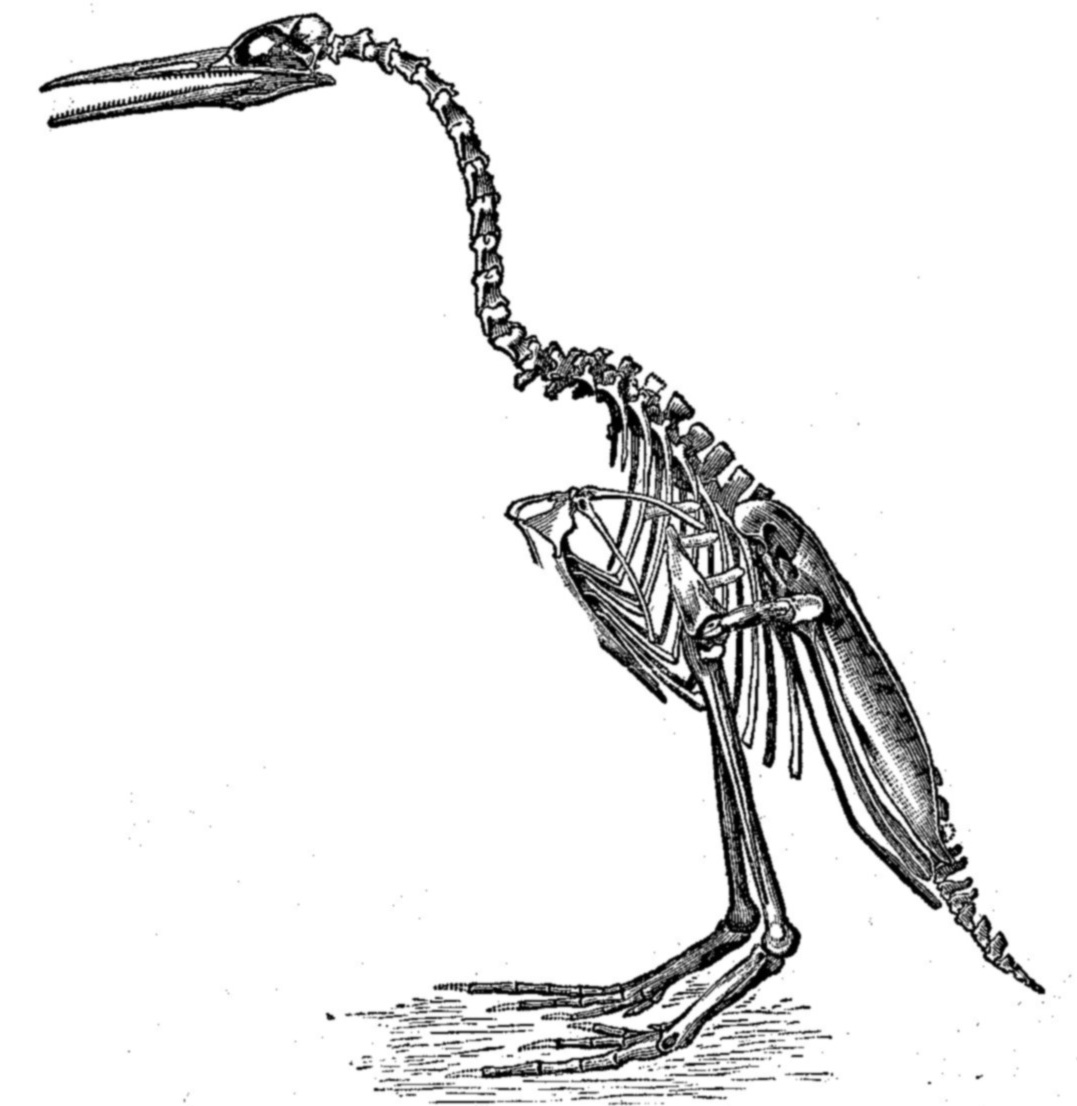
Hesperornis regalis, a species of ancient flightless bird with teeth, as drawn by Othniel Marsh, and published in his book, Odontornithes: A Monograph on the Extinct Toothed Birds of North America

According to Peter Dodson, Cope and Marsh "[have] left a legacy, and each was a distinguished researcher. But really it seems impossible to say one name without the other. Cope and Marsh." Marsh's names for three dinosaur groups and nineteen genera have survived. McCarren called Cope the only other American paleontologist who could rival Marsh's legacy. Cope and Marsh's rivalry led to a tremendous explosion in the number of known dinosaurs, but their efforts to outdo each other also created classification errors and hasty scholarship that future paleontologists had to untangle.

Marsh named the following dinosaur genera:

- Allosaurus (1877)
- Ammosaurus (1890)
- Anchisaurus (1885)
- Apatodon (1877)
- Apatornis (1873)
- Apatosaurus (1877)
- Atlantosaurus (1877)
- Barosaurus (1890)
- Brontosaurus (1879)
- Camptosaurus (1885)
- Ceratops (1888)
- Ceratosaurus (1884)
- Claosaurus (1890)
- Coelurus (1879)
- Coniornis (1893)
- Creosaurus (1878)
- Diplodocus (1878)
- Diracodon (1881)
- Dryosaurus (1894)
- Dryptosaurus (1877)
- Hesperornis (1872)
- Ichthyornis (1873)
- Labrosaurus (1896)
- Laosaurus (1878)
- Lestornis (1876)
- Nanosaurus (1877)
- Nodosaurus (1889)
- Ornithomimus (1890)
- Pleurocoelus (1891)
- Priconodon (1888)
- Stegosaurus (1877)
- Torosaurus (1891)
- Triceratops (1889)

He named the suborders Ceratopsia (1890), Ceratosauria (1884), Ornithopoda (1881), Stegosauria (1877) and Theropoda (1881).

He also named the families Allosauridae (1878), Anchisauridae (1885), Camptosauridae (1885), Ceratopsidae (1890), Ceratosauridae, Coeluridae, Diplodocidae (1884), Dryptosauridae (1890), Nodosauridae (1890), Ornithomimidae (1890), Plateosauridae (1895) and Stegosauridae (1880).

Dinosaurs named by others in honour of Marsh include Hoplitosaurus marshi (Lucas, 1901), Iaceornis marshi (Clarke, 2004), Marshosaurus (Madsen, 1976), Othnielia (Galton, 1977) and Othnielosaurus (Galton, 2007).

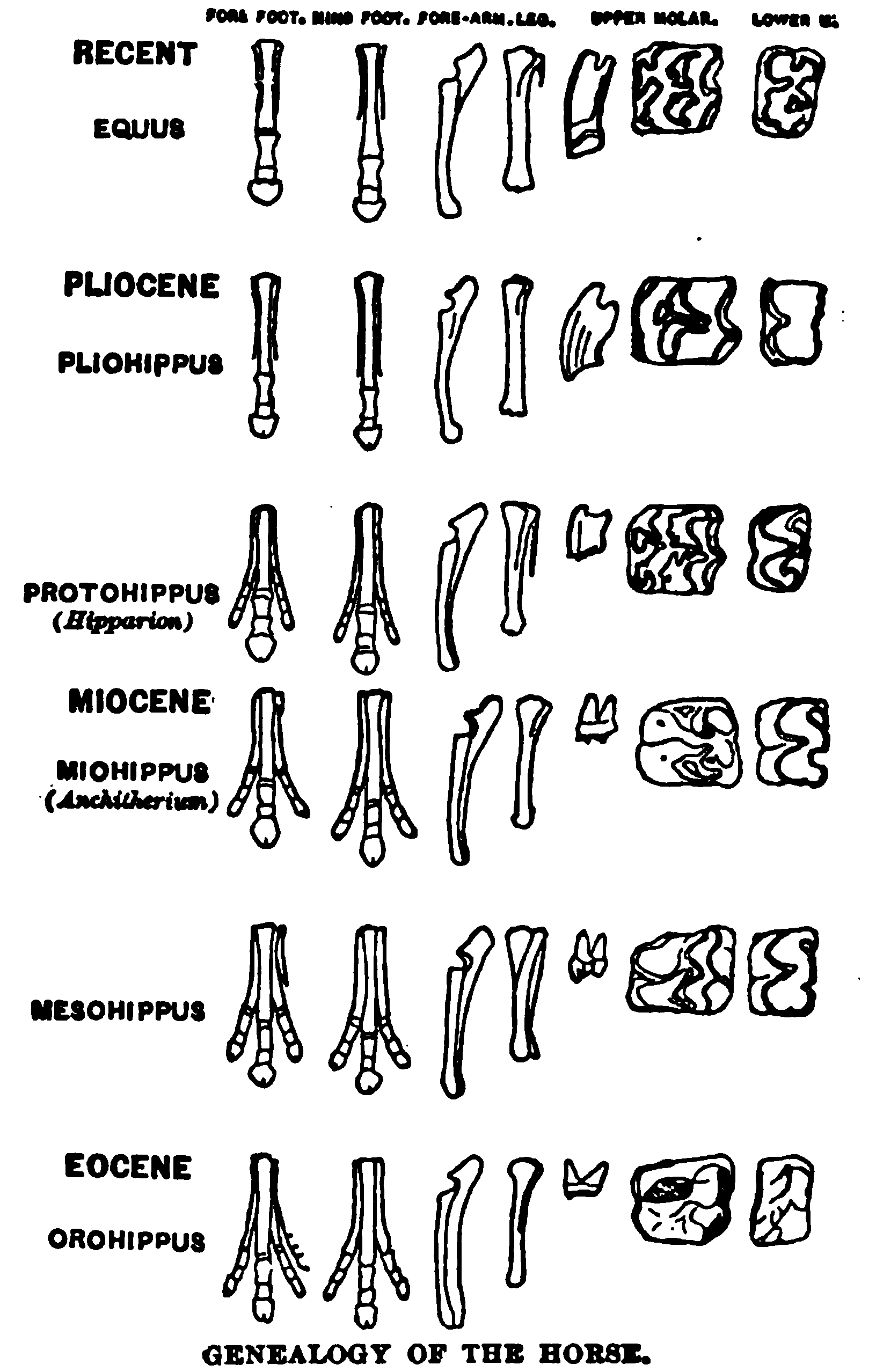
Diagram by Marsh showing evolution of horse legs and teeth over time

Marsh's finds formed the original core of the collection of Yale's Peabody Museum of Natural History. The museum's Great Hall is dominated by the first fossil skeleton of Brontosaurus that he discovered, which was reclassified as Apatosaurus for a time. However, an extensive study published in 2015 concluded that Brontosaurus was a valid genus of sauropod distinct from Apatosaurus. Prior to Marsh's efforts, the entirety of fossil remains known in North America was quite small. As a result of the generosity of George Peabody, Marsh was able to keep discovery teams in the field almost continuously from 1870 until his death. The material recovered in his 30 years of collection was simply astonishing to the scientific community. At the Peabody Museum, Marsh was the first to create skeletal displays of dinosaurs, which are now common in countless museums of natural history.

More generally, Marsh's finds provided crucial evidence in support of Darwin's theory of evolution. The fossils of early birds with teeth were the key missing link between dinosaurs and birds, while the sequence of horse fossils demonstrated gradual changing of body structure through the geologic periods. His drawing of this sequence based on leg bones and teeth remains he produced for Huxley is regarded one of the most important illustrations in the history of paleontology. He also formulated the law of brain growth, which states that, during the Tertiary period, many taxonomic groups presented gradual increase in the size of the brain. This evolutionary law remains being used due to its explanatory, and to a certain extent, predictive potential.

Marsh biographer Mark J. McCarren summed it up this way, Marsh's "contributions to the understanding of extinct reptiles, birds and mammals are unequaled in the history of paleontology."

Marsh Butte, located in the Grand Canyon, was officially named in his honor in 1906.

== Bibliography ==
- Brinkman, Paul (2010). The Second Jurassic Dinosaur Rush: Museums and Paleontology in America at the Turn of the Twentieth Century. University of Chicago Press. ISBN 978-0-226-07473-3.
- Bryson, Bill (2003). "Science Red in Tooth and Claw". A Short History of Nearly Everything. United States: Random House. ISBN 978-0-7679-0818-4.
- Davidson, Jane (1997). The Bone Sharp: The Life of Edward Drinker Cope. Academy of Natural Sciences. ISBN 978-0-910006-53-8.
- Gallagher, William B. (1997). When Dinosaurs Roamed New Jersey. New Brunswick: Rutgers University Press. ISBN 978-0-8135-2349-1.
- Grinnell, George (1910). "Othniel Charles Marsh". In Jordan, David (ed.). Leading American Men of Science. Henry Holt and Company. ISBN 978-0-598-75112-6.
- Jaffe, Mark (2000). The Gilded Dinosaur: The Fossil War Between E. D. Cope and O. C. Marsh and the Rise of American Science. New York: Crown Publishing Group. ISBN 0-517-70760-8.
- MacFadden, Bruce J. (1994). Fossil horses: systematics, paleobiology, and evolution of the family Equidae. Cambridge: Cambridge University Press. ISBN 0-521-47708-5.
- Marsh, Othniel (1878). Introduction and Succession of Vertebrate Life in America: An Address Delivered Before the American Association for the Advancement of Science, at Nashville, Tenn, August 30, 1877 (Speech). Tuttle, Morehouse & Taylor.
- McCarren, Mark J (1993). The Scientific Contributions of Othniel Charles Marsh: Birds, Bones, and Brontotheres. Peabody Museum of Natural History. ISBN 978-0-912532-32-5.
- Ostrom, John; McIntosh, John (1999). Marsh's Dinosaurs: The Collections from Como Bluff. Yale University Press. ISBN 978-0-300-08208-1.
- Rajewski, Genevieve (May 2008). "Where Dinosaurs Roamed". Smithsonian. 39 (2): 20–26.
- Schuchert, Charles; LeVene, Clara Mae (1978). O.C. Marsh: Pioneer in Paleontology. Arno Press. ISBN 978-0-405-10733-7.
- Wallace, David (1999). The Bonehunters' Revenge: Dinosaurs, Greed, and the Greatest Scientific Feud of the Gilded Age. Houghton Mifflin. ISBN 978-0-618-08240-7.
- Wilford, John Noble (1985). The Riddle of the Dinosaur. New York: Knopf Publishing. ISBN 0-394-74392-X.
