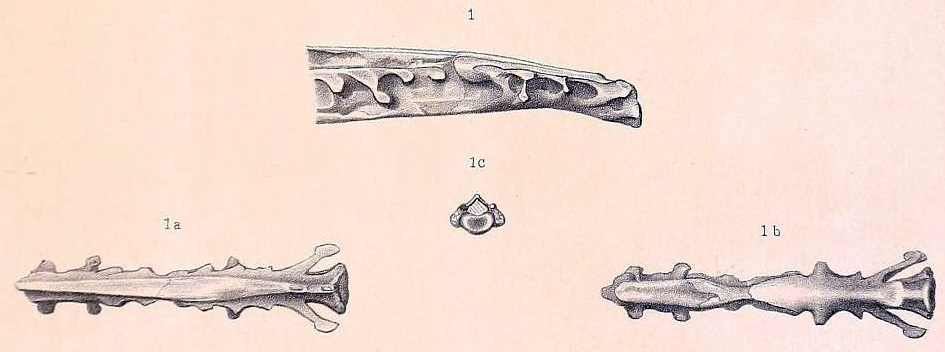
- Holotype of A. celer

Scientific classification
- Kingdom: Animalia
- Phylum: Chordata
- Class: Reptilia
- Clade: Dinosauria
- Clade: Saurischia
- Clade: Theropoda
- Clade: Avialae
- Clade: Ornithurae
- Genus: †Apatornis; Marsh, 1873b
- Species: †A. celer

Binomial name
- †Apatornis celer (Marsh, 1873a)

Synonyms
- Ichthyornis celer Marsh, 1873a

= Apatornis =

Apatornis Temporal range: Late Cretaceous, 83.5 Ma

Extinct genus of dinosaurs

Apatornis is a genus of ornithuran dinosaurs endemic to North America during the late Cretaceous. It currently contains a single species, Apatornis celer, which lived around the Santonian-Campanian boundary, dated to about 83.5 million years ago. The remains of this species were found in the Smoky Hill Chalk of the Niobrara Formation in Kansas, United States. It is known from a single fossil specimen: a synsacrum, the fused series of vertebrae over the hips.

While the known fossil remains are very incomplete, enough has been found to reasonably estimate that the body length was between 7–8 inches (18–20 cm).

The type specimen of A. celer, YPM 1451, was reportedly discovered by Othniel Charles Marsh in October 1872 at Butte Creek in Logan County, Kansas. This location is now recognized as falling between Marker Units 15 and 19 of the Smoky Hill Chalk geological formation. An additional, more complete specimen had also been referred to Apatornis celer by Marsh. This more complete specimen had historically been the one used almost exclusively to form the basis of what was known about Apatornis. However, Julia Clarke noted in 2004 that because the second specimen did not preserve any of the same bones as the first, the two could not be scientifically compared. Clarke therefore reclassified the second specimen as its own genus and species, Iaceornis marshi.

== Classification ==
The traditional genus Apatornis has been defined as a clade, specifically as all species more closely related to the type specimen YPM 1451 than to either Ichthyornis or modern birds.

Apatornis celer was recognized as a distinct species by Marsh (1873). Its type species was originally classified as Ichthyornis celer. A. celer was long allied with Ichthyornis, having been assigned to Ichthyornidae by Marsh (1873), to Odontotormae by Marsh (1880), and to Ichthyornithiformes by Sepkoski (2002). Apatornis differs from Ichthyornis primarily in that it had at least one additional rib attached to the hip vertebrae (sacrum), possibly more as the entire synsacrum was not preserved in the only known specimen. Apatornis also lacked the ossified tendons covering the top of the sacral region in Ichthyornis. In a 2004 paper, Julia Clarke noted that the few unique characteristics preserved in the A. celer specimen, rather than suggesting a close relationship with Ichthyornis as originally thought, actually suggest it is more closely related to modern birds, a hypothesis also supported by Hope in 2002. In 2022, Benito and colleagues noted the variability in the sacral anatomy among known Ichthyornis specimens, and suggested that the validity of Apatornis should be re-evaluated.

Its exact relationships are unresolved, mainly due to the paucity of fossil remains. Though it has sometimes been considered to be closely related to modern waterfowl (Anseriformes), most researchers today consider it to be an early member of the clade Ornithurae.
