= Iaceornis =

Iaceornis Temporal range: Late Cretaceous, 83.5 Ma

Scientific classification
- Kingdom: Animalia
- Phylum: Chordata
- Class: Reptilia
- Clade: Dinosauria
- Clade: Saurischia
- Clade: Theropoda
- Clade: Avialae
- Clade: Ornithuromorpha
- Clade: Ornithurae
- Genus: †Iaceornis; Clarke, 2004
- Species: †I. marshi

Binomial name
- †Iaceornis marshi Clarke, 2004

Extinct genus of dinosaurs

Iaceornis is a genus of marine ornithuran dinosaurs closely related to modern birds. It was endemic to North America during the Late Cretaceous, living about 83.5 million years ago. It is known from a single fossil specimen found in Gove County, Kansas, and consisting of a partial skeleton lacking a skull.

Since it was first discovered by Othniel Charles Marsh in 1877, the specimen (YPM 1734) was long considered to belong to the contemporary species Apatornis celer. Because it is relatively complete, most discussions of Apatornis actually focused on the Iaceornis fossil. In 2004, paleontologist Julia A. Clarke showed that the skeleton actually differed in important characteristics of the wing bones from the true, holotype specimen of Apatornis. Therefore, she assigned the more complete remains to a new genus and species, Iaceornis marshi, meaning "Marsh's neglected bird".

In Clarke's phylogenetic analysis, she found that Iaceornis is more advanced than Ichthyornis but less advanced than modern birds.
