= Bladen Formation =

Geologic formation in North Carolina

- Stratigraphic range: Middle Campanian; ~77.5–76 Ma
- Type: Formation
- Unit of: Black Creek Group
- Underlies: Donoho Creek Formation, Peedee Formation
- Overlies: Tar Heel/Coachman Formation

Lithology
- Primary: Sandstone, siltstone

Location
- Region: North Carolina, South Carolina
- Country: United States

Type section
- Named for: Bladen County, North Carolina

The Bladen Formation is a geologic formation from the Late Cretaceous (middle Campanian) of North Carolina and South Carolina, USA. It is known for a plethora of terrestrial and aquatic vertebrate fossils, including dinosaurs and mosasaurs. It appears to be roughly concurrent with the Tuscaloosa Formation of Alabama.

Unlike many other Cretaceous geologic formations from eastern North America, which were deposited in entirely marine environments, the Bladen Formation appears to have been deposited in a former river delta in an estuarine habitat, allowing for a mixture of freshwater, terrestrial, and marine fauna. An important locality is the former Bladen County landfill annex in Elizabethtown, North Carolina, which contains the richest known fauna from the formation. Another notable locality is near Quinby in Florence County, South Carolina, which also appears to have been deposited in a nonmarine environment with minor marine influence.

It is deposited as a thin layer over the Tar Heel/Coachman Formation, which is often confused with. In North Carolina, it underlies the Maastrichtian-aged Peedee Formation, while in South Carolina it underlies the slightly younger Campanian-aged Donoho Creek Formation.

== Vertebrate paleobiota ==
Based on Crane (2011), Schwimmer et al (2015) and the Paleobiology Database:

=== Cartilaginous fish ===
Based on Crane (2011) and Case et al (2019):

The chondrichthyan biota closely resembles that of the Aguja Formation from Texas.

==== Hybodonts ====
Hybodonts of the Bladen Formation
Genus	Species	Location	Notes	Images
Lonchidion	L. babulskii	Elizabethtown, NC	A lonchidiid.	
Meristodonoides	M. novojerseyensis	Elizabethtown, NC	A hybodontid.	
Meristodonoides	M. sp.	Elizabethtown, NC	A hybodontid.	

==== Sharks ====
Sharks of the Bladen Formation
Genus	Species	Location	Notes	Images
Archaeolamna	A. kopingensis	Elizabethtown, NC	An archaeolamnid mackerel shark.	
Cantioscyllium	C. clementsi	Elizabethtown, NC	A nurse shark. Type locality of this species.	
Cretalamna	C. appendiculata	Elizabethtown, NC	A megatooth shark.	
Cretalamna	C. sp.	Elizabethtown, NC	A megatooth shark.	
Cretorectolobus	C. sp.	Elizabethtown, NC	A wobbegong.	
Galeorhinus	G. sp.	Elizabethtown, NC	A relative of the school shark.	
Plicatoscyllium	P. globidens	Elizabethtown, NC	A nurse shark.	
Protolamna	P. borodini	Elizabethtown, NC	An eoptolamnid mackerel shark.	
Scapanorhynchus	S. texanus	Elizabethtown, NC	A goblin shark.	
Squalicorax	S. kaupi	Elizabethtown, NC	A crow shark.	
Squalicorax	S. cf. S. pristodontus	Elizabethtown, NC	A crow shark.	
Squatina	S. sp.	Elizabethtown, NC	An angelshark. Sometimes assigned to the dubious species S. hassei.	

==== Rays ====
Rays of the Bladen Formation
Genus	Species	Location	Notes	Images
Anoxypristis	A. sp.	Elizabethtown, NC	A sawfish.	
Borodinopristis	B. schwimmeri	Elizabethtown, NC	A sclerorhynchid sawskate. Type locality of B. shannoni.	
Borodinopristis	B. shannoni	Elizabethtown, NC	A sclerorhynchid sawskate. Type locality of B. shannoni.	
Brachyrhizodus	B. wichitaensis	Elizabethtown, NC	An eagle ray.	
Dasyatis	D. cf. commercensis	Elizabethtown, NC	A whiptail stingray.	
Ischyrhiza	I. avonicola	Elizabethtown, NC	A sclerorhynchid sawskate.	
Ischyrhiza	I. mira	Elizabethtown, NC	A sclerorhynchid sawskate.	
Onchopristis	O. sp.	Elizabethtown, NC	An onchopristid sawskate.	
Ptychotrygon	P. triangularis	Elizabethtown, NC	A ptychotrygonid sawskate.	
Ptychotrygon	P. vermiculata	Elizabethtown, NC	A ptychotrygonid sawskate.	
Protoplatyrhina	P. sp.	Elizabethtown, NC	A hypsobatid ray.	
Pseudohypolophus	P. ellipsis	Elizabethtown, NC	A guitarfish.	
Rhinobatos	R. casieri	Elizabethtown, NC	A guitarfish.	
Rhombodus	R. binkhorsti	Elizabethtown, NC	A rhombodontid ray.	
Rhombodus	R. laevis	Elizabethtown, NC	A rhombodontid ray.	
Schizorhiza	S. sp.	Elizabethtown, NC	A schizorhizid sawskate.	

=== Bony fish ===
Bony fish of the Bladen Formation
Genus	Species	Location	Notes	Images
Albula	A. sp.	Elizabethtown, NC	A bonefish.	
Anomoeodus	A. phaseolus	Elizabethtown, NC	A pycnodontid pycnodont.	
Cylindracanthus	C. sp	Elizabethtown, NC	A fish of uncertain affinities.	
Enchodus	E. cf. petrosus	Elizabethtown, NC	An enchodontid aulopiform.	
Hadrodus	H. priscus	Elizabethtown, NC	A hadrodontid fish (considered a pycnodont or a semionotiform)	
Lepisosteus	L. sp.	Elizabethtown, NC	A gar.	
Paralbula	P. casei	Elizabethtown, NC	A phyllodontid elopomorph.	
Protosphyraena	P. sp.	Elizabethtown, NC	A pachycormid.	
Xiphactinus	X. vetus	Elizabethtown, NC	An ichthyodectid ichthyodectiform.	

=== Amphibians ===
Amphibians of the Bladen Formation
Genus	Species	Location	Notes	Images
Albanerpetontidae indet.		Elizabethtown, NC	An albanerpetontid.	

=== Reptiles ===
==== Dinosaurs ====
Based on Brownstein (2018):

Dinosaurs of the Bladen Formation
Genus	Species	Location	Notes	Images
"Coelosaurus" (="Ornithomimus")	"C." sp.	Elizabethtown, NC	An ornithomimosaur.	
Hadrosauridae indet.		Elizabethtown, NC	A hadrosaur.	
Tyrannosauroidea indet.		Elizabethtown, NC	A tyrannosauroid.	

==== Crocodylomorphs ====
Crocodylomorphs of the Bladen Formation
Genus	Species	Location	Notes	Images
Borealosuchus	B. sp.	Elizabethtown, NC Quinby, SC	A eusuchian.	
Deinosuchus	D. rugosus	Elizabethtown, NC Quinby, SC	An alligatoroid, one of the largest known crocodilians.	
Gavialoidea indet.		Quinby, SC	A gavialoid.	

==== Turtles ====
Turtles of the Bladen Formation
Genus	Species	Location	Notes	Images
Bothremys	B. sp.	Elizabethtown, NC	A bothremydid side-necked turtle.	
Chedighaii	C. sp.	Elizabethtown, NC	A bothremydid side-necked turtle.	
Euclastes	E. wielandi	Quinby, SC	A pancheloniid sea turtle.	
"Trionyx"	"T." halophilus	Quinby, SC	A stem-softshell turtle, likely not an actual member of the genus Trionyx. Species names are nomina dubia.	
"Trionyx"	"T." priscus	Quinby, SC	A stem-softshell turtle, likely not an actual member of the genus Trionyx. Species names are nomina dubia.	
"Trionyx"	"T." sp.	Elizabethtown, NC	A stem-softshell turtle, likely not an actual member of the genus Trionyx. Species names are nomina dubia.	

==== Plesiosaurs ====
Plesiosaurs of the Bladen Formation
Genus	Species	Location	Notes	Images
Elasmosauridae indet.		Elizabethtown, NC Quinby, SC	An elasmosaurid.	

==== Squamates ====
Squamates of the Bladen Formation
Genus	Species	Location	Notes	Images
Coniophis	C. sp.	Elizabethtown, NC	An aquatic snake.	
Tylosaurus	T. sp.	Elizabethtown, NC	A tylosaurine mosasaur.	

=== Mammals ===
Mammals of the Bladen Formation
Genus	Species	Location	Notes	Images
Cimolomys	C. sp.	Elizabethtown, NC	A multituberculate.	

== See also ==
- List of dinosaur-bearing rock formations
