= Severn Formation =

Geological Formation in Maryland

- Stratigraphic range: Maastrichtian
- Type: Geological formation

The Severn Formation is a Mesozoic geologic formation in Maryland. Dinosaur remains diagnostic to the genus level are among the fossils that have been recovered from the formation.

== Paleofauna ==
=== Dinosaurs ===
- "Coelosaurus" antiquus
- Ornithomimidae indet.
- Hadrosauridae indet.

=== Plesiosaurs ===
- Cimoliasaurus magnus

=== Mosasaurs ===
- Halisaurus platyspondylus
- Prognathodon rapax
- Mosasaurus hoffmanni
- Mosasaurus sp.
- cf. Mosasaurus conodon
- Mosasauridae indet.

=== Crocodylomorphs ===
- Deinosuchus rugosus
- Thoracosaurus neocesariensis
- Alligatorinae indet.

=== Turtles ===
- Peritresius ornatus
- Osteopygis emarginatus
- Trionyx priscus
- Toxochelyidae indet.

=== Chondrichthyans ===
- Carcharias holmdelensis
- Carcharias samhammeri
- Chiloscyllium greeni
- Cretalamana appendiculata
- Dasyatis sp.
- Tomewingia problematica
- Galeorhinus garadoti
- Ginglymostoma sp.
- Heterodontus sp.
- Hybodus sp.
- Ischyrhiza cf. avonicola
- Ischyrhiza mira
- Myliobatis sp.
- Odontaspis aculeatus
- Plicatoscyllium antiquum
- Plicatoscyllium derameei
- Pseudohypolophus mcnultyi
- Ptychotrygon vermiculata
- Raja farishi
- Rhinobatos sp.
- Rhombodus binkhorsti
- Serratolamna serrata
- Squalicorax kaupi
- Squalicorax pristodontus
- Squatina hassei
- Ischyodus sp.

=== Osteichthyans ===
- Albuidae indet.
- Anomoedus cf. haseolus
- Cylinadracanthus sp.
- Egertonia sp.
- Enchodus ferox
- Hadrodus sp.
- Lepidosteus sp.
- Paralbula casei

== See also ==
- List of dinosaur-bearing rock formations
  - List of stratigraphic units with few dinosaur genera
