= Pinus raritanensis =

Pinus raritanensis Temporal range: 83.6–72.1 Ma Late Cretaceous

Scientific classification
- Kingdom: Plantae
- Clade: Tracheophytes
- Clade: Gymnospermae
- Division: Pinophyta
- Class: Pinopsida
- Order: Pinales
- Family: Pinaceae
- Genus: Pinus
- Species: †P. raritanensis

Binomial name
- †Pinus raritanensis Berry, 1909

Extinct species of plant

Pinus raritanensis was a pine species from the Campanian stage. It was discovered in the Raritan Formation with other remains found in the Black Creek Formation along the American East Coast, particularly in New Jersey, South Carolina and Alabama. It is only known from foliage.

== See also ==
- Pinus susquaensis
