= Ellisdale =

Ellisdale may refer to:

- Ellisdale, New Jersey, United States, an unincorporated community
- Ellisdale Fossil Site, a fossil bed near Ellisdale
