= Cantioscyllium =

Cantioscyllium Temporal range: Barremian–Maastrichtian

Scientific classification
- Kingdom: Animalia
- Phylum: Chordata
- Class: Chondrichthyes
- Subclass: Elasmobranchii
- Division: Selachii
- Order: Orectolobiformes
- Family: Ginglymostomatidae
- Genus: †Cantioscyllium; Woodward 1889

Species
- †Cantioscyllium alhaulfi Kriwet 1999; †Cantioscyllium brachyplicatum Kriwet et al. 2009; †Cantioscyllium decipiens Woodward 1889; †Cantioscyllium meyeri Case and Cappetta 1997

Genus of extinct nurse shark

Cantioscyllium is an extinct genus of nurse shark from the Mesozoic era. It is known mainly from isolated teeth, but was named on a partial skeleton from the Late Cretaceous of England. It is a widespread and diverse genus, currently containing 10 species. They are uncommon but present throughout the late cretaceous of the eastern United States, including the Severn Formation of Maryland, the Tar Heel and Peedee formations of North Carolina, and Campanian of New Jersey. It is also known from the Western Interior Seaway and western Europe. C. hashimiaensis is known from the Santonian of Jordan. C. alhaulfi is from the Barremian.
