= Black Creek Group =

Geological group in North Carolina

- Stratigraphic range: Early-Mid Campanian, 83.5–75 Ma
- Type: Group
- Sub-units: Tar Heel/Coachman Formation, Bladen Formation, Donoho Creek Formation
- Underlies: Peedee Formation
- Overlies: Middendorf Formation

Location
- Coordinates: 34.6°N 78.5°W
- Approximate paleocoordinates: 35.0°N 50.2°W
- Region: North Carolina, South Carolina
- Country: United States

The Black Creek Group is a Late Cretaceous (early to middle Campanian)-aged geologic group in the southeastern United States, which lies in the coastal plains of North Carolina and South Carolina. The oldest formation was deposited in the Early Campanian, around an age of 82.3-73.4 Ma or 74.5-82 (based on strontium isotopes). Deposited in brackish or nearshore marine conditions, it preserves fossils, including a diversity of dinosaurs and marine reptiles.

It consists of the following geologic formations:

- Tar Heel/Coachman Formation (oldest)
- Bladen Formation
- Donoho Creek Formation (youngest)

== Paleofauna ==
Black Creek Group paleofauna consisted primarily of ceratopsians, a unique fauna that existed in North America during the Late Cretaceous.

- cf. Deinosuchus rugosus
- cf. Coelosaurus antiquus
- cf. Dryptosaurus sp.
- cf. Lophorhoton atopus
- Hypsibema crassicauda - "Caudal vertebrae, fragmentary humerus, fragmentary tibia, metatarsal II."
- Leptoceratopsidae indet.
- Dromaeosauridae indet.

== Lithology ==
The Black Creek Group follows a deltaic to shelf sedimentation model, meaning the sediments were distributed across river deltas in the region.In terms of lithologic makeup, the group consists of dark grey sands, clayley sands, silt, and shale.As the oldest formation, the Tar Heel/Coachman lies underneath the Bladen and Donoho Creek formations. However, the Donoho Creek Formation is unevenly distributed overtop of the Tar Heel/Coachman.The Black Creek Group is made up of a sediment core. Research shows that because of this, the Black Creek Group could be a source of microvertebrate fossils that are largely unavailable for research.

== See also ==
- List of dinosaur-bearing rock formations
- List of stratigraphic units with few dinosaur genera
- List of fossiliferous stratigraphic units in North Carolina
