= Donoho Creek Formation =

Geologic formation in South Carolina, United States

- Stratigraphic range: Late Campanian; ~76–75 Ma
- Type: Geological formation
- Unit of: Black Creek Group
- Underlies: Pee Dee Formation
- Overlies: Bladen Formation

Location
- Region: South Carolina
- Country: United States

The Donoho Creek Formation is a Mesozoic geologic formation in South Carolina. Dinosaur remains are among the fossils that have been recovered from the formation.

Dinosaurs known from the formation:

- Appalachiosaurus montgomeriensis
- Saurornitholestes langstoni
- Hadrosauridae indet.
- Ornithomimosauria indet.

== See also ==
- List of dinosaur-bearing rock formations
  - List of stratigraphic units with indeterminate dinosaur fossils
