= Ellisdale Fossil Site =

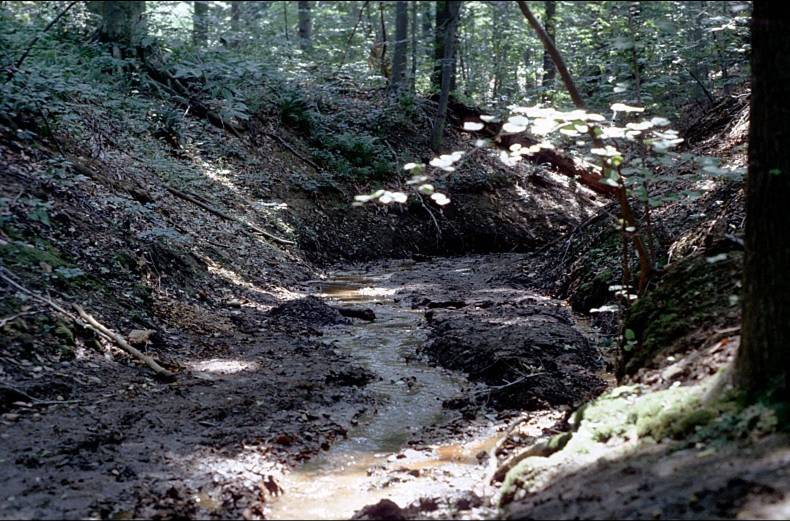

- Approximate location of the dig site.
- 40°9′19.969″N 74°38′47.249″W
- Type: Fossil bed
- Periods: Appalachia (Mesozoic)
- Location: near Ellisdale, New Jersey
- Region: the border of Monmouth and Burlington Counties
- Part of: Marshalltown Formation

Site notes
- Owner: Monmouth County Park System
- Management: New Jersey State Museum
- Public access: Restricted - Private ownership (land)

The Ellisdale Fossil Site is located near Ellisdale in the valley of the Crosswicks Creek, in Monmouth County, New Jersey, United States. The site has produced the largest and most diverse fauna of Late Cretaceous terrestrial animals from eastern North America, including the type specimens of the teiid lizard Prototeius stageri and the batrachosauroidid salamander Parrisia neocesariensis. The site occurs within the basal portion of the Marshalltown Formation, and dates from the Campanian Stage of the Late Cretaceous. The site is classified as a Konzentrat-Lagerstätten resulting from a prehistoric coastal storm.

== History of the discovery ==
The Ellisdale site was discovered in 1980 by two avocational paleontologists, Robert K. Denton Jr. and Robert C. O'Neill, who brought it to the attention of David C. Parris, the Director of the Bureau of Natural History at the New Jersey State Museum. Parris encouraged the two collectors to continue monitoring the site, and within a few years hundreds of disarticulated bones of dinosaurs, crocodilians, turtles and fish had been donated to the New Jersey State Museum, which is the repository for the collection. The significance of the Ellisdale Site was recognized by the National Geographic Society which sponsored research under Society grants in 1986 and 1987. To date over 20,000 specimens have been collected. The Ellisdale Site is currently owned by Monmouth County Park System and is under the management of the New Jersey State Museum. Fossil collecting by the general public is prohibited.

== Geological setting ==
The Ellisdale site occurs within the basal portion of the Marshalltown Formation, of the Late Cretaceous Matawan Group of New Jersey. The exposures of the Marshalltown Formation at Ellisdale have basal lenticular bedded estuarine clays underlain by crossbedded coastal sands of the Englishtown Formation. The estuarine clays are overlain by well-sorted, crossbedded sand and offshore glauconites, respectively. The entire sequence is interpreted as preserving the landward migration of a barrier beach/backbay/estuarine/deltaic complex during the Marshalltown transgression. Vertebrate fossils are concentrated with rip-up clasts near the base of the estuarine clay sequence in a lag deposit consisting of siderite pebbles, poorly graded sand, and lignite. The fossil layer is considered a single-event storm deposit based on sedimentology and stratigraphy. The upper (marine) member of the Marshalltown was formerly considered latest Campanian in age, due to the presence of the foraminifer Globotruncana calcarata; however the G. calcarata zone has since been redated as Middle Campanian in age (75-76 Ma).

== Paleoecology and taphonomy ==
Remains of animals from at least four paleoenvironments are represented at the Ellisdale Site: marine, lagoonal/backbay, estuarine/freshwater, and terrestrial. The ecosystem was likely reminiscent of the modern Albemarle Sound in North Carolina. Mixed faunal assemblages of this type are typically associated with transgressive lag deposits, and result from the slow accumulation of transported skeletal remains in tidal channels, backbays, and lagoons. Wave action and storms relocated the bones of marine animals to shallow water, while river currents and flooding events transported and deposited the remains of freshwater and upland terrestrial animals such as crocodilians and dinosaurs.

Megafossils of at least three different types of plants have been found at the site: Liriodendron, Metasequoia, and Picea. In addition, possible remains of Mangrove roots have been found encased in siderite concretions. Amber has been found at the site occurring in small droplets, generally less than 5 millimeters in size. Taphonomic analysis of the Ellisdale fauna has revealed two distinctly different types of preservation. Bones of both marine and upland terrestrial animals are typically broken, heavily worn, and missing the outermost layer of compact bone (periosteum). In contrast, the bones of microvertebrates such as amphibians, lizards and mammals are much more complete, with delicate processes and the periosteum intact.

The small animal fauna of the site probably represents a "proximal" assemblage that lived at or near the final point of deposition, while the heavily worn bones represent a "distal" fauna. It is thought that the proximal fauna may have lived within a freshwater deltaic estuary that was affected by a coastal storm surge or a possible tsunami. The presence of numerous well-preserved amphibian fossils support the idea that the environment was freshwater, as amphibians are salt-intolerant. The disarticulated bones which accumulated in the lagoonal backbays by river transport, and in the shallow marine environment offshore, would have been mixed with the skeletal remains of the animals that lived within the delta as the storm surge swept over the estuary. Return flooding from the overfilled lagoons and estuarine channels after the storm's passage would have subsequently filled with debris, resulting in the mixed assemblage of animal and plant remains that are found at the site today.

== Faunal list ==
=== Chondrichthyes ===
==== Selachimorpha ====
- Hybodus sp.
- Lonchidion sp.
- cf. Paranomotodon angustidens
- Pseudocorax granti
- Squalicorax kaupi
- Cretalamna appendiculata lata
- Cretodus arcuata
- Protolamna borodini
- Scapanorhynchus texanus
- Carcharias samhammeri
- Eostriatolamia holmdelensis
- Squatina hassei

==== Batoidea ====
- Ischyrhiza mira
- cf. Sclerorhynchus sp.
- Ptychotrygon vermiculata
- Ptychotrygon hooveri
- Borodinopristis sp.
- Rhombodus levis
- Brachyrhizodus wichitaensis
- Pseudohypolophus sp.
- Protoplatyrhina sp.

==== Chimaeriformes ====
- Ischyodus bifurcatus

=== Osteichthyes ===
- Acipenser sp.
- Amia cf. fragosa
- Atractosteus occidentalis
- Anomoeodus sp.
- Pycnodontidae indet.
- Paralbula casei
- Albula sp.
- Xiphactinus vetus
- Enchodus petrosus
- cf. Platacodon sp.
- cf. Cimolichthys sp.

=== Amphibia ===
==== Caudata ====
- Parrisia neocesariensis
- Sirenidae indet.
- cf. Habrosaurus sp.

==== Anura ====
- Hylidae indet.
- cf. Eopelobates sp.
- cf. Discoglossus sp.

=== Reptilia ===
==== Chelonii ====
- Adocus beatus
- Apalone sp.
- Bothremys barberi
- Corsochelys sp.
- Chelydroidea indet.

==== Lacertilia ====
- Prototeius stageri
- cf. Haptosphenus sp.
- Iguanidae indet.
- Xenosauridae indet.
- Helodermatidae indet.
- Anguinae indet.
- Necrosauridae indet.
- cf. Halisaurus sp.

==== Crocodilia ====
- Borealosuchus threensis
- cf. Brachychampsa sp.
- Deinosuchus rugosus.
- Atoposauridae indet.

=== Dinosauria ===
==== Saurischia ====
- Dryptosaurus sp.
- Appalachiosaurus sp.
- cf. Dromaeosauridae indet.
- Tyrannosauroidea indet.

==== Ornithischia ====
- Hadrosauridae indet.
- Hypsibema crassicauda

=== Mammalia ===
==== Multituberculata ====
- Cimolomyidae indet.
- cf. Cimolodon sp.
- Cimolodontidae indet.

==== Metatheria ====
- Stagodontidae indet.

==== Eutheria ====
- cf. Eutheria indet.

== Significance ==
During Late Cretaceous times, the North American Continent was divided by an inland sea into two subcontinents: a western continent now known as "Laramidia", and an eastern continent named "Appalachia". Although a rich and diverse assemblage of taxa has been found from Laramidia, little is known of the contemporaneous terrestrial fauna of the Appalachian subcontinent. The Ellisdale Site has provided the first detailed look at the terrestrial fauna of Appalachia, including the rare fossil remains of frogs, salamanders, lizards and mammals.

It has been suggested that land animals may have migrated between Laramidia and Appalachia, and possibly even the European Archipelago, throughout the Late Cretaceous; however the presence of an endemic "Ellisdalean" land fauna does not support this hypothesis. The Ellisdale fauna together with geological data suggest that eastern North America was an isolated continent from the Turonian Stage of the Late Cretaceous onward, and thus may have become a refugium for relatively underived Early Cretaceous taxa that underwent vicariant speciation. If dispersal to the European archipelago did take place via a North Atlantic route, it could not have happened until near the close of the Cretaceous Period, based on paleogeographic and paleontologic studies.
