= Egertonia =

Egertonia Temporal range: Maastrichtian to Middle Eocene

Scientific classification
- Domain: Eukaryota
- Kingdom: Animalia
- Phylum: Chordata
- Class: Actinopterygii
- Order: Albuliformes
- Family: †Phyllodontidae
- Subfamily: †Phyllodontinae
- Genus: †Egertonia; Cocchi, 1866
- Species: †E. isodonta

Binomial name
- †Egertonia isodonta Cocchi, 1866

Extinct genus of fishes

Egertonia (named after paleontologist Sir Philip Grey Egerton, 10th Baronet) is an extinct genus of prehistoric marine and estuarine ray-finned fish known from the Late Cretaceous to the middle Eocene. It contains one known species, E. isodonta, although indeterminate remains potentially referable to other species are also known. It was a member of the Phyllodontidae, an extinct family of elopomorph fish with crushing tooth plates, which are the primary remains found of the genus.

Excluding dubious records from the Campanian (Tar Heel Formation) and Maastrichtian (Severn Formation) of eastern North America, the earliest confirmed occurrences of the genus in the fossil record are from the Maastrichtian of Madagascar (Maevarano Formation) and Tamil Nadu, India (Kallamedu Formation). These formations are suggestive of a fluvial-estuarine environment with frequent marine intrusions. Notably, despite Egertonia expanding its range to the Northern Hemisphere during the Cenozoic, both of these early localities are Gondwanan in origin. These fossil tooth plates are reminiscent of E. isodonta.

As with several other members of its family, Egertonia survived the Cretaceous-Paleogene extinction event and it became more widespread during the Cenozoic, when the type species E. isodonta appears. The earliest remains of E. isodonta are from the Late Paleocene of South Carolina. It becomes much more common during the Eocene, when remains are known from the Ypresian to Bartonian of the eastern United States (Gosport Sand and Tallahatta Formations of Alabama, Tuscahoma Formation of Mississippi, Nanjemoy Formation of Virginia), Ypresian of England (London Clay), and the Lutetian of Barbados (Scotland Formation). Indeterminate Egertonia fossils are known from the Lutetian of England (Selsey Formation), Ypresian of Belgium (Argile des Flandres Formation), and the Ypresian of India (Cambay Shale Formation). It went extinct at some point during the mid-late Eocene.

== See also ==
- Prehistoric fish
- List of prehistoric bony fish
