= Parrisia =

Parrisia Temporal range: Late Cretaceous, 84.9–70.6 Ma

Scientific classification
- Kingdom: Animalia
- Phylum: Chordata
- Class: Amphibia
- Family: †Batrachosauroididae
- Genus: †Parrisia; Denton and O'Neill, 1998

Type species
- Parrisia neocesariensis Denton and O'Neill, 1998

Extinct genus of salamanders

Parrisia is an extinct genus of batrachosauroidid salamander from Campanian-age rocks in the Marshalltown Formation, Monmouth County, New Jersey. The type and only species is Parrisia neocesariensis, which was discovered at the Ellisdale Fossil Site in New Jersey.
