= Peedee Formation =

Geological formation in the United States

- Stratigraphic range: Early to Late Maastrichtian, 71.0–66.9 Ma
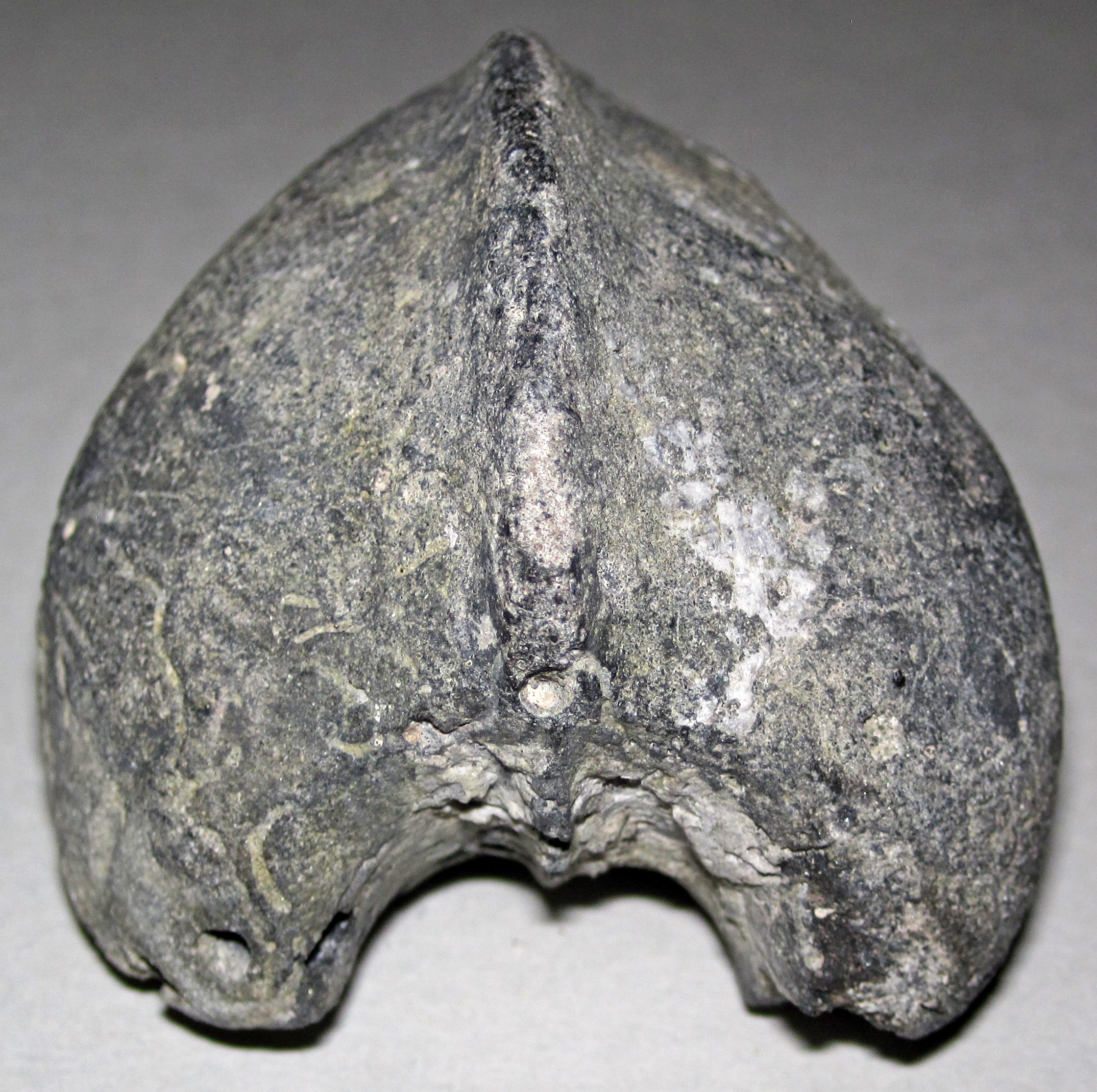
- Cucullaea, a fossil bivalve from the Peedee Formation (South Carolina)
- Type: Formation
- Sub-units: Rocky Point Member, Island Creek Member
- Underlies: Castle Hayne Limestone
- Overlies: Black Creek Group
- Thickness: Up to 886 ft (270 m)

Lithology
- Primary: Glauconitic to argillic sandstone
- Other: Claystone, limestone

Location
- Region: North Carolina, South Carolina
- Country: United States

Type section
- Named for: Pee Dee River, type locality: Burches Ferry, South Carolina

The Peedee Formation is a geologic formation in North and South Carolina. A marine deposit representing an inner neritic environment, named for exposures along the Great Peedee River, it preserves invertebrate (primarily belemnites, echinoderms and foraminifera) and vertebrate (primarily shark teeth, with some marine reptile remains) fossils dating to the Late Cretaceous (Maastrichtian).

The formation is notable for its occurrence of Belemnitella americana, known as the Pee Dee Belemnite (PDB), a long-standing standard in stable carbon isotope research. A single pterosaur femur, possibly an Azhdarchid, from the Peedee formation is one of the few pterosaur body fossils found in Eastern North America.

The stratigraphy of the formation spans from the early Maastrichtian (in South Carolina) to the late Maastrichtian shortly before the Cretaceous-Paleogene extinction event. The formation is divided into several members, including the early-mid Maastrichtian Rocky Point Member and the late Maastrichtian Island Creek Member. Based on its fauna, it appears to be roughly concurrent with the Navesink Formation from New Jersey.

== Vertebrate paleobiota ==
=== Cartilaginous fish ===
Based on Case et al. (2017):

==== Sharks ====
Genus	Species	Location	Member	Notes	Images
Anomotodon	A. cf. toddi	Martin-Marietta Castle Hayne Quarry, North Carolina	Island Creek	A goblin shark.	
Archaeolamna	A. kopingensis	Duplin County, North Carolina		An archaeolamnid mackerel shark.	
Cantioscyllium	C. cf. meyeri	Martin-Marietta Castle Hayne Quarry, North Carolina	Island Creek	A nurse shark.	
Carcharias	C. cf. samhammeri	Martin-Marietta Castle Hayne Quarry, North Carolina	Island Creek	A sand shark, related to the modern sand tiger shark.	
Cretalamna	C. maroccana	Martin-Marietta Castle Hayne Quarry, North Carolina	Island Creek	A megatooth shark.	
Heterodontus	H. granti	Martin-Marietta Castle Hayne Quarry, North Carolina	Island Creek	A bullhead shark.	
"Hybodus"	"H." sp.	Duplin County, North Carolina		A hybodont shark.	
Notidanodon	N. sp.	Martin-Marietta Castle Hayne Quarry, North Carolina	Island Creek	A cow shark. Teeth damaged but resemble those of the widespread species N. dentatus.	
Odontaspis	O. aculeatus	Martin-Marietta Castle Hayne Quarry, North Carolina	Island Creek	A sand shark.	
Palaeogaleus	P. sp.	Martin-Marietta Castle Hayne Quarry, North Carolina	Island Creek	A houndshark.	
Plicatoscyllium	P. antiquum	Martin-Marietta Castle Hayne Quarry, North Carolina		A nurse shark.	
Plicatoscyllium	P. derameei	Martin-Marietta Castle Hayne Quarry, North Carolina		A nurse shark.	
Pseudocorax	P. cf. affinis	Martin-Marietta Castle Hayne Quarry, North Carolina	Island Creek	A pseudocoracid mackerel shark.	
Scapanorhynchus	S. texanus	Duplin County, North Carolina		A goblin shark.	
Serratolamna	S. serrata	Martin-Marietta Castle Hayne Quarry, North Carolina	Island Creek	A serratolamnid mackerel shark.	
Squalicorax	S. kaupi	Martin-Marietta Castle Hayne Quarry, North Carolina	Island Creek	A crow shark.	
Squalicorax	S. pristodontus	Martin-Marietta Castle Hayne Quarry, North Carolina	Island Creek	A crow shark.	
Squalus	S. huntensis	Martin-Marietta Castle Hayne Quarry, North Carolina	Island Creek	A spurdog.	

==== Rays ====
Genus	Species	Location	Member	Notes	Images
Dasyatis	D. commercensis	Martin-Marietta Castle Hayne Quarry, North Carolina	Island Creek	A whiptail stingray.	
Ischyrhiza	I. avonicola	Martin-Marietta Castle Hayne Quarry, North Carolina	Island Creek	A sawskate.	
Ischyrhiza	I. mira	Martin-Marietta Castle Hayne Quarry, North Carolina	Island Creek	A sawskate.	
Ptychotrygon	P. clementsi	Martin-Marietta Castle Hayne Quarry, North Carolina	Island Creek	A ptychotrygonid sawskate.	
Raja	R. farishi	Martin-Marietta Castle Hayne Quarry, North Carolina	Island Creek	A skate.	
Rhinobatos	R. sp.	Martin-Marietta Castle Hayne Quarry, North Carolina	Island Creek	A guitarfish, tentatively placed in Rhinobatos.	
Rhombodus	R. binkhorsti	Martin-Marietta Castle Hayne Quarry, North Carolina	Island Creek	A rhombodontid stingray.	
Sclerorhynchus	S. cf. pettersi	Martin-Marietta Castle Hayne Quarry, North Carolina	Island Creek	A ganopristid sawskate.	

=== Bony fish ===
Genus	Species	Location	Member	Notes	Images
Enchodus	E. sp.	East Coast Limestone Quarry, North Carolina	Rocky Point	An enchodontid aulopiform.	

=== Reptiles ===
==== Pterosaurs ====
Genus	Species	Location	Member	Notes	Images
cf. Azhdarchidae indet.		East Coast Limestone Quarry	Rocky Point	A potential azhdarchid, known from a femur closely resembling that of Azhdarcho.	

==== Crocodilians ====
Genus	Species	Location	Notes	Images
Borealosuchus	B. sp.	Diamondhead Loop Road, South Carolina	A eusuchian.	

==== Turtles ====
Genus	Species	Location	Member	Notes	Images
Peritresius	P. ornatus	East Coast Limestone Quarry, North Carolina Allison Ferry, South Carolina	Rocky Point	A pancheloniid sea turtle.	
"Trionyx"	"T." halophilus	Lynchburg, South Carolina		A stem-trionychian.	

==== Plesiosaurs ====
Genus	Species	Location	Member	Notes	Images
Cimoliasaurus	C. magnus	East Coast Limestone Quarry, North Carolina	Rocky Point	An elasmosaurid.	

==== Mosasaurs ====
Genus	Species	Location	Notes	Images
Halisaurus	H. sp.	Holden Beach, North Carolina	A halisaurine.	
Mosasaurus	M. cf. beaugei	Holden Beach, North Carolina	A mosasaurine.	
Mosasaurus	M. cf. hoffmannii	Holden Beach, North Carolina	A mosasaurine.	
Prognathodon	P. cf. solvayi	Holden Beach, North Carolina ?Myrtle Beach, South Carolina	A mosasaurine.	
Prognathodontini indet.		Holden Beach, North Carolina	An indeterminate mosasaurine with large teeth, reminiscent of Thalassotitan.	
Tylosaurus	T. sp.	Diamondhead Loop Road, South Carolina	A tylosaurine.	

== Invertebrate paleobiota ==
=== Echinoderms ===
==== Echinoids ====
Genus	Species	Location	Member	Notes	Images
Cardiaster	C. leonensis	East Coast Limestone Quarry, North Carolina	Rocky Point	A holasterid.	
Catopygus	C. mississippiensis	East Coast Limestone Quarry, North Carolina	Rocky Point	A cassidulid.	
Hardouinia	H. aequoria	Wadsworth Marl Pit, North Carolina Niels Eddy Landing, North Carolina East Coast Limestone Quarry, North Carolina Myrtle Beach, South Carolina	Rocky Point	A cassiduloid.	
Hardouinia	H. kellumi	Wadsworth Marl Pit, North Carolina Niels Eddy Landing, North Carolina East Coast Limestone Quarry, North Carolina Myrtle Beach, South Carolina	Rocky Point	A cassiduloid.	
Hardouinia	H. mortonia	Wadsworth Marl Pit, North Carolina Niels Eddy Landing, North Carolina East Coast Limestone Quarry, North Carolina Myrtle Beach, South Carolina	Rocky Point	A cassiduloid.	
Faujasia	F. chelonium	East Coast Limestone Quarry, North Carolina	Rocky Point	A sand dollar.	
Lefortia	L. trojana	East Coast Limestone Quarry, North Carolina	Rocky Point	A sand dollar.	
Linthia	L. variabilis	East Coast Limestone Quarry, North Carolina	Rocky Point	A schizasterid heart urchin.	
Porosoma	P. sp.	East Coast Limestone Quarry, North Carolina	Rocky Point	A phymosomatid.	

==== Sea stars ====
Genus	Species	Location	Member	Notes	Images
Aldebarania	A. arenitea	Martin-Marietta Castle Hayne Quarry, North Carolina	Rocky Point	An astropectinid.	

==== Crinoids ====
The Peedee Formation preserves some of the latest-occurring remains of the Roveacrinida, an extinct order of minute, pelagic crinoids.

Genus	Species	Location	Member	Notes	Images
Applinocrinus	A. texanus	Wilmington, North Carolina		An applinocrinine saccocomid.	
Birgelocrinus	B. degraafi	Wilmington, North Carolina		An hessicrinine saccocomid.	
Lucernacrinus	B. degraafi	Wilmington, North Carolina		An hessicrinine saccocomid.	
Lucernacrinus	B. jagti	Wilmington, North Carolina		An hessicrinine saccocomid.	
Peedeecrinus	P. sadorfi	Wilmington, North Carolina		An applinocrinine saccocomid.	

=== Molluscs ===
==== Cephalopods ====
Genus	Species	Location	Member	Notes	Images
Belemnitella	B. americana	East Coast Limestone Quarry, North Carolina Black Rock Landing, North Carolina	Rocky Point	A belemnite, source of the famous "Pee Dee Belemnite".	
Sphenodiscus	S. lobatus	East Coast Limestone Quarry, North Carolina	Rocky Point	A sphenodiscid ammonite.	

== See also ==
- List of fossiliferous stratigraphic units in South Carolina
- List of fossiliferous stratigraphic units in North Carolina
