= Tar Heel/Coachman Formation =

Geologic formation in the United States

- Stratigraphic range: Early-Middle Campanian; ~83.2–77.5 Ma
- Type: Formation
- Unit of: Black Creek Group
- Underlies: Bladen Formation
- Overlies: Middendorf Formation

Lithology
- Primary: Siltstone, sandstone

Location
- Coordinates: 34.6°N 78.5°W
- Approximate paleocoordinates: 35.0°N 50.2°W
- Region: North Carolina, South Carolina
- Country: United States

Type section
- Named for: Tar Heel, North Carolina

The Tar Heel Formation, also known as the Coachman Formation in South Carolina, is a Late Cretaceous (early to middle Campanian-aged) geologic formation in North Carolina and South Carolina, United States. It preserves fossils, including amber dating back to the Cretaceous period. A locality known as Phoebus Landing, has been dated to 78.5-77.1 Ma, and the formation has been overall dated to the early Campanian based on fossil pollen.

Likely deposited in a nearshore coastal environment representing a lower shoreface, it contains a high diversity of vertebrate remains. It has one of the most diverse dinosaur faunas known from the former landmass of Appalachia, the majority of which are known from two sites: Phoebus Landing along the Cape Fear River in Bladen County, North Carolina, as well as Stokes Quarry in Darlington County, South Carolina.

Fossil pollen grains suggest a subtropical to warm, moist temperate climate for the region, with an ecosystem largely dominated by flowering plants. The Tar Heel/Coachman Formation appears to be roughly concurrent with the Marshalltown Formation of New Jersey, which preserves a similar fauna.

== Paleobiota ==
=== Cartilaginous fish ===
Based on the Paleobiology Database & Robb (1989):

Cartilaginous fish of the Tar Heel/Coachman Formation
| Genus | Species | Location | Notes | Images |
|---|---|---|---|---|
| "Asteracanthus" | A. sp. | Phoebus Landing, NC | A hybodontid shark. | |
| Brachyrhizodus | B. wichitaensis | Phoebus Landing, NC | An eagle ray. | |
| Carcharias | C. holmdelensis | Phoebus Landing, NC | A sand shark. | |
| Carcharias | C. samhammeri | Phoebus Landing, NC | A sand shark. | |
| "Hypolophus" | H. sp. | Phoebus Landing, NC | A whiptail stingray. | |
| Meristodonoides | M. montanensis | Phoebus Landing, NC | A hybodontid shark. | |
| Rhombodus | R. laevis | Phoebus Landing, NC | A rhombodontid ray. | |
| Ischyrhiza | I. mira | Phoebus Landing, NC | A sawskate. | |
| Ischyodus | I. cf. bifurcatus | Phoebus Landing, NC | A callorhinchid chimaera. | |
| Scapanorhynchus | S. texanus | Phoebus Landing, NC | A goblin shark. | |
| Squalicorax | S. kaupi | Phoebus Landing, NC Stokes Quarry, SC | An anacorid shark. Includes a coprolite potentially assignable to S. kaupi, containing the vertebrae of a baby turtle. | |
| Squalicorax | S. pristodontus | Phoebus Landing, NC Stokes Quarry, SC | An anacorid shark. Includes a coprolite potentially assignable to S. kaupi, containing the vertebrae of a baby turtle. | |
| Squatina | S. hassei | Phoebus Landing, NC | An angelshark. | |

=== Ray-finned fish ===
Based on the Paleobiology Database, Robb (1989) & Stringer et al (2018). Some species are known only from otolith remains from Blue Banks & Auger Hole Landings, North Carolina, which are indicated:

| Genus | Species | Location | Material | Notes | Images |
|---|---|---|---|---|---|
| Albula | ?A. campaniana | Blue Banks & Auger Hole Landings, NC | 263-378 otoliths | A bonefish. | |
| Albula | ?A. cf. A. ripleyensis | Blue Banks Landing, NC | 1 otolith | A bonefish. | |
| Albula | A. sp. | Phoebus Landing, NC | | A bonefish. | |
| Anomoeodus | A. phaseolus | Phoebus Landing, NC | | A pycnodontid pycnodont. | |
| Ariidae indet. | | Blue Banks Landing, NC | 11 otoliths | A sea catfish of uncertain affinities. | |
| Aulopidae indet. | | Blue Banks Landing, NC | 1 otolith | A flagfin of uncertain affinities. | |
| Beryx | ?B. maastrichtiensis | Blue Banks & Auger Hole Landings, NC | 55 otoliths | A potential relative of alfonsinos. | |
| Beryx | ?B. zideki | Blue Banks & Auger Hole Landings, NC | 41 otoliths | A potential relative of alfonsinos. | |
| ?Congridae indet. | | Auger Hole Landing, NC | 1 otolith | An apparent conger eel of uncertain affinities. | |
| Cylindracanthus | C. ornatus | Phoebus Landing, NC | | A fish of uncertain affinities. | |
| Enchodus | E. cf. petrosus | Phoebus Landing, NC | | An enchodontid aulopiform. | |
| Gonostomatidae indet. | | Blue Banks & Auger Hole Landings, NC | 4 otoliths | A bristlemouth of uncertain affinities. | |
| Hoplostethus | ?H. coffeesandensis | Blue Banks & Auger Hole Landings, NC | 4 otoliths | A slimehead. | |
| Kokenichthys | K. ensis | Blue Banks Landing, NC | 2 otoliths | An elopiform or osteoglossiform. | |
| Lepisosteidae indet. | | Phoebus Landing, NC | | A gar. | |
| Megalopidae indet. | | Blue Banks Landing, NC | 1 otolith | A tarpon of uncertain affinities. | |
| Osmeroides | O. weileri | Blue Banks Landing, NC | 6 otoliths | An osmeroidid elopomorph. | |
| Paralbula | P. casei | Phoebus Landing, NC | | A phyllodontid elopomorph. | |
| ?Pempheris | ?P. huddlestoni | Auger Hole Landing, NC | 1 otolith | An apparent sweeper. | |
| Percoidei indet. | | Blue Banks & Auger Hole Landings, NC | 5 otoliths | A percoid. | |
| ?Polymixia | ?P. cf. harderi | Blue Banks Landing, NC | | An apparent beardfish. | |
| Pterothrissus | P. carolinensis | Blue Banks Landing, NC | 67 otoliths | A pterothrissine bonefish. | |
| Saurodon | S. sp. | Phoebus Landing, NC | | A saurodontid ichthyodectiform. | |
| Stephanodus | S. sp. | Phoebus Landing, NC | | A pycnodont. | |
| Xiphactinus | X. audax | Phoebus Landing, North Carolina, NC | | An ichthyodectid ichthyodectiform. | |
| Xiphactinus | X. vetus | Phoebus Landing, North Carolina, NC | | An ichthyodectid ichthyodectiform. | |

=== Reptiles ===
Records from SC based on Schwimmer et al (2015):

==== Dinosaurs ====
===== Ornithischians =====
Based mainly on Brownstein (2018):

Ornithischians of the Tar Heel/Coachman Formation
| Genus | Species | Location | Notes | Images |
|---|---|---|---|---|
| cf. Hadrosaurus | ?H. foulkii | Phoebus Landing & Sampson County, NC | A hadrosaurid, tentatively assigned to the well-known H. foulkii. | |
| "Hadrosaurus" | "H." minor | Phoebus Landing, NC | A small or juvenile hadrosaur, nomen dubium. | |
| Hypsibema | H. crassicauda | Phoebus Landing & Sampson County, NC | A gigantic hadrosauroid. First discovered in North Carolina from Sampson County, 1869, and described by Edward Drinker Cope. It was measured to be 12-17 meters, making it one of the largest hadrosauroids. Type locality for genus and species. | |
| Leptoceratopsidae indet. | | Sampson County, NC | A leptoceratopsid ceratopsian. Known from an indeterminate left maxilla found in 2016. | |
| Lophorhothon | L. atopus | Phoebus Landing, NC | A hadrosauromorph. Originally described from the Mooreville Chalk Formation, Alabama. | |

An indeterminate hadrosauroid is known from Stokes Quarry, SC.

===== Theropods =====
Theropods of the Tar Heel/Coachman Formation
| Genus | Species | Location | Notes | Images |
|---|---|---|---|---|
| Appalachiosaurus | A. montgomeriensis | Stokes Quarry, SC | A large eutyrannosaur. | |
| cf. Coelosaurus (="Ornithomimus") | C. sp. | Phoebus Landing, NC | An intermediate ornithomimosaur. | |
| Dromaeosauridae indet. | | Sampson County, NC | A large dromaeosaurid, larger than Saurornitholestes but smaller than Dakotaraptor. | |
| Dryptosaurus | D. sp. | Phoebus Landing, NC | A large dryptosaurid eutyrannosaur. Originally known from the Maastrichtian of New Jersey, but similar remains referable to this species have been recovered from the Tar Heel. However, most of the attributed specimens are considered as indeterminate Eutyrannosauria separate from this genus, with only a partial femur fragment tentatively classified as D. sp. | |
| Saurornitholestes | S. langstoni | Burches Ferry & Stokes Quarry, SC | A widespread dromaeosaurid ("raptor"). Specimens from this formation provided the first evidence of this species from Appalachia. | |

Indeterminate theropods, ornithomimosaurs, and maniraptorans are known from Stokes Quarry.

==== Crocodylomorphs ====
Based on the Paleobiology Database:

| Genus | Species | Location | Notes | Images |
|---|---|---|---|---|
| Borealosuchus | B. formidabilis | Phoebus Landing, NC | A eusuchian. | |
| Bottosaurus | B. sp. | Stokes Quarry, SC | An early caiman. | |
| Deinosuchus | D. rugosus (=Thecachampsa rugosa, Polydectes biturgidus, Polyptychodon rugosus) | Phoebus Landing & Clifton Farm, NC Stokes Quarry, SC | An alligatoroid, one of the largest known crocodilians. Type locality for genus and species. | |
| Gavialoidea indet. | | Stokes Quarry, SC | A gavialoid. | |

==== Turtles ====
Based on the Paleobiology Database:

| Genus | Species | Location | Notes | Images |
|---|---|---|---|---|
| Adocus | A. beatus | Phoebus Landing, NC Stokes Quarry, SC | An adocid. | |
| Bothremys | B. cooki | Phoebus Landing, NC | A bothremydid side-necked turtle. | |
| Chedighaii | C. barberi | Phoebus Landing, NC | A bothremydid side-necked turtle. | |
| Chedighaii | C. hutchinsoni | Phoebus Landing, NC | A bothremydid side-necked turtle. | |
| Corsochelys | C. bentlyi | Stokes Quarry, SC | A sea turtle, likely a dermochelyid. Type locality for species. | |
| Euclastes | E. wielandi | Stokes Quarry, SC | A pancheloniid sea turtle. | |
| Osteopygis | O. emarginatus | Phoebus Landing, NC | A macrobaenid. | |
| ?Taphrosphys | ?T. dares | Phoebus Landing, NC | A bothremydid side-necked turtle, taxonomic placement disputed. | |
| Toxochelys | T. sp. | Stokes Quarry, SC | A toxochelyid sea turtle. | |
| "Trionyx" | "T." halophilus | Phoebus Landing, NC | A stem-softshell turtle, likely not an actual member of the genus Trionyx. Species names are nomina dubia. | |
| "Trionyx" | "T." priscus | Stokes Quarry, SC | A stem-softshell turtle, likely not an actual member of the genus Trionyx. Species names are nomina dubia. | |

==== Plesiosaurs ====
| Genus | Species | Location | Notes | Images |
|---|---|---|---|---|
| Elasmosauridae indet. | | Stokes Quarry, South Carolina | An elasmosaurid. | |

==== Squamates ====
| Genus | Species | Location | Notes | Images |
|---|---|---|---|---|
| Halisaurus | H. sp. | Phoebus Landing, NC | A halisaurine mosasaur. | |
| Platecarpus | P. sp. | Phoebus Landing, NC | A plioplatecarpine mosasaur. | |
| Prognathodon | P. sp. | Phoebus Landing, NC | A mosasaurine mosasaur. | |
| Teiidae indet. | | Stokes Quarry, SC | A teiid lizard. | |
| Tylosaurus | T. sp. | Phoebus Landing, NC Stokes Quarry, SC | A tylosaurine mosasaur. | |

=== Mammals ===
Based on the Paleobiology Database:

| Genus | Species | Location | Notes | Images |
|---|---|---|---|---|
| Marsupialia indet. | | Darlington County, SC | A presumed marsupial relative. | |
| Multituberculata indet. | | Darlington County, SC | A multituberculate. | |
