= Tomewingia =

Tomewingia Temporal range: Maastrichtian

Scientific classification
- Domain: Eukaryota
- Kingdom: Animalia
- Phylum: Chordata
- Class: Chondrichthyes
- Subclass: Elasmobranchii
- Order: Rajiformes
- Genus: †Tomewingia; Case & Cappetta, 2013

Extinct genus of ray

Tomewingia is an extinct genus of rajiform ray from the Maastrichtian epoch of the Cretaceous period. It is known solely from isolated teeth from a single species, T. problematica. The genus is named for Thomas Ewing. The species was first described from the late Maastrichtian Kemp Clay Formation of Hunt County, Texas, but has since been found in Maastrichtian strata in the Arkadelphia Formation of Hot Spring County, Arkansas, the Severn Formation of Prince George's County, Maryland, and Fairpoint Member of the Fox Hills Formation in Meade County, South Dakota. This genus was originally named Ewingia; however, this name was found to be preoccupied by a mite found in the gills of certain land crabs. This rendered the name a junior homonym.
