= San Carlos Formation =

Geologic formation in west Texas, United States

- Stratigraphic range: Campanian
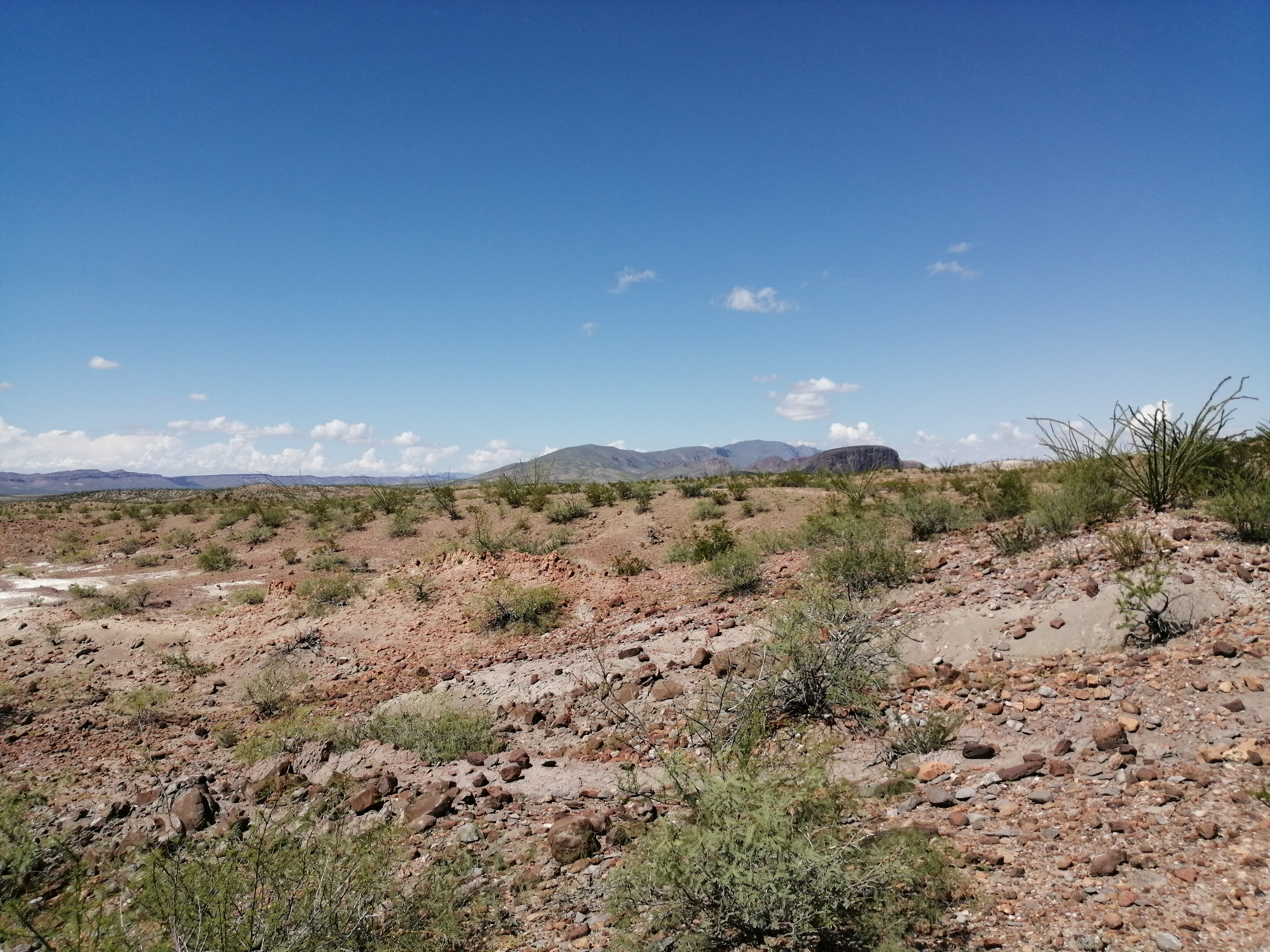
- Exposures of San Carlos Formation at Rancho Don Chuy, Aldama Municipality, Chihuahua.
- Type: Geological formation
- Underlies: Caracol Formation
- Overlies: Picacho Formation

Lithology
- Primary: Sandstone
- Other: Shale

Location
- Region: North America
- Country: Mexico, United States

Type section
- Named for: San Carlos Mine
- Named by: Vaughan, T.W.

The San Carlos Formation is a geological formation in west Texas and east Chihuahua whose strata date back to the Campanian stage of the Late Cretaceous. Dinosaur remains are among the fossils that have been recovered from the formation.

== Plants ==
- Javelinoxylon deca
- Agathoxylon sp.
- Paraphyllanthoxylon anasazi

== Vertebrate paleofauna ==
- Gryposaurus sp.
- Kritosaurus sp. (Gryposaurus sp.)
- Stegoceras sp.
- Deinosuchus sp.

== Invertebrate paleofauna ==
- Mortoniceras
- Brancoceras
- Prionocyclus
- Coilopoceras
- Acanthoceras
- Acompsoceras
- Romaniceras
- Mammites
- Pseudothurmannia

== See also ==
- List of dinosaur-bearing rock formations
