= Pinus susquaensis =

Pinus susquaensis Temporal range: 143–100.5 Ma Early Cretaceous

Scientific classification
- Kingdom: Plantae
- Clade: Tracheophytes
- Clade: Gymnospermae
- Division: Pinophyta
- Class: Pinopsida
- Order: Pinales
- Family: Pinaceae
- Genus: Pinus
- Species: †P. susquaensis

Binomial name
- †Pinus susquaensis Dawson

Extinct species of plant

Pinus susquaensis is an Early Cretaceous pine species known from Western North America, and was first described from fossils collected along the Suskwa River in north Central British Columbia. It is one of the oldest pine species in North America besides Pinus longifolius.
