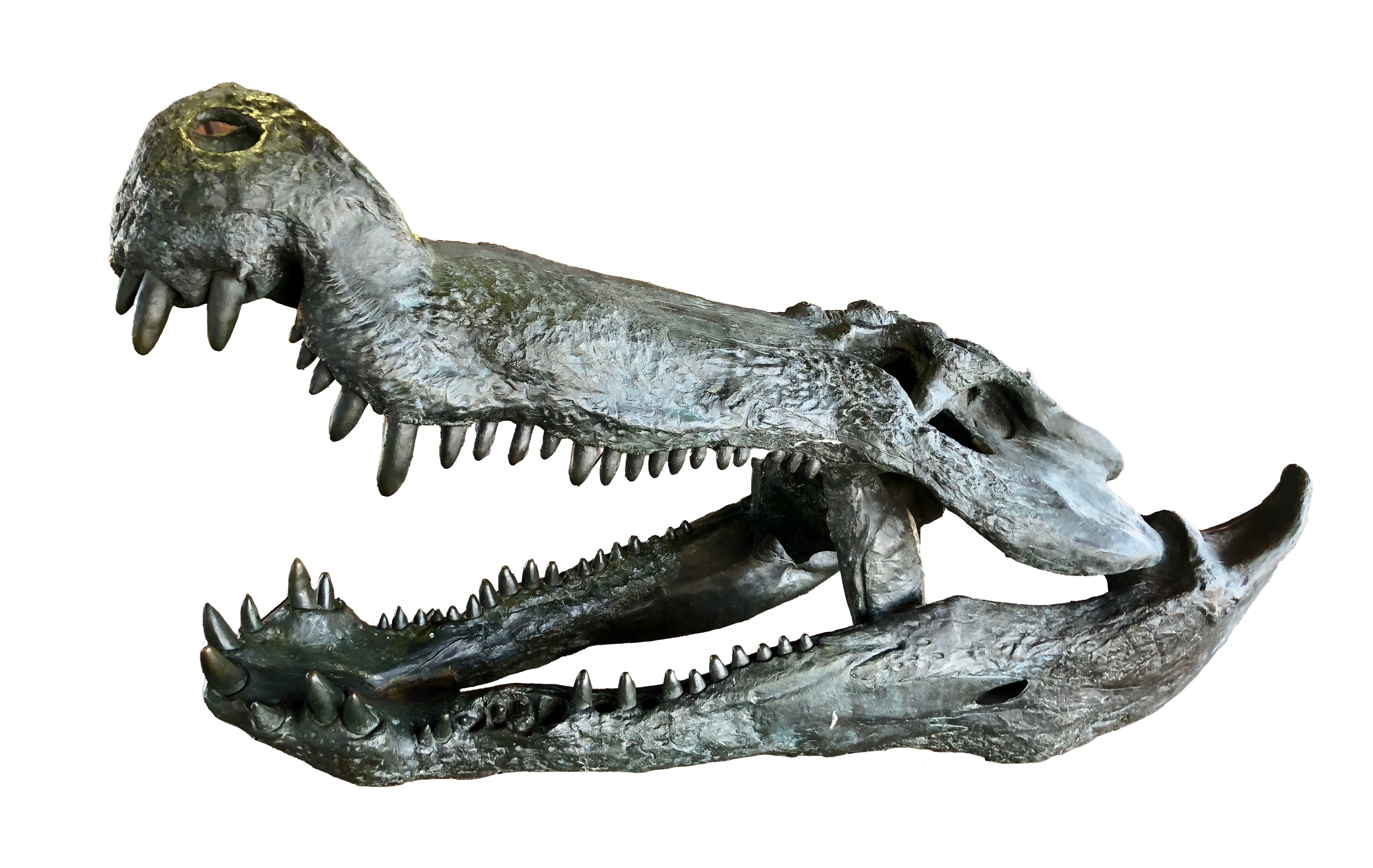
- Reconstructed skull at the Big Bend National Park
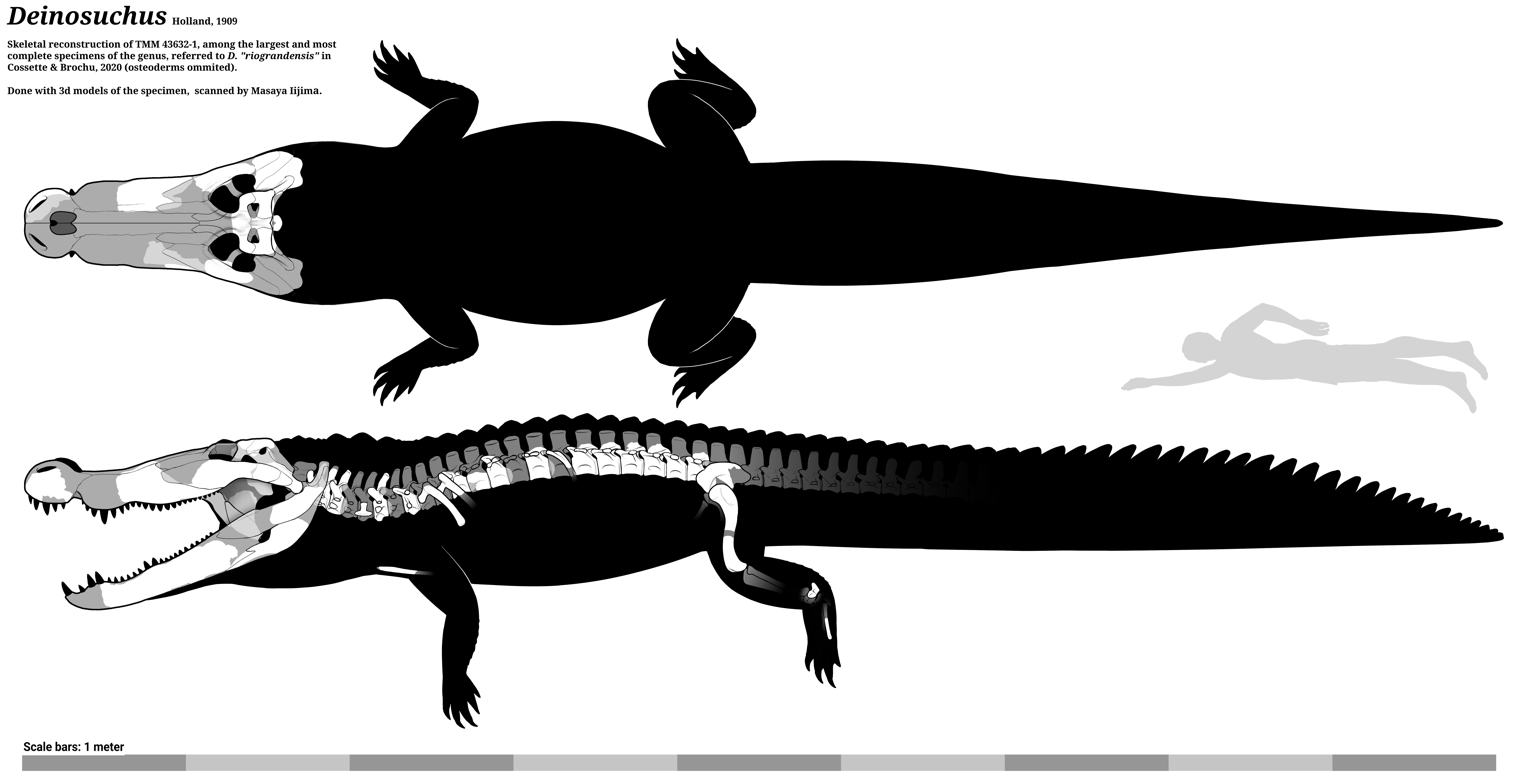
- Skeletal reconstruction and size comparison of a relatively complete specimen

Scientific classification
- Kingdom: Animalia
- Phylum: Chordata
- Class: Reptilia
- Clade: Pseudosuchia
- Clade: Crocodylomorpha
- Clade: Eusuchia
- Genus: †Deinosuchus; Holland, 1909

Type species
- †Deinosuchus hatcheri Holland, 1909

Other species
- †D. rugosus? (Emmons, 1858) [originally Polyptychodon]; †D. riograndensis? (Colbert & Bird, 1954) [originally Phobosuchus]; †D. schwimmeri Cossette & Brochu, 2020

Synonyms
- Polydectes Cope, 1869; Phobosuchus Nopcsa, 1924

= Deinosuchus =

Deinosuchus Temporal range: Late Cretaceous, Campanian Possible late Santonian record

Genus of a giant crocodylian

Deinosuchus is an extinct genus of eusuchian, either an alligatoroid crocodilian or a stem-group crocodilian, which lived during the Late Cretaceous around 82 to 73 million years ago. The first remains were discovered in North Carolina in the 1850s, and the genus was first described in 1909. Additional fragments were discovered in the 1940s and were later incorporated into an influential, though inaccurate, skull reconstruction at the American Museum of Natural History. Knowledge of Deinosuchus remains incomplete, but better cranial and postcranial material found in recent years has expanded scientific understanding of this massive predator.

Although Deinosuchus was far larger than any modern crocodile or alligator, with the largest surpassing 9 meters (30 ft) in total length, its overall appearance was fairly similar to its smaller relatives, but with a proportionally longer skull than modern crocodilians. It had large, robust teeth built for crushing, and its back was covered with thick hemispherical osteoderms. One study indicated Deinosuchus may have lived for up to 50 years, growing at a rate similar to that of modern crocodilians, but maintaining this growth over a much longer time.

Deinosuchus fossils have been discovered in 12 U.S. states, including Texas, Montana, and many along the East Coast. Fossils have also been found in northern Mexico. It lived on both sides of the Western Interior Seaway, and was an opportunistic apex predator in the coastal regions of eastern North America. Deinosuchus reached its largest size in its western habitat, but the eastern populations were far more abundant. Opinion remains divided as to whether these two populations represent separate species. Deinosuchus was probably capable of killing and eating large dinosaurs. It may have also fed upon sea turtles, fish, and other aquatic and terrestrial prey.

== Discovery and naming ==
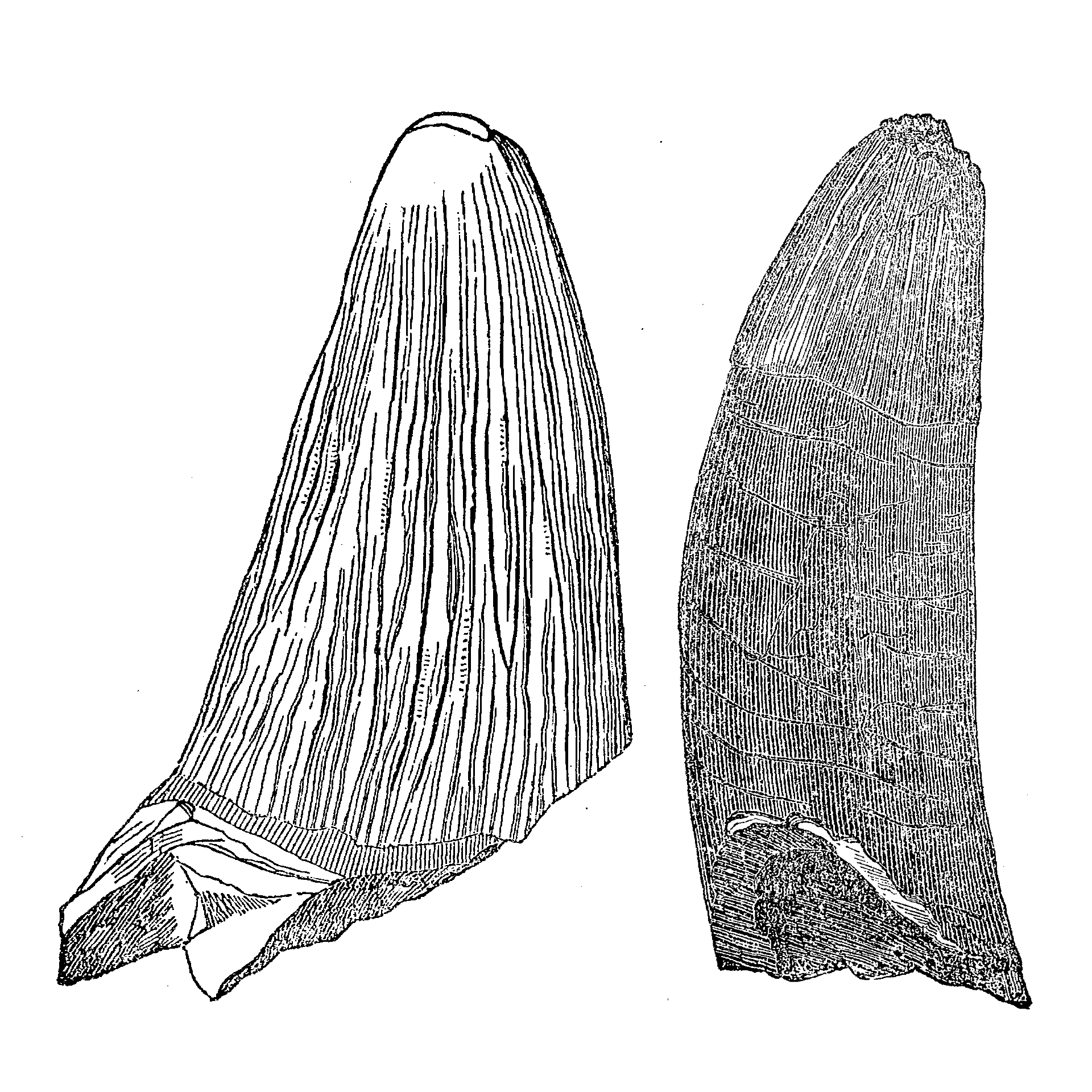
Ebenezer Emmons illustrated two fossil teeth in 1858. Most likely, they belonged to the crocodilian that would later be named Deinosuchus.

In 1858, geologist Ebenezer Emmons described two large fossil teeth found in the Tar Heel Formation of Bladen County, North Carolina. Emmons assigned these teeth to Polyptychodon, which he then believed to be "a genus of crocodilian reptiles". Later discoveries showed that Polyptychodon was actually a pliosaur, a type of marine reptile. The teeth described by Emmons were thick, slightly curved, and covered with vertically grooved enamel; he assigned them a new species name, P. rugosus. Although not initially recognized as such, these teeth were probably the first Deinosuchus remains to be scientifically described. Another large tooth that likely came from Deinosuchus, discovered in Tar Heel sediments from neighboring Sampson County, was named Polydectes biturgidus by Edward Drinker Cope in 1869.

In 1903, at Willow Creek, Montana, several fossil osteoderms were discovered "lying upon the surface of the soil" by John Bell Hatcher and T.W. Stanton. These osteoderms were initially attributed to the ankylosaurid dinosaur Euoplocephalus. Excavation at the site, carried out by W.H. Utterback, yielded further fossils, including additional osteoderms, as well as vertebrae, ribs, and a pubis. When these specimens were examined, it became clear that they belonged to a large crocodilian and not a dinosaur; upon learning this, Hatcher "immediately lost interest" in the material. After Hatcher died in 1904, his colleague W. J. Holland studied and described the fossils. Holland assigned these specimens to a new genus and species, Deinosuchus hatcheri, in 1909. Deinosuchus comes from the Greek δεινός/deinos, meaning "terrible", and σοῦχος/suchos, meaning "crocodile".

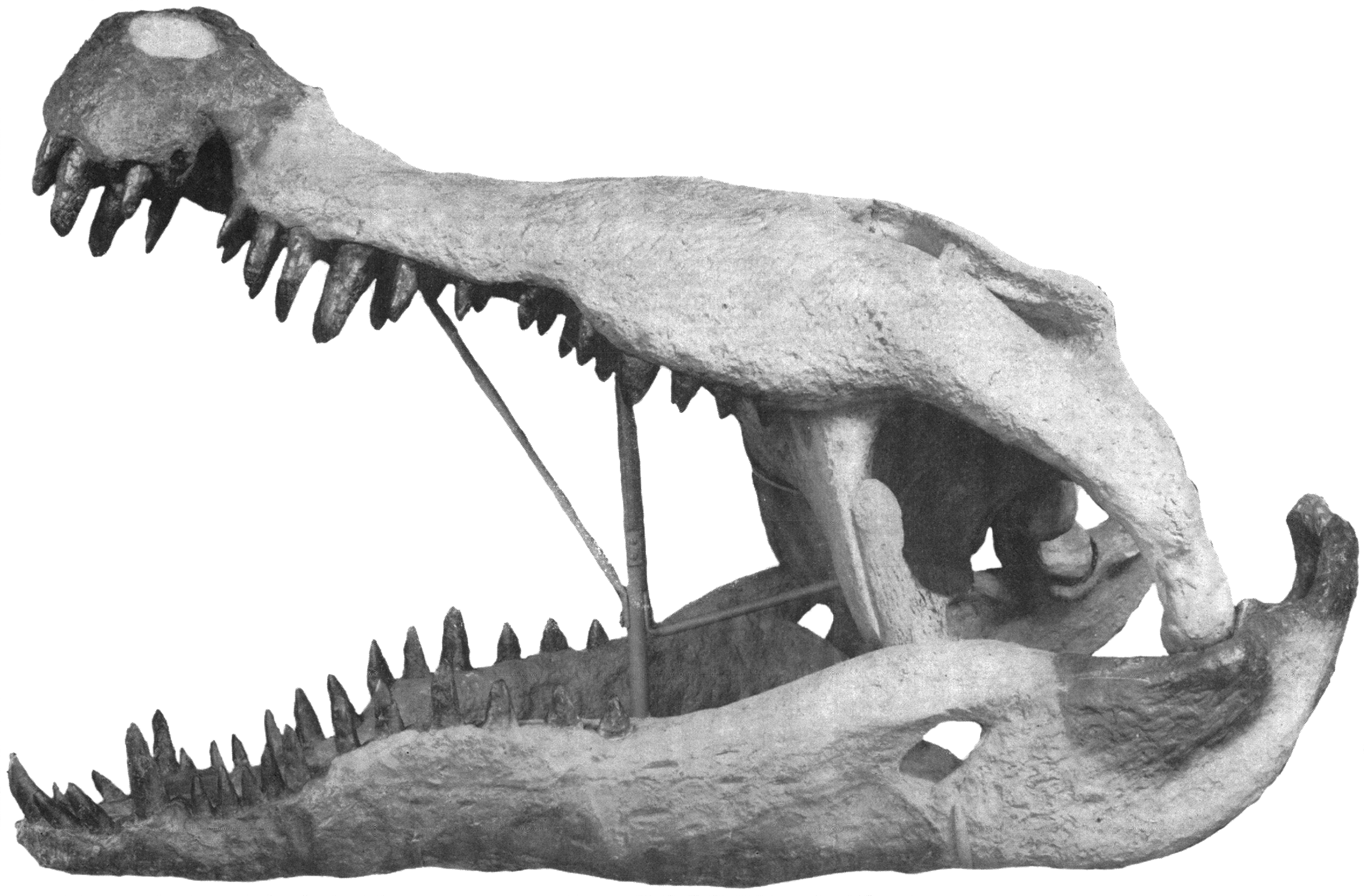
This skull reconstruction, exhibited at the American Museum of Natural History for nearly a half-century, is probably the best known of all Deinosuchus fossils. The darker-shaded portions are actual fossil bone, while the light portions are plaster.

A 1940 expedition by the American Museum of Natural History yielded more fossils of giant crocodilians, this time from Big Bend National Park in Texas. These specimens were described by Edwin H. Colbert and Roland T. Bird in 1954, under the name Phobosuchus riograndensis. Donald Baird and Jack Horner later assigned the Big Bend remains to Deinosuchus, which has been accepted by most modern authorities. The genus name Phobosuchus, which was initially created by Baron Franz Nopcsa in 1924, has since been discarded because it contained a variety of different crocodilian species that turned out to not be closely related to each other. In 2024, the replacement of the type species of Deinosuchus with Phobosuchus riograndensis has been petitioned to the ICZN.

The American Museum of Natural History incorporated the skull and jaw fragments into a plaster restoration, modeled after the present-day Cuban crocodile. Colbert and Bird stated this was a "conservative" reconstruction, since an even greater length could have been obtained if a long-skulled modern species, such as the saltwater crocodile had been used as the template. Because it was not then known that Deinosuchus had a broad snout, Colbert and Bird miscalculated the proportions of the skull, and the reconstruction greatly exaggerated its overall width and length. Despite its inaccuracies, the reconstructed skull became the best-known specimen of Deinosuchus, and brought public attention to this giant crocodilian for the first time.

Numerous additional specimens of Deinosuchus were discovered over the next several decades. Most were quite fragmentary, but they expanded knowledge of the giant predator's geographic range. As noted by Chris Brochu, the osteoderms are distinctive enough that even "bone granola" can adequately confirm the presence of Deinosuchus. Better cranial material was also found; by 2002, David R. Schwimmer was able to create a composite computer reconstruction of 90% of the skull.

== Classification and species ==
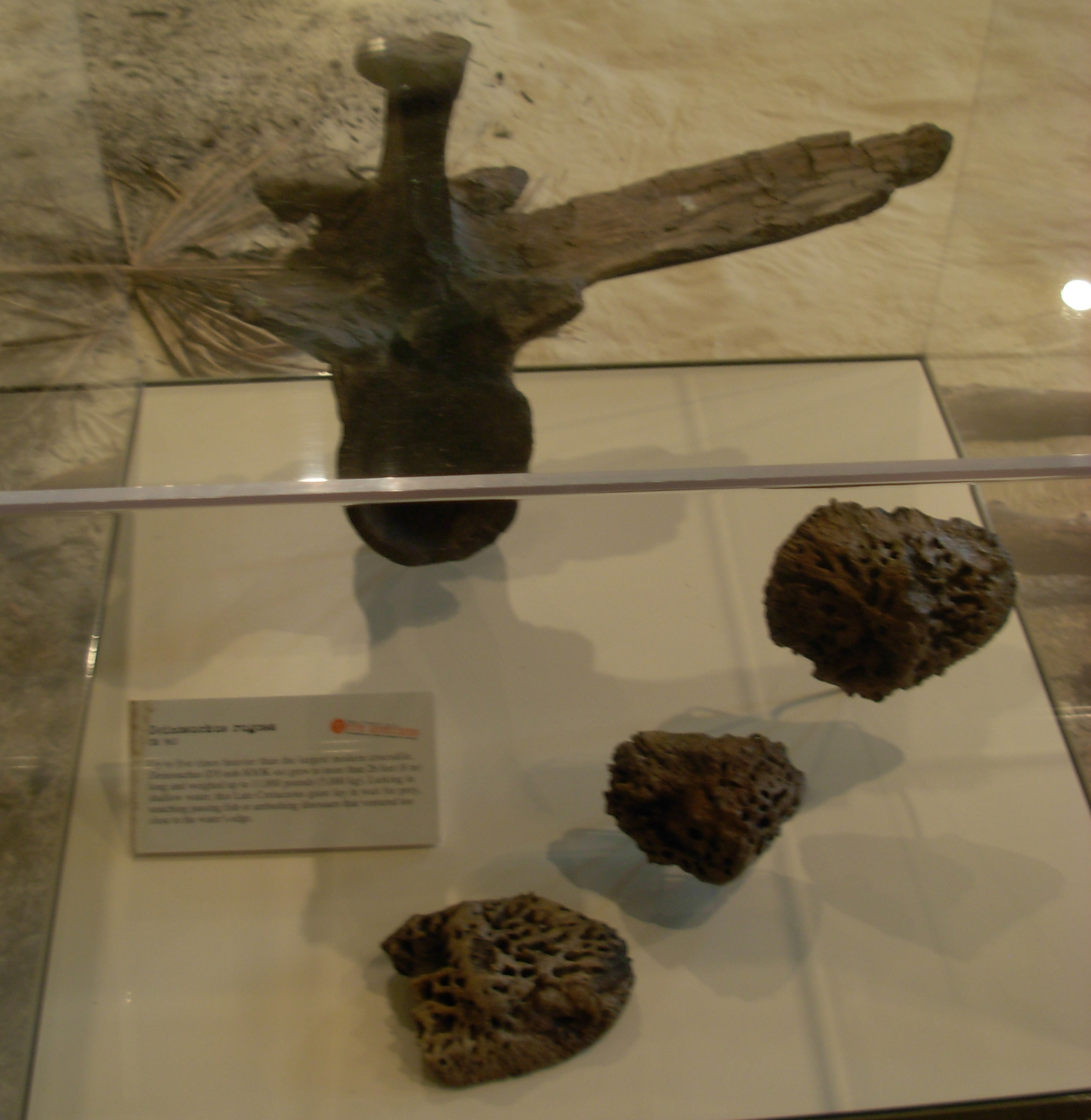
Dorsal vertebra, and some scutes from the holotype of Deinosuchus,Carnegie Museum of Natural History

Since the discovery of the earliest fragmentary remains that would come to be known as Deinosuchus, it was considered a relative of crocodiles and initially placed in their family (Crocodylidae) in 1954 based on dental features. However, the finding of new specimens from Texas and Georgia in 1999 led to phylogenetic analysis placing Deinosuchus in a basal position within the clade Alligatoroidea along with Leidyosuchus. This classification was bolstered in 2005 by the discovery of a well-preserved Deinosuchus brain case from the Blufftown Formation of Alabama, which shows some features reminiscent of those in the modern American alligator, although Deinosuchus was not considered a direct ancestor of modern alligators.

The species pertaining to Deinosuchus since the resurrection of the generic name in 1979 have been traditionally recognized as D. rugosus from Appalachia and the larger D. hatcheri/riograndensis from Laramidia, characterized by differences of the shape of their osteoderms and teeth. However, based on the lack of distinctive enough differences beyond size, they have increasingly been considered all the same species. In their overview of crocodyliform material from the Kaiparowits Formation of Utah, Irmis et al. (2013) noted that D. rugosus is dubious due to its holotype teeth being undiagnostic, and recommended using Deinosuchus hatcheri for Deinosuchus material from Laramidia, while stressing that cranial Deinosuchus material from Appalachia has not been described. In a 2020 study, Cossette and Brochu agreed that D. rugosus is dubious and undiagnostic, rendering it a nomen dubium, and alternatively named a new species D. schwimmeri (named after fellow paleontologist David R. Schwimmer) from Appalachia, which included several specimens previously ascribed to D. rugosus. They also noted that the highly incomplete D. hatcheri holotype can be distinguished by the unique shape of the edge of its indented osteoderms, although this may not be reliable because the osteoderms of the other species may simply not be as well preserved. However, due to the incomplete nature of the type species D. hatcheri, Cossette and Brochu proposed to transfer the type species to the better preserved D. riograndensis, which would allow for improved identification and differentiation of the Deinosuchus species.

Phylogenetic analysis places Deinosuchus as a basal member of Alligatoroidea, as shown in the simplified cladogram below:

- Alligatoroidea
  - Leidyosuchus
  - - Deinosuchus riograndensis
    - Deinosuchus schwimmeri
  - Diplocynodon
  - Alligatoridae
    - Alligatorinae
    - Caimaninae

In a 2025 study, Jules D. Walter and colleagues argue that many character states previously thought to be diagnostic for alligatoroids were actually much more widespread. In their analysis several genera traditionally viewed as basal alligatoroids, among them Deinosuchus, were found to not only fall outside of Alligatoroidea but to not even be true crocodilians, instead representing derived non-crocodilian eusuchians. Deinosuchus was recovered as having split from the lineage leading up to Crocodilia after Leidyosuchus but before the terrestrial Planocraniidae.

- - Leidyosuchus
  - - Deinosuchus
    - - Planocraniidae
      - Crocodilia
        - Longirostres
        - Alligatoroidea
          - Orientalosuchina
          - - Alligatorinae
            - Caimaninae

== Description ==
=== Morphology ===
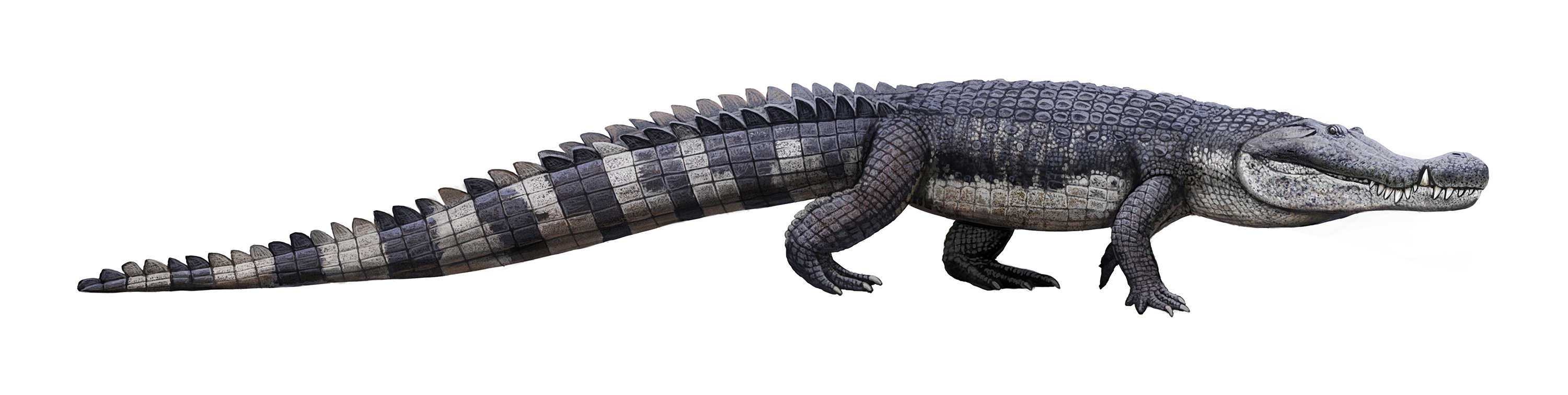
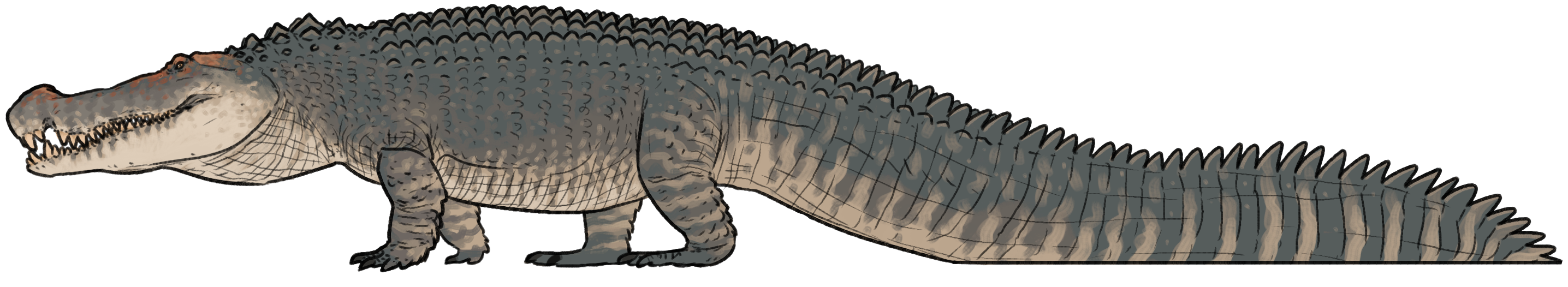
Life restoration of D. schwimmeri (top) and D. hatcheri (bottom)

Despite its large size, the overall appearance of Deinosuchus was not considerably different from that of modern crocodilians. Deinosuchus had an alligator-like, broad snout, with a slightly bulbous tip. Each premaxilla contained teeth, with the pair nearest to the tip of the snout being significantly smaller than the other two. Each maxilla (the main tooth-bearing bone in the upper jaw) contained 23 teeth. The tooth count for each dentary (tooth-bearing bone in the lower jaw) was at least 22. All the teeth were very thick and robust; those close to the rear of the jaws were short, rounded, and blunt. They appear to have been adapted for crushing, rather than piercing. When the mouth was closed, only the fourth tooth of the lower jaw would have been visible. The skull of Deinosuchus itself was of a unique shape not seen in any other living or extinct crocodilians; the skull was broad, but inflated at the front around the nares. Two holes in the premaxilla in front of the nares are present in this genus and are unique autapomorphies not seen in other crocodilians, but nothing is known at present regarding their function.

Modern saltwater crocodiles (Crocodylus porosus) have the strongest recorded bite of any living animal, with a maximum force of 16,414 N (1,673.8 kgf; 3,690 lbf) for a 4.59 meters (15.1 ft), 531 kilograms (1,171 lb) specimen. The bite force of Deinosuchus has been estimated to be 18,000 N (1,835 kgf; 4,047 lbf) to 102,803 N (10,483 kgf; 23,111 lbf).

Deinosuchus had a secondary bony palate, which would have permitted it to breathe through its nostrils while the rest of the head remained submerged underwater. The vertebrae were articulated in a procoelous manner, meaning they had a concave hollow on the front end and a convex bulge on the rear; these would have fit together to produce a ball and socket joint. The secondary palate and procoelous vertebrae are advanced features evolved in the ancestor of eusuchiansn.

The osteoderms (scutes) covering the back of Deinosuchus were unusually large, heavy, and deeply pitted; some were of a roughly hemispherical shape. Deep pits and grooves on these osteoderms served as attachment points for connective tissue. Together, the osteoderms and connective tissue would have served as load-bearing reinforcement to support the massive body of Deinosuchus out of water. These deeply pitted osteoderms have been used to suggest that, despite its bulk, Deinosuchus could probably have walked on land much like modern-day crocodiles. However, more recent analyses of the taxon's hindlimb biomechanics find that Deinosuchus would have run into issues generating enough muscular force to support its body and prevent the adoption of an erect-limbed "high walk" gait. This would have limited Deinosuchus terrestrial capabilities to belly-dragging as its primary mode of locomotion over land, and would suggest the taxon would have spent most of its life in the water.

=== Size ===
D. riograndensis (in yellow) compared to other large crocodyliforms

Size comparison and skeletal reconstruction showcasing what is known of different Deinosuchus specimens

The large size of Deinosuchus has generally been recognized despite the fragmentary nature of the fossils assigned to it. However, estimates of how large it really was have varied considerably over the years. The original estimate from 1954 for the type specimen of the then-named "Phobosuchus riograndensis" were based on a skull of 1.5 meters (4.9 ft) and a lower jaw of 1.8 meters (5.9 ft) long, reconstructed with similar proportions to the Cuban crocodile giving a total estimated length of 15 meters (49 ft). However, this reconstruction is currently considered to be inaccurate. Using more complete remains, it was estimated in 1999 that the size attained by specimens of Deinosuchus varied from 8 to 10 meters (26 to 33 ft) with weights from 2.5 to 5 metric tons (2.8 to 5.5 short tons). This was later corroborated when it was noted that most known specimens of D. rugosus usually had skulls of about 1 meter (3.3 ft) with estimated total lengths of 8 meters (26 ft) and weights of 2.3 metric tons (2.5 short tons). A reasonably well-preserved skull specimen discovered in Texas indicated the animal's head measured about 1.31 meters (4.3 ft), and its body length was estimated at 9.8 meters (32 ft). Schwimmer (2002) suggested the very largest individuals of D. riograndensis could reach sizes up to 12 meters (39 ft), 1.5 times that of the average D. rugosus, based on isometrically scaling vertebral lengths from the type specimens of "Phobosuchus riograndensis" (AMNH 3073) and Deinosuchus hatcheri, which he estimated would represent animals nearly 8.5 metric tons (9.4 short tons). However, Iijima and Kubo (2020) estimated AMNH 3073 to measure 7.37–8.17 meters (24–27 ft) in length using regression equations based on modern crocodilians, as the vertebrae of crocodilians scale with positive allometry.

A particularly large preserved skull from a D. riograndensis specimen was estimated to have come from an individual with a skull length of 147.5 centimeters (4.84 ft). This length was used in conjunction with a regression equation relating skull length to total length in the American alligator to estimate a total length of 10.64 meters (34.9 ft) for this particular specimen. This is only slightly lower than previous estimates for the species. Deinosuchus has often been described as the largest crocodyliform of all time. In their 2025 reclassification of Deinosuchus as a non-crocodylian eusuchian, Walter and colleagues stated that previous estimates may have overestimated its size as the genus has a relatively long snout, but these were based on taxa with shorter snouts such as the American alligator. The authors estimated the maximum total body length of D. riograndensis and D. schwimmeri at 10.5 meters (34 ft) and 7.64 meters (25.1 ft) respectively. They suggested a 95 percentile body length estimate, which they considered more likely, of 7.66 meters (25.1 ft) and 6.37 meters (20.9 ft) respectively and a mean body length of 5.8 meters (19 ft) and 4.83 meters (15.8 ft) respectively, although the authors stated that D. riograndensis specimen AMNH 3073 would have been larger than the specimens used in the study. They also suggested that Purussaurus would have been larger than Deinosuchus.

== Paleobiology ==
=== Diet ===
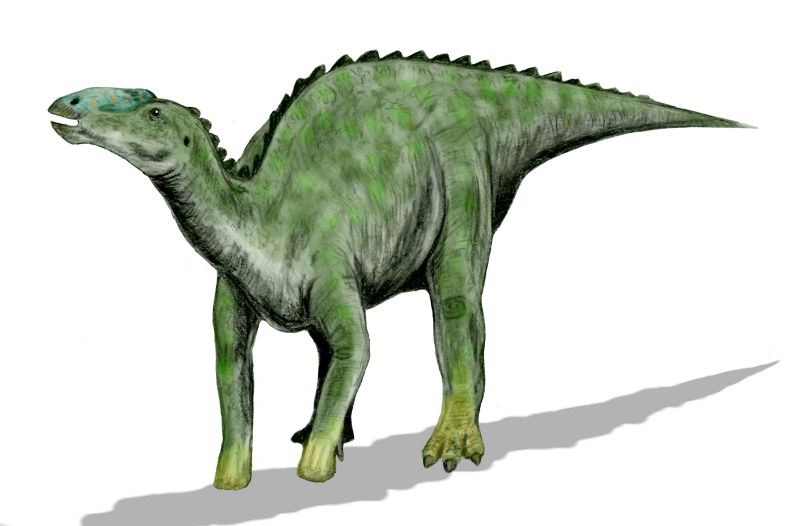
Deinosuchus may have preyed upon large ornithopods. Kritosaurus lived alongside the giant crocodilian in the Aguja Formation ecosystem.

In 1954, Edwin H. Colbert and Roland T. Bird speculated that Deinosuchus "may very well have hunted and devoured some of the dinosaurs with which it was contemporaneous". Colbert restated this hypothesis more confidently in 1961: "Certainly this crocodile must have been a predator of dinosaurs; otherwise why would it have been so overwhelmingly gigantic? It hunted in the water where the giant theropods could not go." David R. Schwimmer proposed in 2002 that several hadrosaurid tail vertebrae found near Big Bend National Park show evidence of Deinosuchus tooth marks, strengthening the hypothesis that Deinosuchus fed on dinosaurs in at least some instances. In 2003, Christopher A. Brochu agreed that Deinosuchus "probably dined on ornithopods from time to time." Deinosuchus is generally thought to have employed hunting tactics similar to those of modern crocodilians, ambushing dinosaurs and other terrestrial animals at the water's edge and then submerging them until they drowned. A 2014 study suggested that it would have been able to perform a "death roll", like modern crocodiles. A 2010 review by Schwimmer noted NJSM 13096, a tyrannosauroid (either an immature Appalachiosaurus or a Dryptosaurus) leg bone in the collection of the New Jersey State Museum recovered from the Ellisdale Fossil Site had bite marks on it.

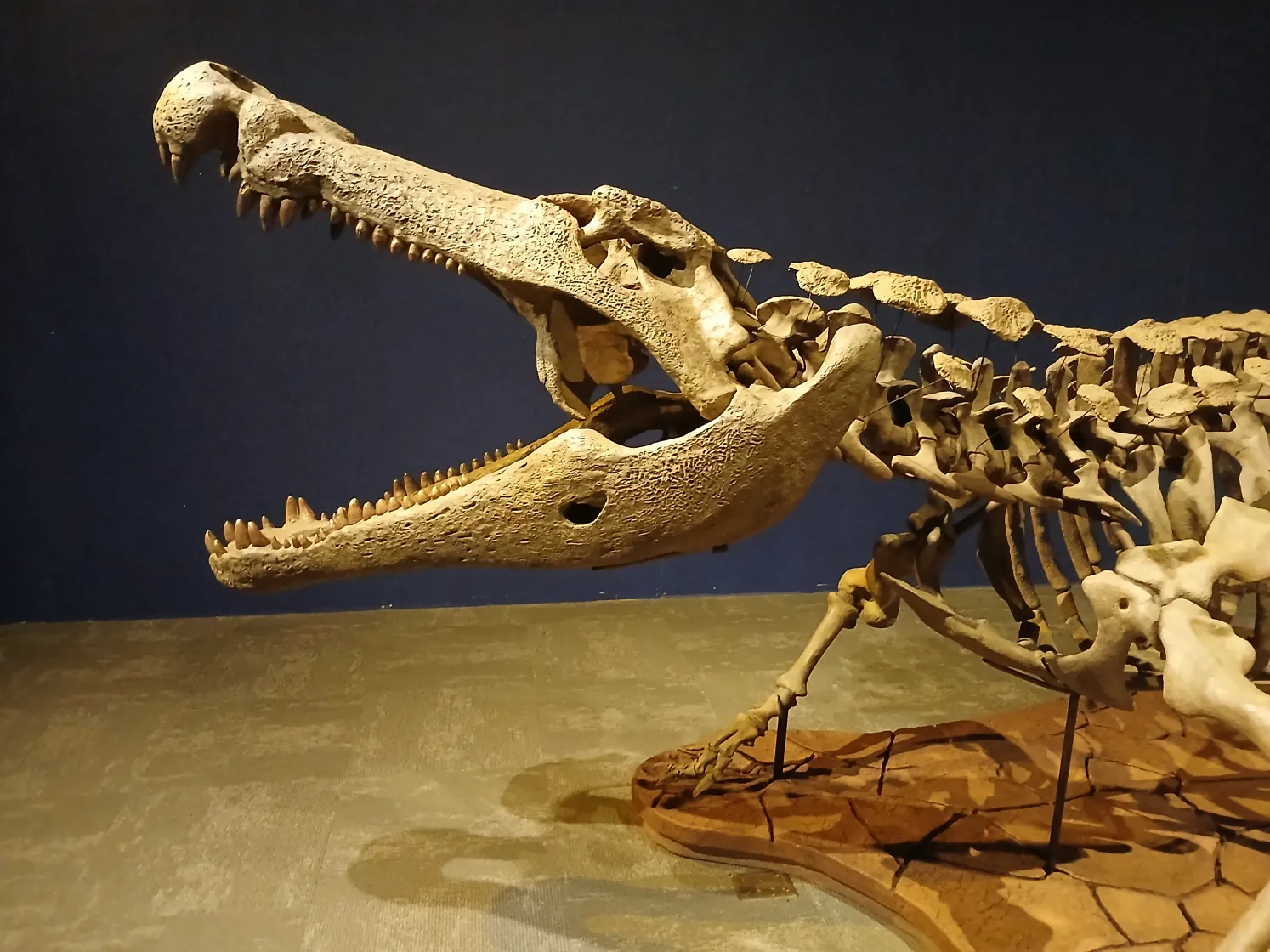
Reconstructed skull and upper body of Deinosuchus, this mount lacks the premaxillary fenestrae

Schwimmer and G. Dent Williams proposed in 1996 that Deinosuchus may have preyed on marine turtles. Deinosuchus would probably have used the robust, flat teeth near the back of its jaws to crush the turtle shells. The "side-necked" sea turtle Bothremys was especially common in the eastern habitat of Deinosuchus, and several of its shells have been found with bite marks that were most likely inflicted by the giant crocodilian.

Schwimmer concluded in 2002 that the feeding patterns of Deinosuchus most likely varied by geographic location; the smaller Deinosuchus specimens of eastern North America would have been opportunistic feeders in an ecological niche similar to that of the modern American alligator. They would have consumed marine turtles, large fish (such as Megalocoelacanthus), and smaller dinosaurs (including young theropods). The bigger, but less common, Deinosuchus that lived in Texas and Montana might have been more specialized hunters, capturing and eating dinosaurs (such as hadrosaurs, ceratopsians, and small and large theropods). Schwimmer noted no theropod dinosaurs in Deinosuchus's eastern range approached its size, indicating the massive crocodilian could have been the region's apex predator.

=== Growth rates ===
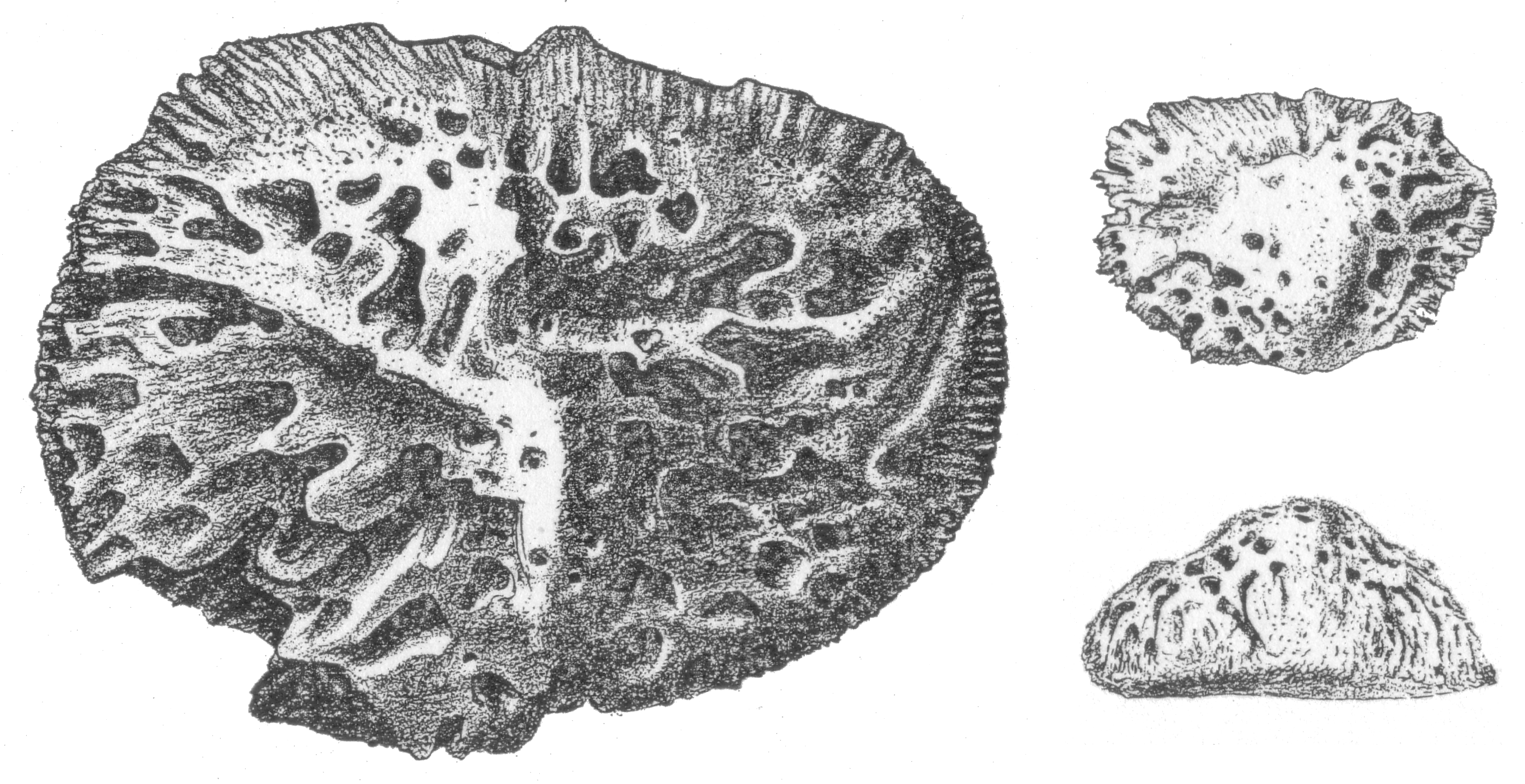
The osteoderms of Deinosuchus, as illustrated by W.J. Holland. They are proportionately much thicker than those of modern crocodilians.

A 1999 study by Gregory M. Erickson and Christopher A. Brochu suggested the growth rate of Deinosuchus was comparable to that of modern crocodilians, but was maintained over a far longer time. Their estimates, based on growth rings in the dorsal osteoderms of various specimens, indicated each Deinosuchus might have taken over 35 years to reach full adult size, and the oldest individuals may have lived for more than 50 years. This was a completely different growth strategy than that of large dinosaurs, which reached adult size much more quickly and had shorter lifespans. According to Erickson, a full-grown Deinosuchus "must have seen several generations of dinosaurs come and go".

Schwimmer noted in 2002 that Erickson and Brochu's assumptions about growth rates are only valid if the osteodermal rings reflect annual periods, as they do in modern crocodilians. According to Schwimmer, the growth ring patterns observed could have been affected by a variety of factors, including "migrations of their prey, wet-dry seasonal climate variations, or oceanic circulation and nutrient cycles". If the ring cycle were biannual rather than annual, this might indicate Deinosuchus grew faster than modern crocodilians, and had a similar maximum lifespan.

== Paleoecology ==
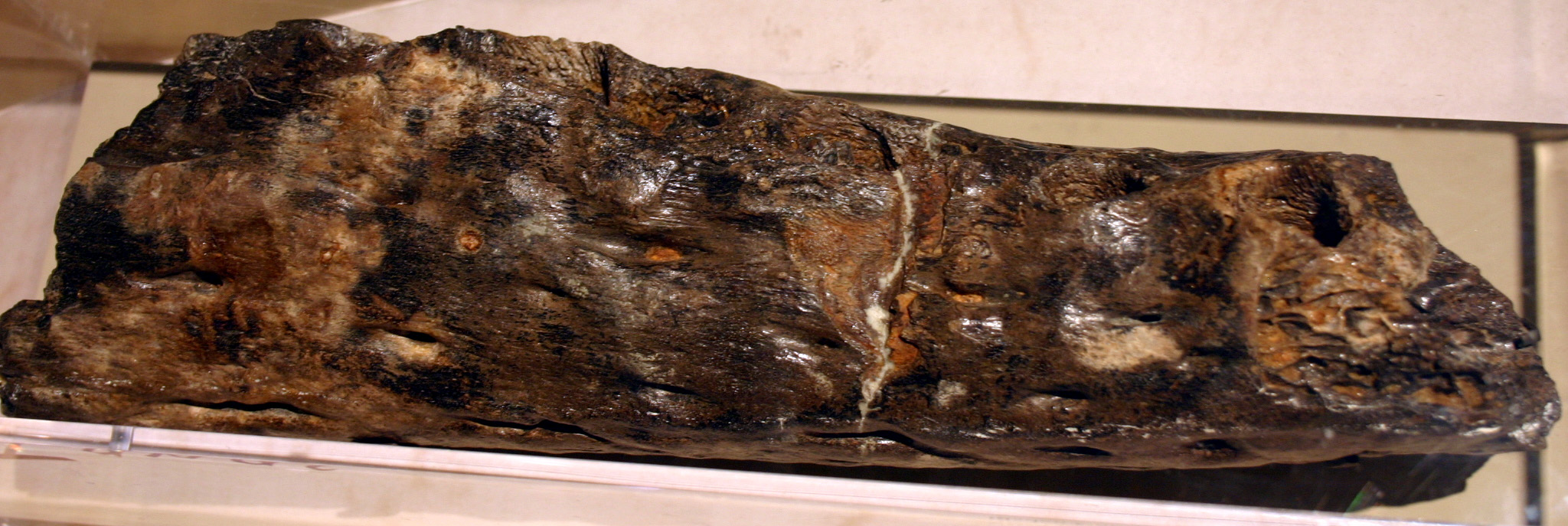
A Deinosuchus jaw fragment, exhibited at the North Carolina Museum of Natural Sciences: Fossils of this large alligatoroid have been discovered in 10 U.S. states and northern Mexico.

Deinosuchus was present on both sides of the Western Interior Seaway. Specimens have been described from 12 U.S. states: Utah, Montana, Wyoming, New Mexico, New Jersey (Marshalltown Formation), Delaware, Georgia, Alabama, Mississippi, Texas, and North & South Carolina (Tar Heel/Coachman & Bladen Formations). A Deinosuchus osteoderm from the San Carlos Formation was also reported in 2006, so the giant crocodilian's range may have included parts of northern Mexico. There is also a report describing a possible Deinosuchus scute from Colorado. Deinosuchus fossils are most abundant in the Gulf Coastal Plain region of Georgia, near the Alabama border. All known specimens of Deinosuchus were found in rocks dated to the Campanian stage of the Late Cretaceous period. The oldest examples of this genus lived approximately 82 Ma, and the youngest lived around 73 Ma. Deinosuchus remains have been unearthed in New Mexico's Menefee Formation.

The distribution of Deinosuchus specimens indicates these giant crocodilians may have preferred estuarine environments. In the Aguja Formation of Texas, where some of the largest specimens of Deinosuchus have been found, these massive predators probably inhabited brackish-water bays. Although some specimens have also been found in marine deposits, it is not clear whether Deinosuchus ventured out into the ocean (like modern-day saltwater crocodiles); these remains might have been displaced after the animals died. Deinosuchus has been described as a "conspicuous" component of a purportedly distinct biome occupying the southern half of Late Cretaceous North America.

It has been suggested by Brownstein that the presence of Deinosuchus may have been responsible for the lack of very large predatory theropods from the Late Cretaceous of Appalachia, with the giant crocodilian replacing such large theropods as the top predator of the Appalachian coastal plains.

== See also ==
- Sarcosuchus
- Stomatosuchus
