= Paralbula =

Paralbula Temporal range: Late Cretaceous-Early Eocene, 99.7–40.4 Ma

Scientific classification
- Kingdom: Animalia
- Phylum: Chordata
- Class: Actinopterygii
- Genus: †Paralbula; Blake, 1940

Extinct genus of fishes

Paralbula is an extinct genus of prehistoric bony fish. They can be found in the Hell Creek Formation, in Montana, United States as well as in the Tar Heel/Coachman Formation in North Carolina, United States.

== See also ==
- Prehistoric fish
- List of prehistoric bony fish
