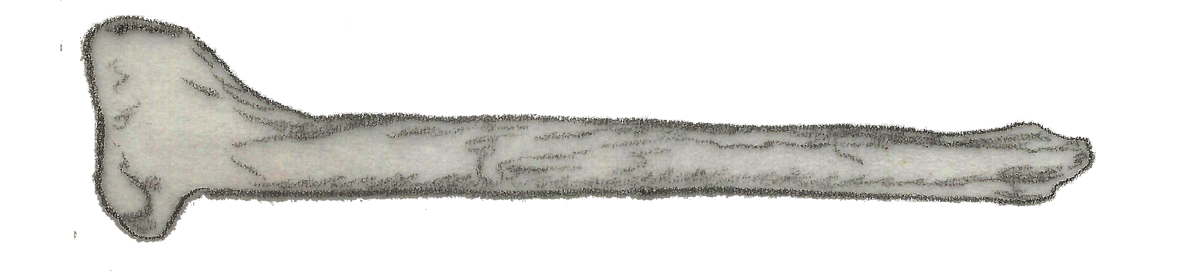
- Holotype tibia

Scientific classification
- Kingdom: Animalia
- Phylum: Chordata
- Class: Reptilia
- Clade: Dinosauria
- Clade: Saurischia
- Clade: Theropoda
- Clade: †Ornithomimosauria
- Family: †Ornithomimidae
- Species: †"Coelosaurus" antiquus

Binomial name
- "Coelosaurus" antiquus

Synonyms
- Ornithomimus antiquus (Leidy, 1865)

= "Coelosaurus" antiquus =

"Coelosaurus" antiquus Temporal range: Late Cretaceous, 70–66 Ma

Extinct species of dinosaur

"Coelosaurus" antiquus ("antique hollow lizard") is a dubious species of theropod dinosaurs. It was named by Joseph Leidy in 1865 for two tibiae found in the Navesink Formation of New Jersey.

This species was later reclassified as a member of the genus Ornithomimus in 1979 by Donald Baird and John R. Horner as Ornithomimus antiquus, and this was followed by some later researchers. However, others have not followed this classification, and have noted that there is no justification for the classification of the New Jersey specimens in a genus known only from western North America. David Weishampel in 2004 considered "C." antiquus to be indeterminate among ornithomimosaurs, and therefore a nomen dubium.

In 1979, Baird and Horner discovered that the name "Coelosaurus" was preoccupied by another dubious taxon (based on a single vertebra), named Coelosaurus by an anonymous author now known to be Richard Owen in 1854.

Ornithomimid material known from the Severn Formation of Maryland and the Mooreville Chalk and Blufftown formations of Alabama and Georgia have also been assigned to this species. A specimen once assigned to Coelosaurus that was discovered in the Merchantville Formation of Delaware during the 1970s has since been assigned to "Cryptotyrannus".

== See also ==
- Timeline of ornithomimosaur research
