= Plicatoscyllium =

Plicatoscyllium Temporal range: Middle Campanian-Maastrichtian Possible Eocene record

Scientific classification
- Domain: Eukaryota
- Kingdom: Animalia
- Phylum: Chordata
- Class: Chondrichthyes
- Subclass: Elasmobranchii
- Division: Selachii
- Order: Orectolobiformes
- Family: Ginglymostomatidae
- Genus: †Plicatoscyllium; Case and Cappetta 1997

Species
- Plicatoscyllium derameei Case and Cappetta 1997; Plicatoscyllium gharbii Noubhani and Cappetta 1997; Plicatoscyllium globidens Cappetta and Case 1975; Plicatoscyllium lehneri Leriche 193; Plicatoscyllium minutum Forir 1887; Plicatoscyllium youssoufiaense Noubhani and Cappetta 1997

Extinct genus of orectolobiform shark

Plicatoscyllium is an extinct genus of orectolobiform shark known from deposits of Late Cretaceous age in France, Jordan, the Netherlands, Syria and the United States. Remains tentatively referrable to the genus from Cenozoic deposits have been discovered in Saudi Arabia.

The genus was named by G.R. Case and H. Cappetta in 1997 to refer to species formerly considered species of Ginglymostoma, namely the species G. gharbii, G. youssoufiaense and G. minutum. Furthermore, the species G. globidens was considered to possibly represent a species of Plicatyoscyllium.

Furthermore, the species of G. lehneri and G. rugosum were synonymized with P. minutum, which would have been a wide-ranging species known from western Africa, eastern North America and Europe.

Teeth referred to the genus have been found in association with remains of the giant mosasaur Prognathodon saturator, which along with bite marks on the bones of the mosasaur specimen indicated that individuals of the genus had scavenged off the corpse of the mosasaur.
