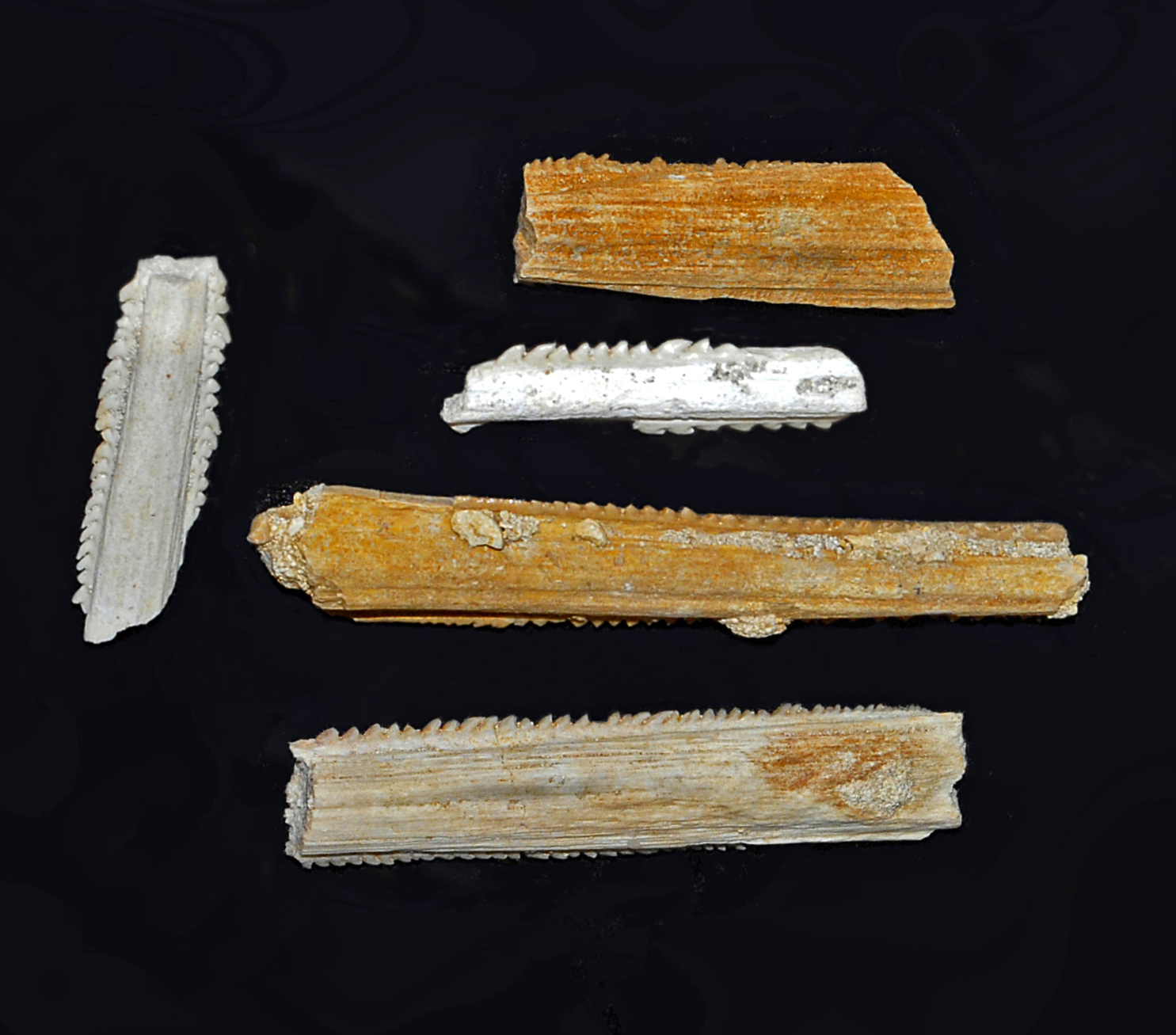
- Fossil tail spines of Rhombodus meridionalis from Khouribga (Morocco.)

Scientific classification
- Kingdom: Animalia
- Phylum: Chordata
- Class: Chondrichthyes
- Subclass: Elasmobranchii
- Order: Myliobatiformes
- Family: †Rhombodontidae
- Genus: †Rhombodus; Dames, 1881

= Rhombodus =

Rhombodus Temporal range: Cretaceous - Paleocene

Extinct genus of cartilaginous fishes

Rhombodus is a prehistoric genus of ray belonging to the family Rhombodontidae.

Species within this genus lived from the Cretaceous period, Maastrichtian age to the Paleocene epoch, from 70.6 to 55.8 million years ago.

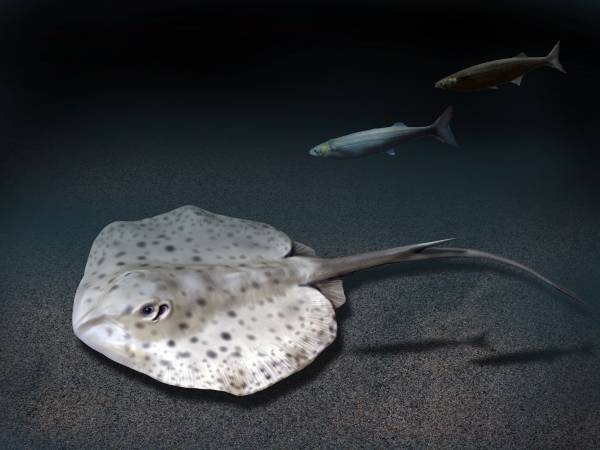
Life reconstruction of Rhombodus binkhorsti

== Species ==
Species within this genus include:

- Rhombodus andriesi Noubhani and Cappetta 1994
- Rhombodus binkhorsti Dames, 1881 North America
- Rhombodus bondoni Arambourg 1952
- Rhombodus carentonensis Vullo 2005
- Rhombodus ibericus Kriwet et al. 2007
- Rhombodus laevis Cappetta and Case 1975
- Rhombodus meridionalis Arambourg 1952
- Rhombodus microdon Arambourg 1952

== Description ==
Rhombodus species could reach a length of 75–100 centimetres (30–39 in). This genus is known from its caudal spines and rhombic teeth, which are all that usually fossilises. These rhombic teeth are bilobate, with vertical wrinkles and a width of about 1.5 centimetres (0.59 in).

== Distribution ==
Fossils have been found in the sediments of Africa, Europe, Asia and the Americas.

== See also ==
- Flora and fauna of the Maastrichtian stage
- List of prehistoric cartilaginous fish (Chondrichthyes)
