= List of the Mesozoic life of New Jersey =

This list of the Mesozoic life of New Jersey contains the various prehistoric life-forms whose fossilized remains have been reported from within the US state of New Jersey and are between 252.17 and 66 million years of age.

== A ==
- †Abietineaepollenites
  - †Abietineaepollenites aequalis
  - †Abietineaepollenites microalatus – or unidentified comparable form
  - †Abietineaepollenites microreticulatus
  - †Abietineaepollenites microsaccus
- †Acanthichnus
- Acipenser
- Acteon
- †Acutostrea
  - †Acutostrea plumosa
- †Adocus – type locality for genus
  - †Adocus agilis – type locality for species
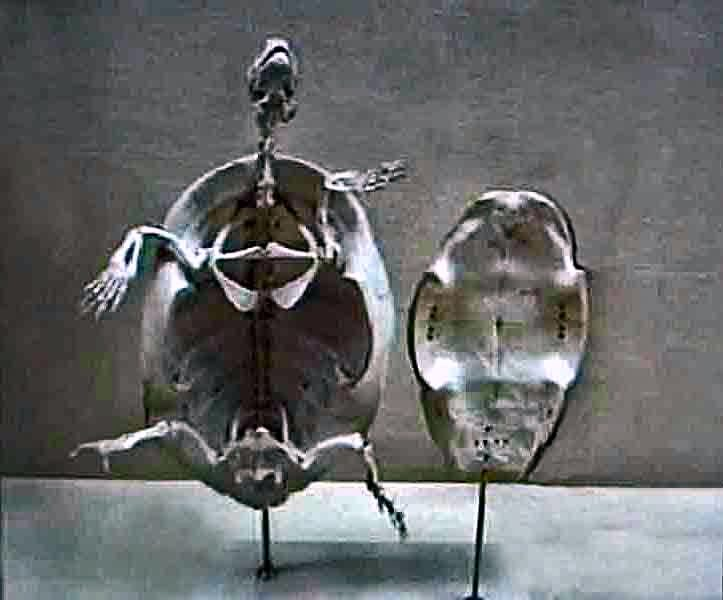
  - Fossilized skeleton of the Early Cretaceous-Oligocene turtle Adocus beatus
    †Adocus beatus – type locality for species
  - †Adocus firmus – type locality for species
  - †Adocus microglypha – type locality for species
  - †Adocus parvus
  - †Adocus pravus – type locality for species
  - †Adocus striatula – type locality for species
  - †Adocus syntheticus – type locality for species
- †Aenona
  - †Aenona eufaulensis
- †Aequitriradites
  - †Aequitriradites insolitus – type locality for species
  - †Aequitriradites spinulosus
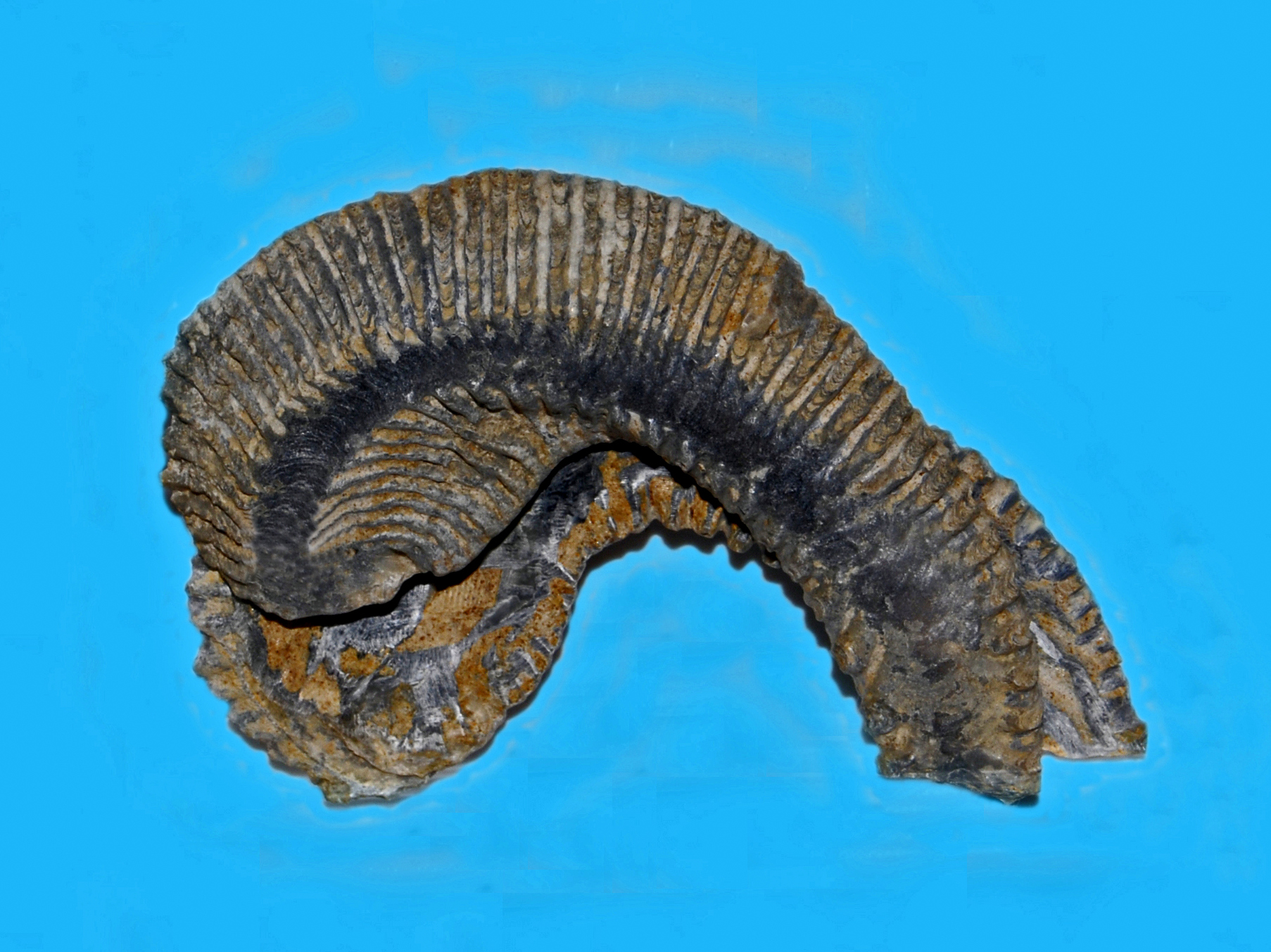
- Fossilized shell of the Late Cretaceous oyster Agerostrea
  †Agerostrea
  - †Agerostrea mesenterica
  - †Agerostrea monmouthensis
  - †Agerostrea nasuta
  - †Agerostrea ungulata
- †Agomphus
  - †Agomphus pectoralis – type locality for species
- †Agorostrea
  - †Agorostrea falcata
  - †Agorostrea mesenterica
- †Agraylea
  - †Agraylea cretaria – type locality for species
  - †Agraylea lentiginosa – type locality for species
  - †Agraylea parva – type locality for species
- †Alautunmyia – type locality for genus
  - †Alautunmyia elongata – type locality for species
- †Aliofusus
  - †Aliofusus sayri
- †Alisporites
  - †Alisporites thomasii – or unidentified comparable form
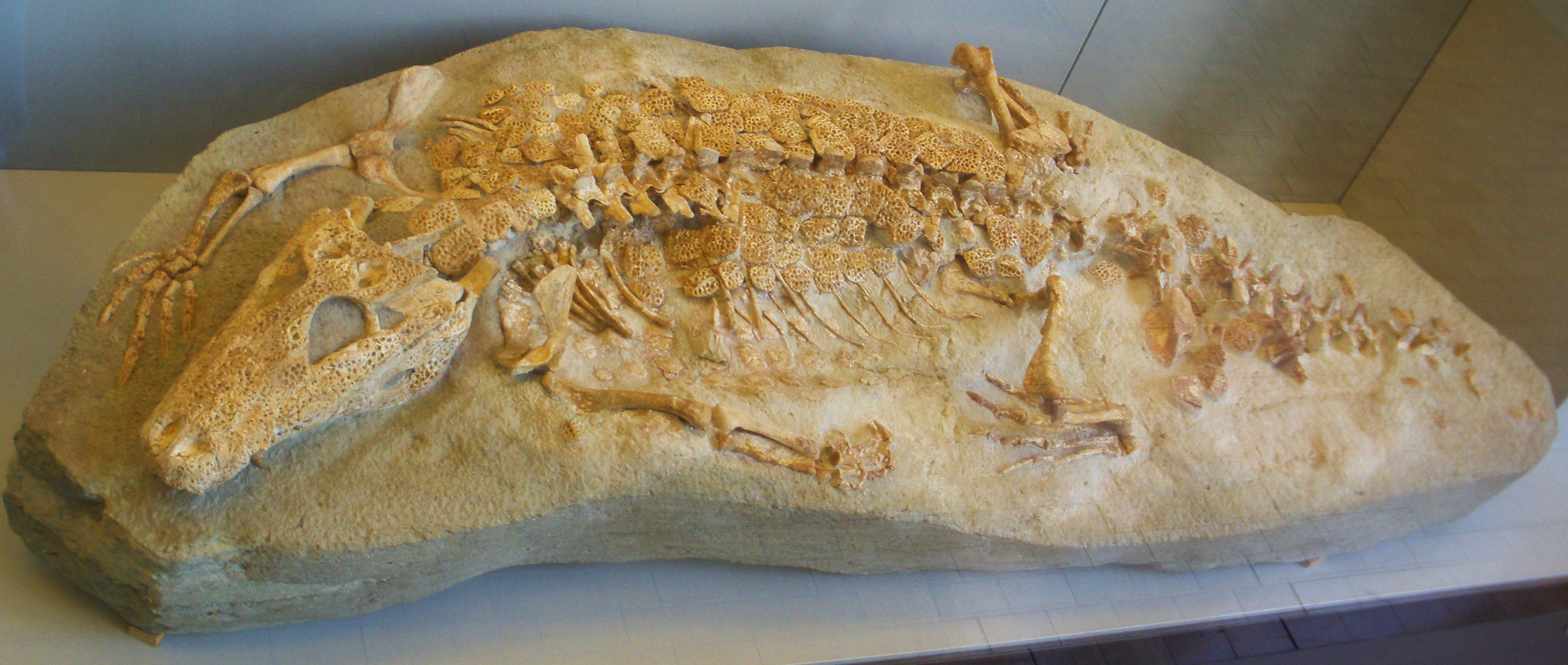
- Fossilized skeleton of the Late Cretaceous-Oligocene Alligator relative Allognathosuchus
  †Allognathosuchus – or unidentified related form
- †Amaurellina
  - †Amaurellina stephensoni
- Amauropsis
  - †Amauropsis cadwaladeri
- †Ambermantis – type locality for genus
  - †Ambermantis wozniaki – type locality for species
- †Ambigostrea
  - †Ambigostrea tecticosta
- †Ambonicardia
  - †Ambonicardia cookii
- †Ameghinichnus
- †Amerogenia – type locality for genus
  - †Amerogenia macrops – type locality for species
- Amia
  - †Amia fragosa – or unidentified comparable form
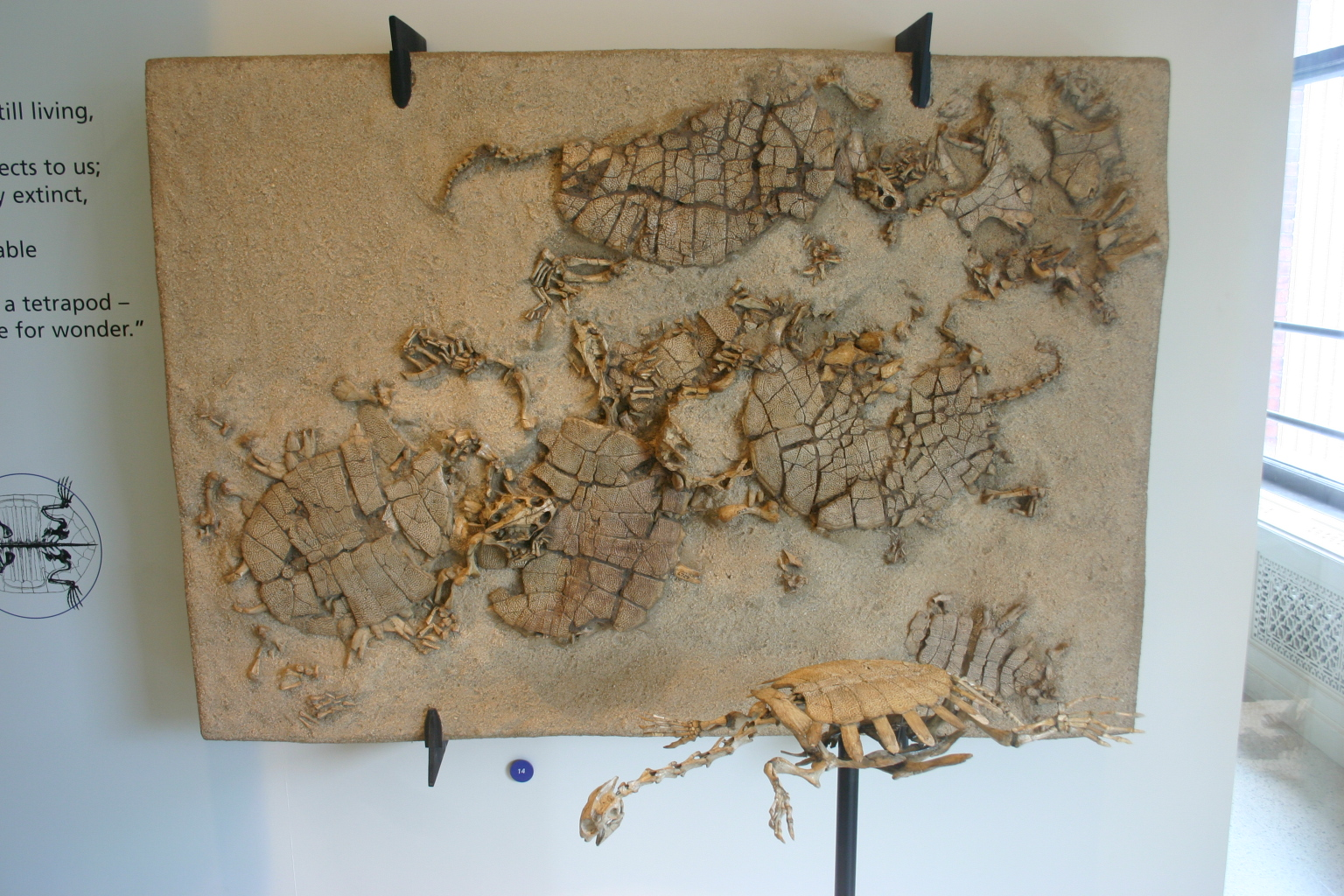
- Assemblage of fossilized skeletons of the softshell turtle Amyda
  †Amyda
  - †Amyda prisca – type locality for species
- †Anatalavis
  - †Anatalavis rex – type locality for species
- †Anatimya
  - †Anatimya anteradiata
  - †Anatimya lata
- †Anchisauripus
  - †Anchisauripus minusculum
  - †Anchisauripus parallelus
  - †Anchisauripus sillimani
  - †Anchisauripus tuberosus
- †Anchura
  - †Anchura abrupta
  - †Anchura bakeri
  - †Anchura pennata
  - †Anchura raritanensis
  - †Anchura rostrata
- †Anisomyon
- †Ankylosaurus
- †Anomia
  - †Anomia argentaria
  - †Anomia tellinoides – tentative report
- †Anomoedus
  - †Anomoedus phaseolus
- †Anomoeodus
  - †Anomoeodus phaseolus
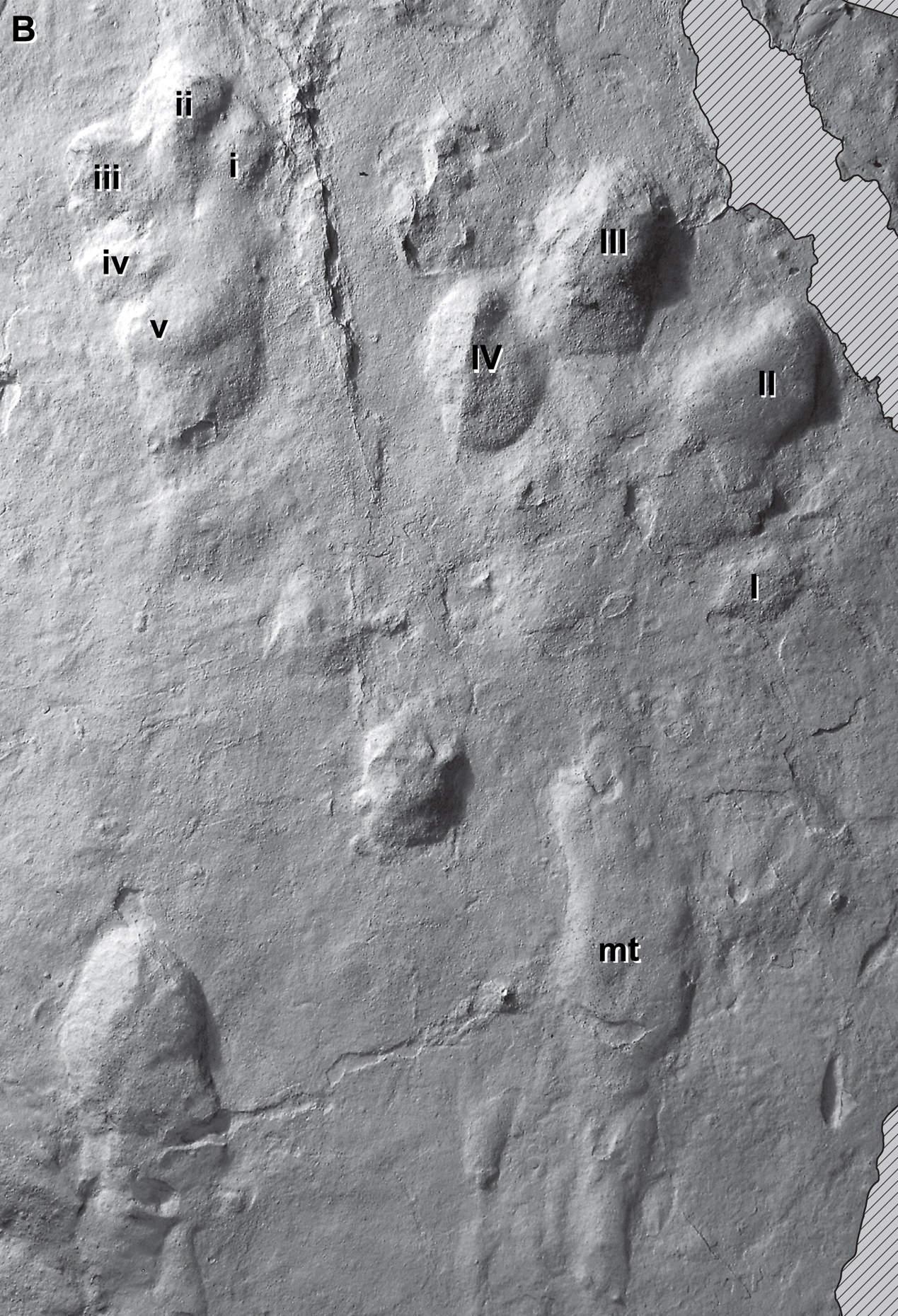
- Fossil (right) of the Early Jurassic dinosaur footprint ichnogenus Anomoepus
  †Anomoepus
  - †Anomoepus crassus – type locality for species
  - †Anomoepus intermedius
  - †Anomoepus scambus
- †Apatopus
  - †Apatopus lineatus
- †Aphrodina
  - †Aphrodina cretacea
  - †Aphrodina eufaulensis
  - †Aphrodina johnsoni
- †Apoglaesoconis – type locality for genus
  - †Apoglaesoconis ackermani – type locality for species
  - †Apoglaesoconis cherylae – type locality for species
  - †Apoglaesoconis luzzii – type locality for species
  - †Apoglaesoconis swolenskyi – type locality for species
- Appendicisporites
  - †Appendicisporites ethmos – or unidentified comparable form
  - †Appendicisporites multicornutus – type locality for species
  - †Appendicisporites tricornitatus
- †Arambourgiania – or unidentified comparable form
- †Araucariacites
  - †Araucariacites australis
- Arca
  - †Arca enfaulensis
  - †Arca saffordi
- †Arcellites
  - †Arcellites caudatus – type locality for species
  - †Arcellites mirabilis – type locality for species
  - †Arcellites nudus
- †Archaeostephanus – type locality for genus
  - †Archaeostephanus corae – type locality for species
- †Archaeromma
  - †Archaeromma carnifex – type locality for species
- †Archaeserropalpus – type locality for genus
  - †Archaeserropalpus cretaceus – type locality for species
- †Archichrysotus
  - †Archichrysotus incompletus – type locality for species
- †Archicnephia – type locality for genus
  - †Archicnephia ornithoraptor – type locality for species
- †Archimelzira – type locality for genus
  - †Archimelzira americana – type locality for species
- †Archiphora – type locality for genus
  - †Archiphora pria – type locality for species
- †Argoides
  - †Argoides macrodactylus
- †Arroges
  - †Arroges rostrata
- †Ascaulocardium
  - †Ascaulocardium armatum
- Astarte
  - †Astarte annosa
  - †Astarte crenulirata
  - †Astarte octolirata
  - †Astarte parilis
  - †Astarte veta
- Astrangia
  - †Astrangia cretacea
- Ataphrus
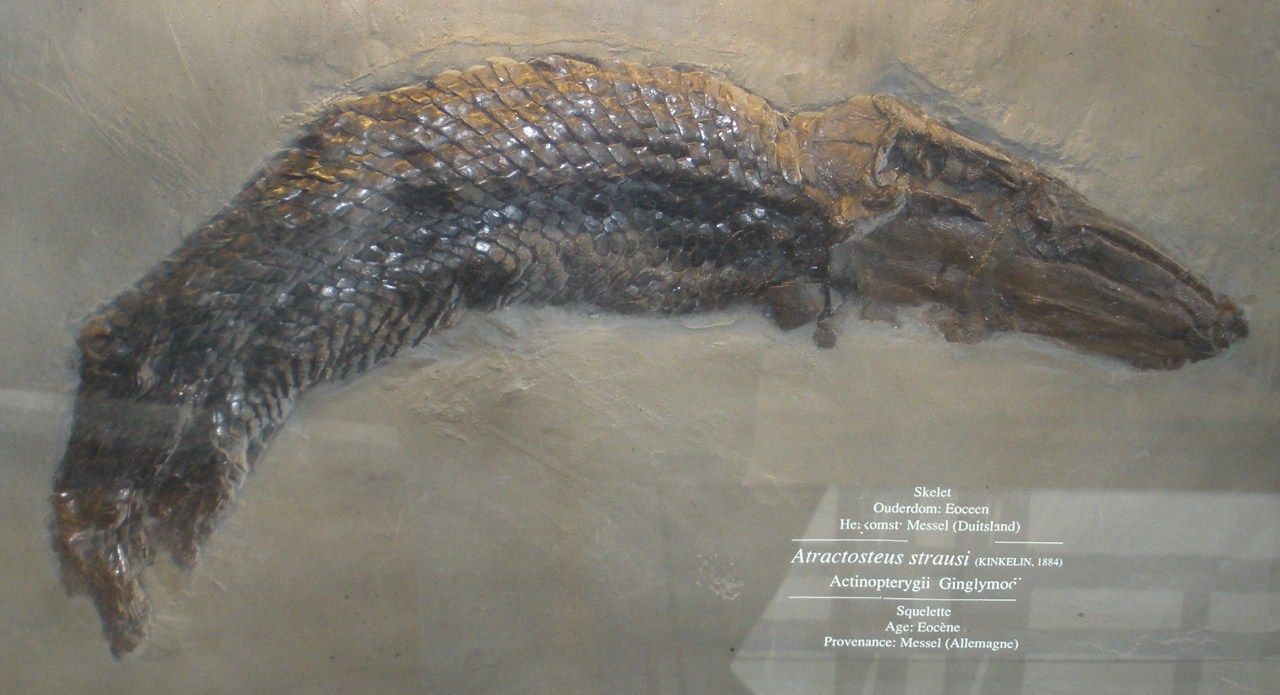
- Fossilized skeleton of the gar Atractosteus
  Atractosteus
- †Atreipus
  - †Atreipus milfordensis – type locality for species
- Attagenus
  - †Attagenus turonianensis – type locality for species
- †Aureophlebia – type locality for genus
  - †Aureophlebia sinitshenkovae – type locality for species
- †Avellana
  - †Avellana bullata
  - †Avellana pelagana
  - †Avellana raritana
- †Axonoceras
  - †Axonoceras angolanum – or unidentified comparable form

== B ==
- †Baculites
  - †Baculites claviformis
  - †Baculites haresi
  - †Baculites ovatus
  - †Baculites scotti – tentative report
  - †Baculites vaalsensis
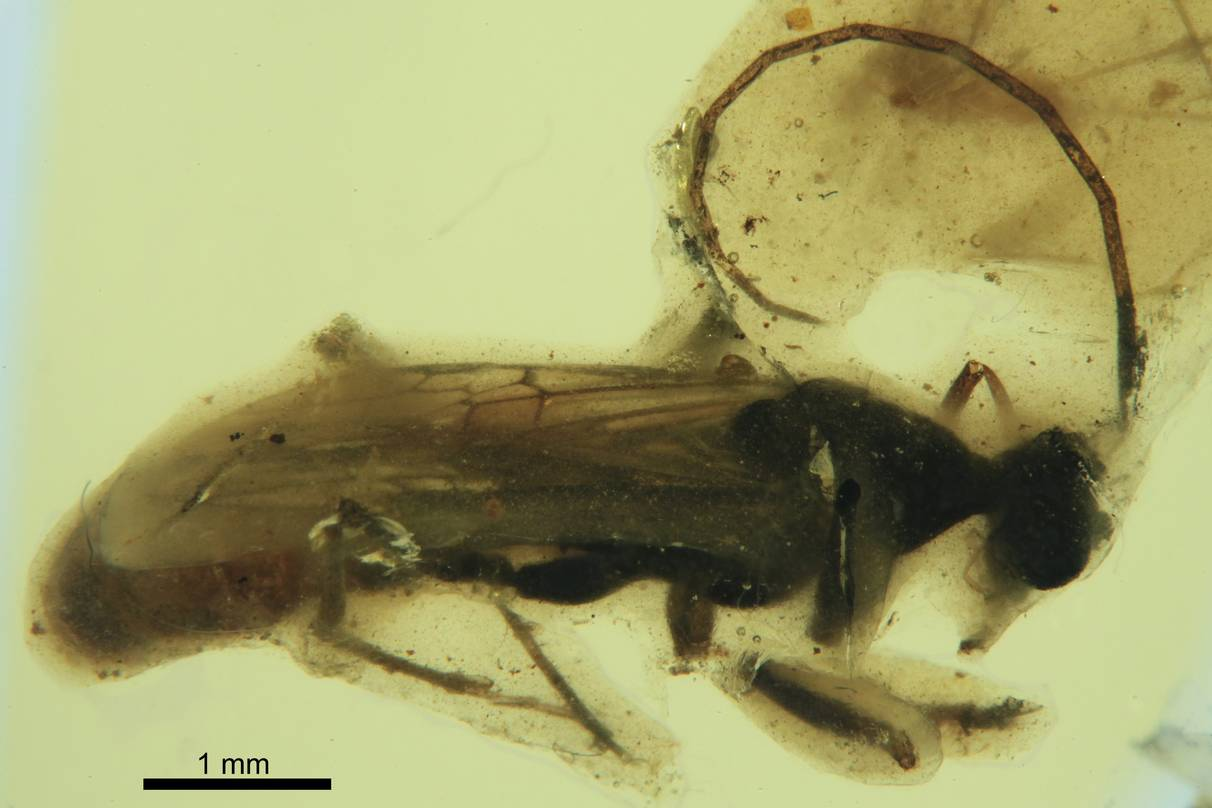
- Amber-entombed specimen of the Early-Late Cretaceous ant Baikuris
  †Baikuris
  - †Baikuris casei – type locality for species
- †Balmeisporites
  - †Balmeisporites glenelgensis
  - †Balmeisporites holodictyus
- Barbatia
  - †Barbatia uniopsis
- †Batrachopus
  - †Batrachopus gracilis
- †Belemnitella
  - †Belemnitella americana
- †Bellifusus
  - †Bellifusus curvicostatus
- Bernaya
  - †Bernaya burlingtonensis – type locality for species
- †Boodlepteris
  - †Boodlepteris turoniana
- †Boreobythus – type locality for genus
  - †Boreobythus turonius – type locality for species
- †Borephemera – type locality for genus
  - †Borephemera goldmani – type locality for species
- †Bothremys
  - †Bothremys cooki – type locality for species
- †Bottosaurus
  - †Bottosaurus harlani – type locality for species
- Botula
  - †Botula ripleyana
- Brachaelurus
  - †Brachaelurus hornerstownensis – type locality for species
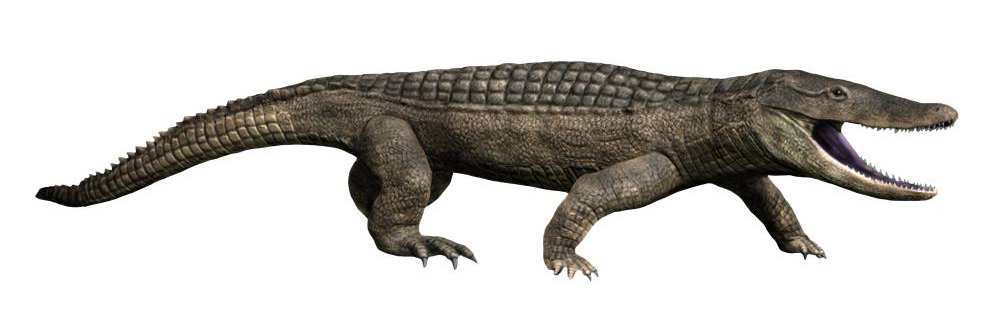
- Life restoration of the Late Cretaceous Alligator relative Brachychampsa
  †Brachychampsa – or unidentified comparable form
- †Brachychirotherium
- †Brachyrhizodus
  - †Brachyrhizodus wichitaensis
- †Brontozoum
  - †Brontozoum approximatum
  - †Brontozoum giganteum
  - †Brontozoum sillimanium
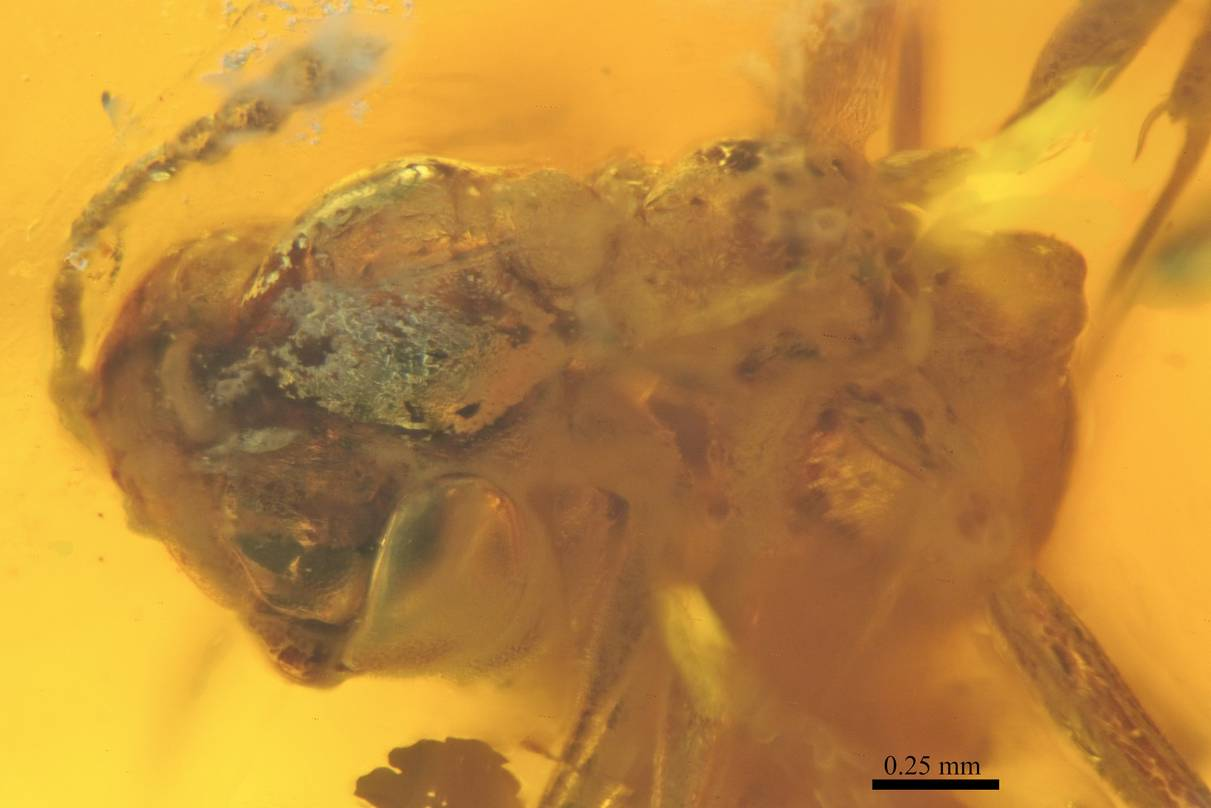
- Amber-entombed specimen of the Late Cretaceous ant Brownimecia
  †Brownimecia – type locality for genus
  - †Brownimecia clavata – type locality for species

== C ==
- Caestocorbula
  - †Caestocorbula crassaplica
  - †Caestocorbula crassiplica
  - †Caestocorbula percompressa
- †Callialasporites
  - †Callialasporites insuetus – type locality for species
- Callianassa
  - †Callianassa mortoni
- †Calliomphalus
  - †Calliomphalus americanus
  - †Calliomphalus microcancelli
- †Camarozonosporites
  - †Camarozonosporites rudis
- †Camptonectes
  - †Camptonectes argillensis
  - †Camptonectes bellisculptus
  - †Camptonectes bubonis
  - †Camptonectes burlingtonensis
  - †Camptonectes parvus
- †Caprotina
  - †Caprotina jerseyensis
- †Cardiaster
  - †Cardiaster smocki
- Cardita
  - †Cardita subquadrata
- Cardium
  - †Cardium enfaulense
  - †Cardium raritanensis
  - †Cardium sayri
- †Carinatermes – type locality for genus
  - †Carinatermes nascimbeni – type locality for species
- †Carios
  - †Carios jerseyi
- †Casstrochaena
  - †Casstrochaena whitfieldi
- Catapleura
  - †Catapleura ponderosa – type locality for species
  - †Catapleura repanda – type locality for species
- †Catopygus
  - †Catopygus pusillus
  - †Catopygus williamsi
- †Cenomanocarcinus
  - †Cenomanocarcinus robertsi
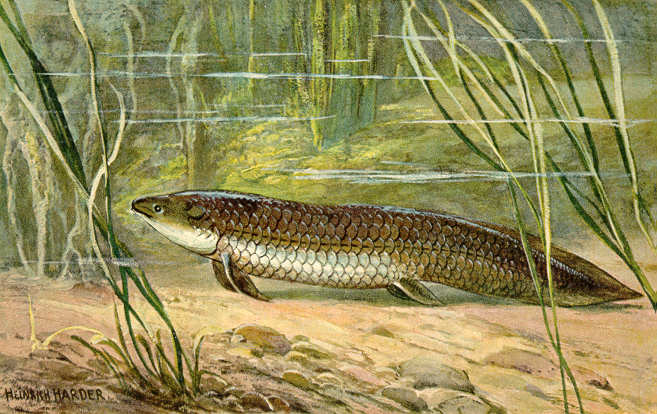
- Life restoration of the Late Triassic-Eocene lungfish Ceratodus
  †Ceratodus
  - †Ceratodus frazieri – or unidentified related form
- Cerithium
  - †Cerithium pilsbryi
  - †Cerithium weeksi – or unidentified related form
- †Chasmatosporites
  - †Chasmatosporites rimatus
- †Chedighaii
  - †Chedighaii barberi
- Cheilotrichia
  - †Cheilotrichia cretacea – type locality for species
- †Chelone
  - †Chelone sopita
- Chiloscyllium
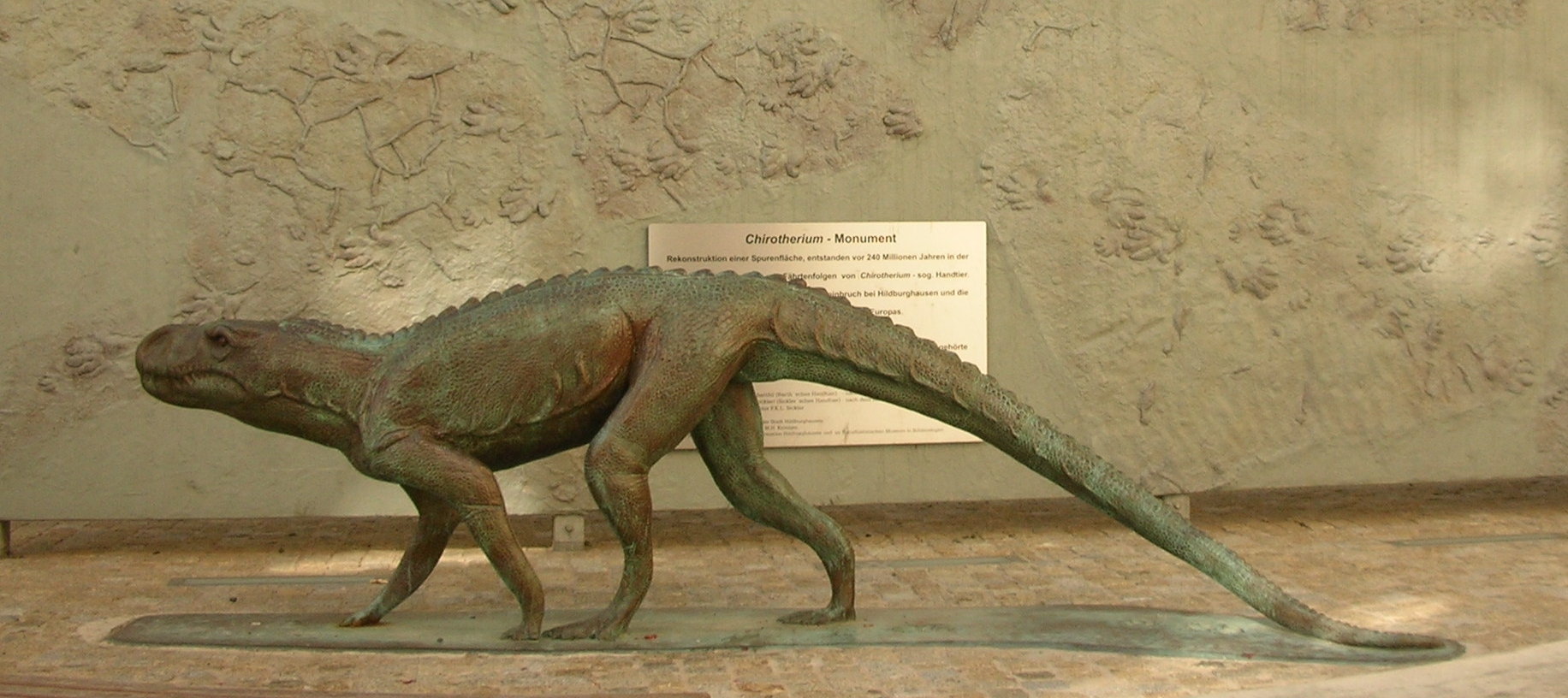
- Restorative model of the hypothetical trackmaker of the Late Triassic ichnogenus Chirotherium with real fossil footprints in the background
  †Chirotherium
  - †Chirotherium lulli – type locality for species
  - †Chirotherium parvum – type locality for species
- Chlamys
  - †Chlamys michellesmithi – type locality for species
  - †Chlamys whitfieldi
- †Chloranthistemon
  - †Chloranthistemon crossmanensis – type locality for species
- †Choriatothyris
  - †Choriatothyris plicata
- †Choristothyris
  - †Choristothyris plicata
  - †Choristothyris vanuxemi
- †Cicatricosisporites
  - †Cicatricosisporites goeppertii
  - †Cicatricosisporites intersectus
  - †Cicatricosisporites striosporites
  - †Cicatricosisporites verrucosus – type locality for species
- †Cidares
  - †Cidares armigera
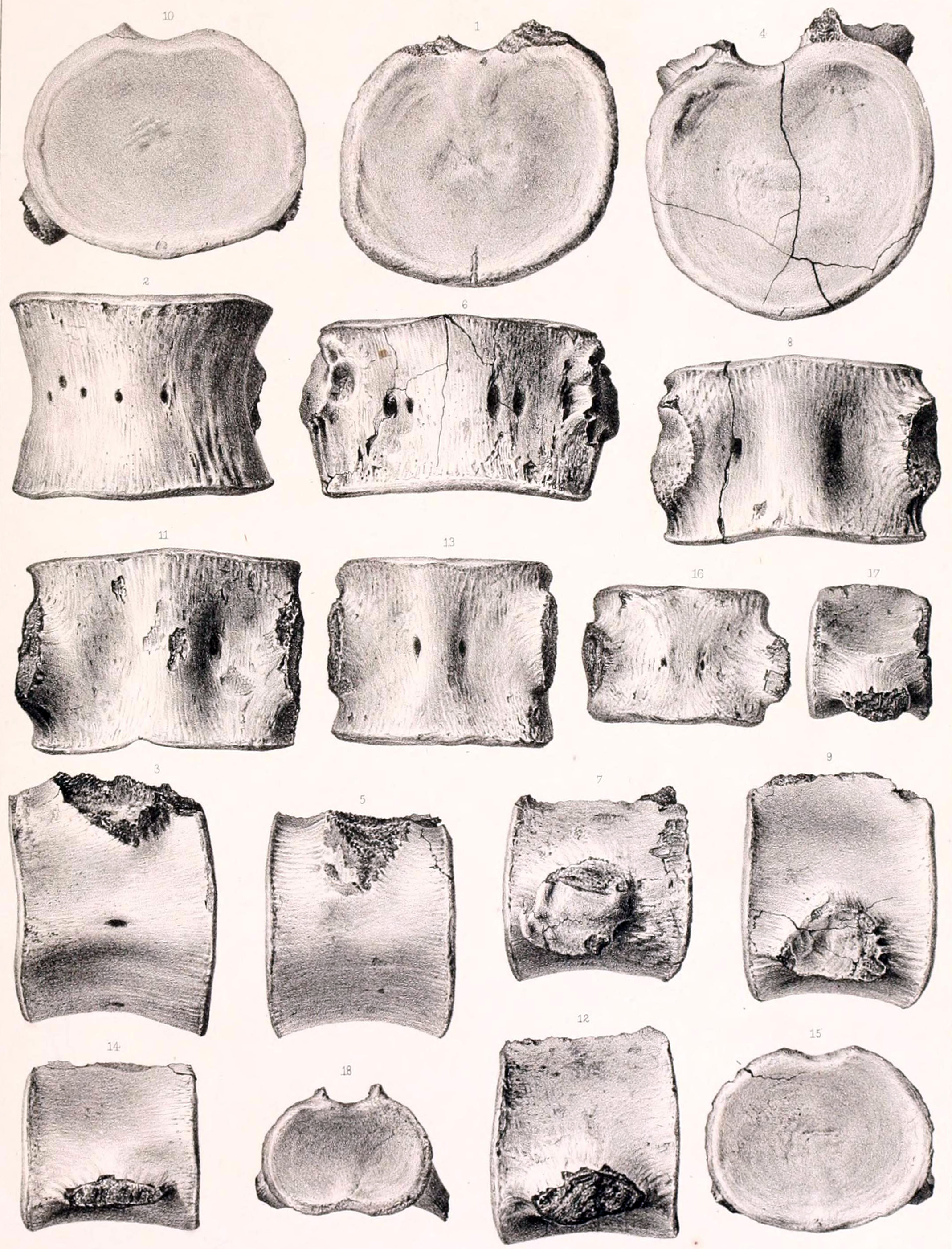
- Fossilized vertebrae in multiple views of the Cretaceous plesiosaur Cimoliasaurus
  †Cimoliasaurus
  - †Cimoliasaurus magnus
- †Cimolomys – or unidentified comparable form
  - †Cimolomys clarki
- †Cingulatisporites
  - †Cingulatisporites carinatus – type locality for species
  - †Cingulatisporites exiniconfertus – type locality for species
  - †Cingulatisporites problematicus
  - †Cingulatisporites pyriformis – type locality for species
- †Cirroceras
  - †Cirroceras conradi
- †Clathropteris
  - †Clathropteris meniscoides
- Clavagella
  - †Clavagella armata
- †Clavatipollenites
  - †Clavatipollenites couperi
  - †Clavatipollenites hughesii
- †Clavipholas
  - †Clavipholas pectorosa
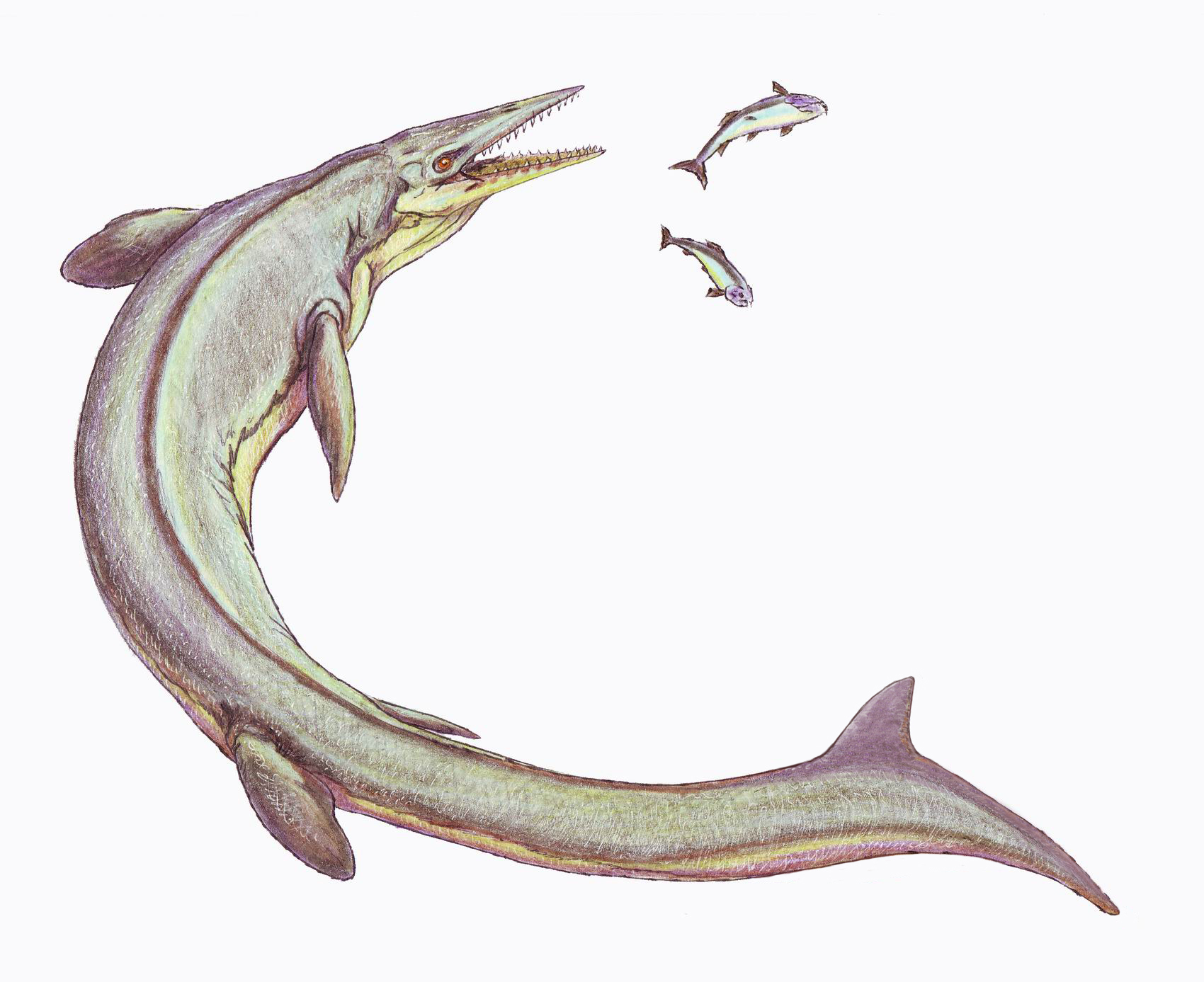
- Life restoration of the Late Cretaceous mosasaurid Clidastes
  †Clidastes
  - †Clidastes iguanavus – type locality for species
- Cliona
  - †Cliona aretacica
  - †Cliona cretacea
  - †Cliona cretacica
  - †Cliona microtuberum
  - †Cliona microtuberus
- †Clionia
  - †Clionia cretacica
- †Clisocolus
  - †Clisocolus umbonata
- †Cloranthistemon
  - †Cloranthistemon crossmanensis
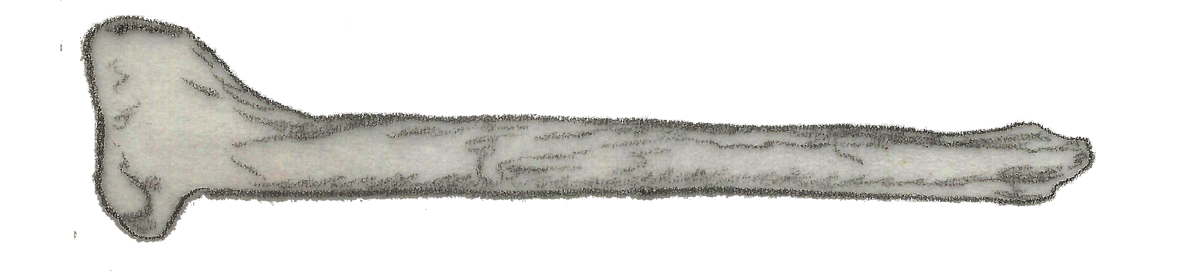
- Illustration of a fossilized tibia of the Late Cretaceous theropod dinosaur Coelosaurus antiquus
  †Coelosaurus
  - †Coelosaurus antiquus – type locality for species
- †Coelurosaurichnus
- Concavisporites
  - †Concavisporites granulatus – type locality for species
  - †Concavisporites orbicornutus – type locality for species
  - †Concavisporites tricornutus – type locality for species
- †Conclavipollis
  - †Conclavipollis densilatus – type locality for species
- †Conosaurops
  - †Conosaurops bowmani
- †Contogenys – tentative report
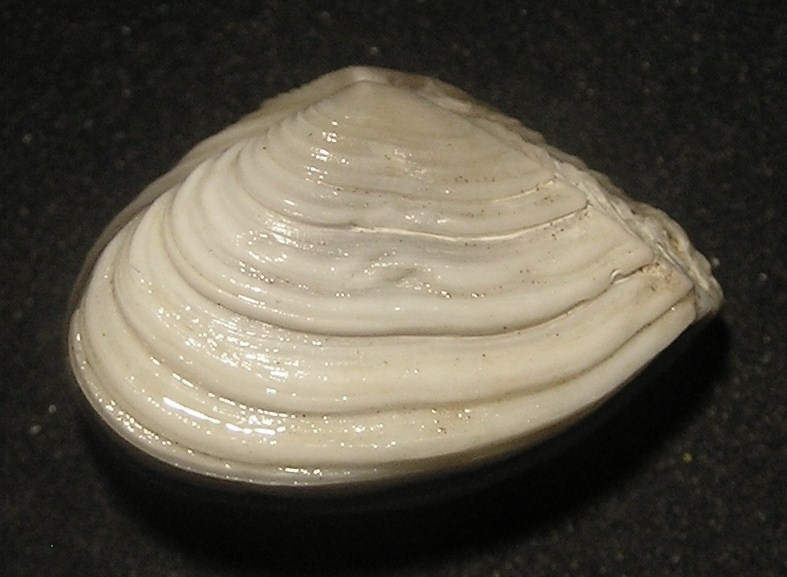
- Shell of a Corbula basket clam
  Corbula
  - †Corbula crassiplicata
  - †Corbula emacerata
  - †Corbula foulkei
  - †Corbula greywaczi
  - †Corbula manleyi
  - †Corbula manleyi duplex
  - †Corbula subcompressa
  - †Corbula swedesboroensis
- †Corsochelys
- Crassatella
  - †Crassatella lintea
  - †Crassatella transversus
  - †Crassatella vadosa
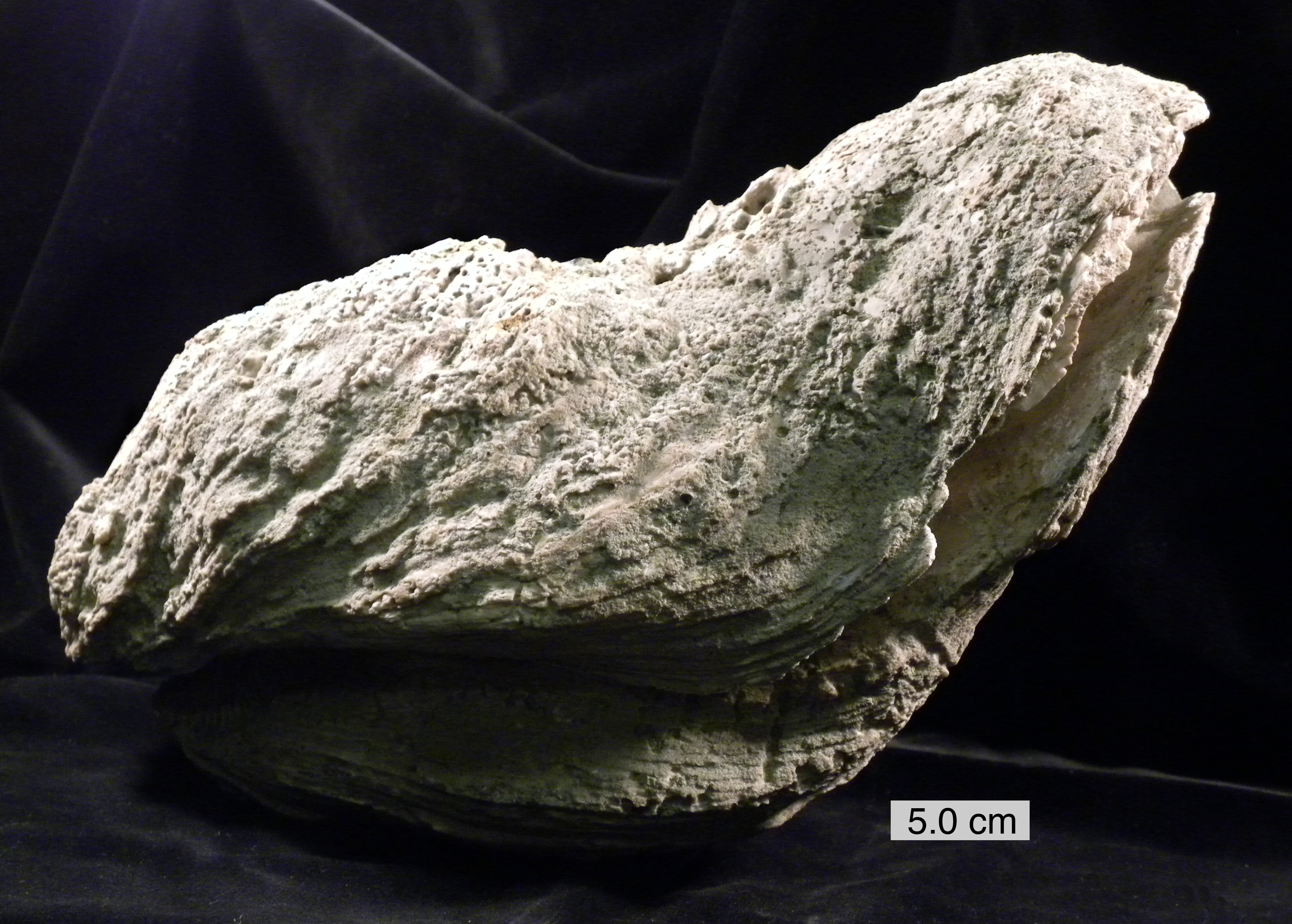
- Fossilized shell of the Cretaceous-modern oyster Crassostrea
  Crassostrea
  - †Crassostrea tecticosta
- †Cratotabanus
  - †Cratotabanus newjerseyensis – type locality for species
- †Crenella
  - †Crenella elegantula
  - †Crenella serica
- †Cretagaster – type locality for genus
  - †Cretagaster raritanensis – type locality for species
- †Cretocar – type locality for genus
  - †Cretocar luzzii – type locality for species
- †Cretocoranina
- †Cretodus
  - †Cretodus arcuata
  - †Cretodus borodini
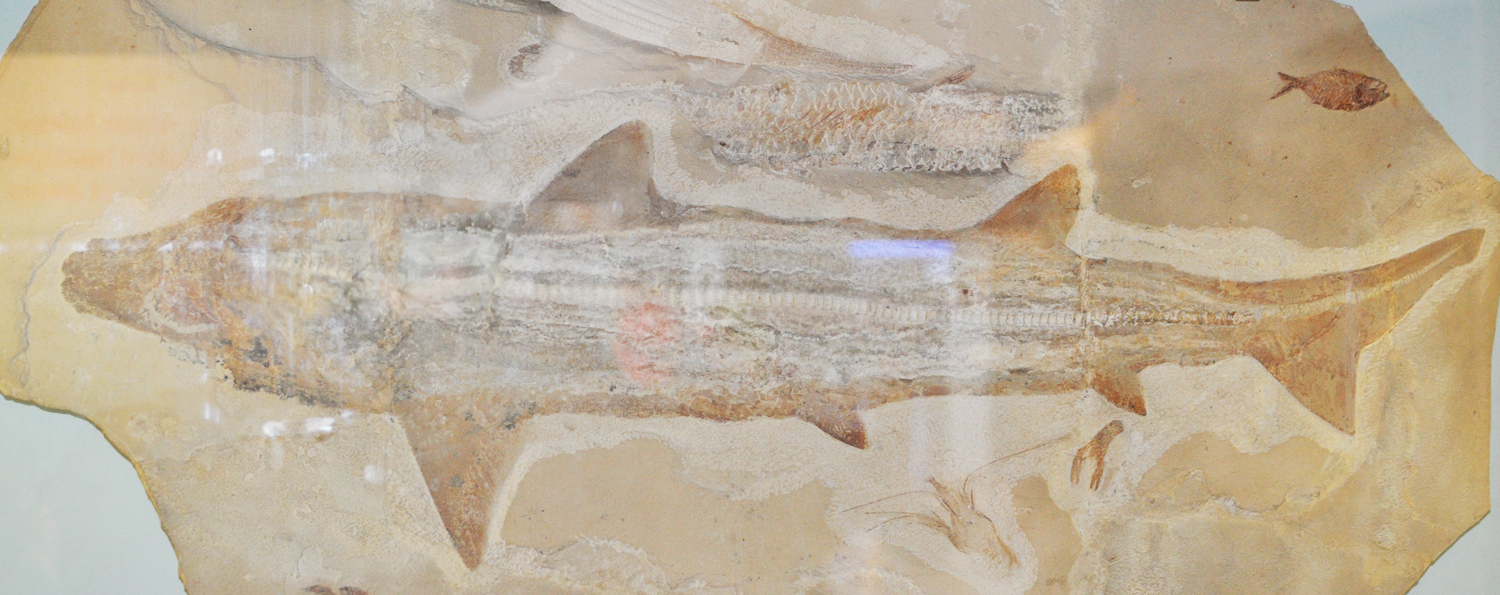
- Fossil of the Early Cretaceous-Eocene shark Cretolamna
  †Cretolamna
  - †Cretolamna appendiculata
  - †Cretolamna arcuata
- †Cretomicrophorus
  - †Cretomicrophorus novemundus – type locality for species
- †Cretomitarcys – type locality for genus
  - †Cretomitarcys luzzii – type locality for species
- †Cretothrips – type locality for genus
  - †Cretothrips antiquus – type locality for species
- †Cretotrigona
  - †Cretotrigona prisca – type locality for species
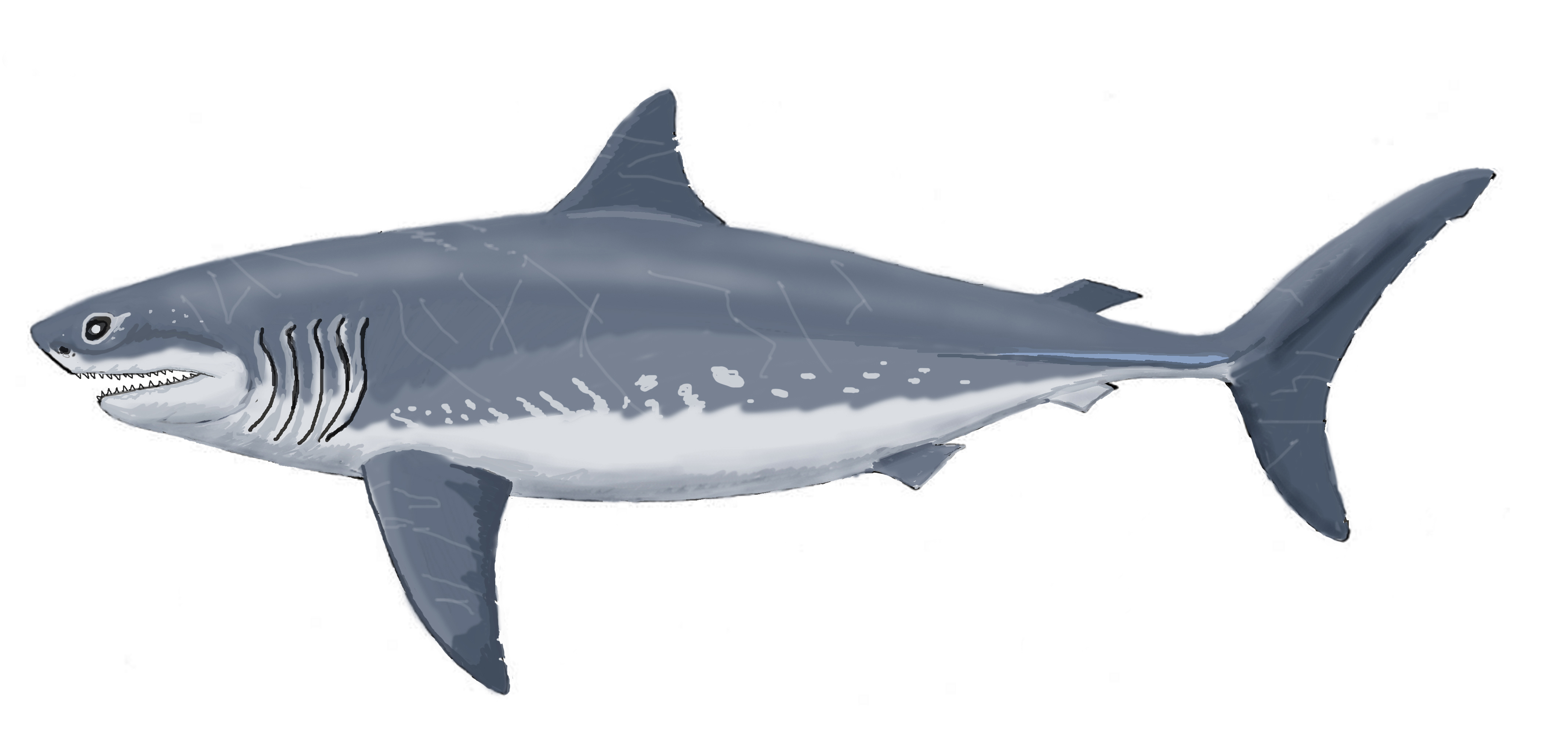
- Restoration of the Late Cretaceous shark Cretoxyrhina, or the Ginsu shark
  †Cretoxyrhina
  - †Cretoxyrhina mantelli
- †Crocodilus
  - †Crocodilus obscurus – type locality for species
- †Cronquistiflora
  - †Cronquistiflora sayrevillensis
- Ctena
  - †Ctena parvilineata
- Ctenoides
  - †Ctenoides crenulicostata
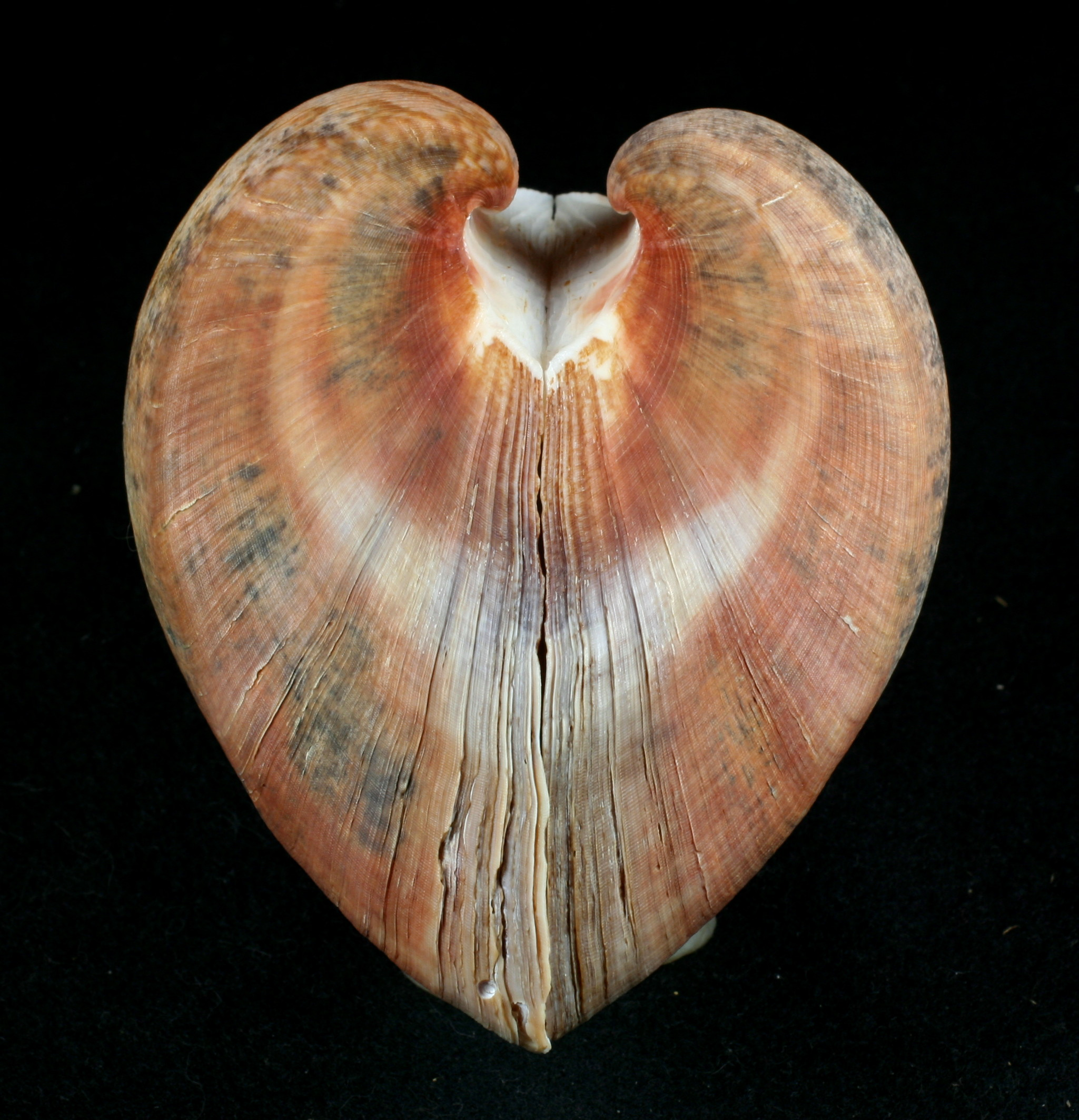
- Shell of a Cucullaea, or false ark shell
  Cucullaea
  - †Cucullaea antroea
  - †Cucullaea antrosa
  - †Cucullaea capax
  - †Cucullaea littlei
  - †Cucullaea neglecta
  - †Cucullaea vulgaris
- Culicoides
  - †Culicoides bifidus – type locality for species
  - †Culicoides casei
  - †Culicoides filipalpis
  - †Culicoides grandibocus – type locality for species
  - †Culicoides truncatus – type locality for species
  - †Culicoides yoosti – type locality for species
- †Cuna
  - †Cuna texana
- †Cuneocorbula – tentative report
  - †Cuneocorbula whitfieldi
- Cuspidaria
  - †Cuspidaria jerseyensis
  - †Cuspidaria ventricosa
- †Cyathidites
  - †Cyathidites australis
  - †Cyathidites minor
- †Cycadopites
  - †Cycadopites folicularis – or unidentified comparable form
- †Cylindracanthus
  - †Cylindracanthus rectus
- †Cymbophora
  - †Cymbophora appressa
  - †Cymbophora berryi
  - †Cymbophora lintea
  - †Cymbophora wordeni
- †Cymella
  - †Cymella bella
  - †Cymella bellatexana
- †Cyprimeria
  - †Cyprimeria densata
  - †Cyprimeria excavata
- †Cyrodes
- Cyzicus – or unidentified comparable form

== D ==
- †Dacrycarpites
  - †Dacrycarpites dacrydioides
- Dasyatis
  - †Dasyatis newegyptensis – type locality for species
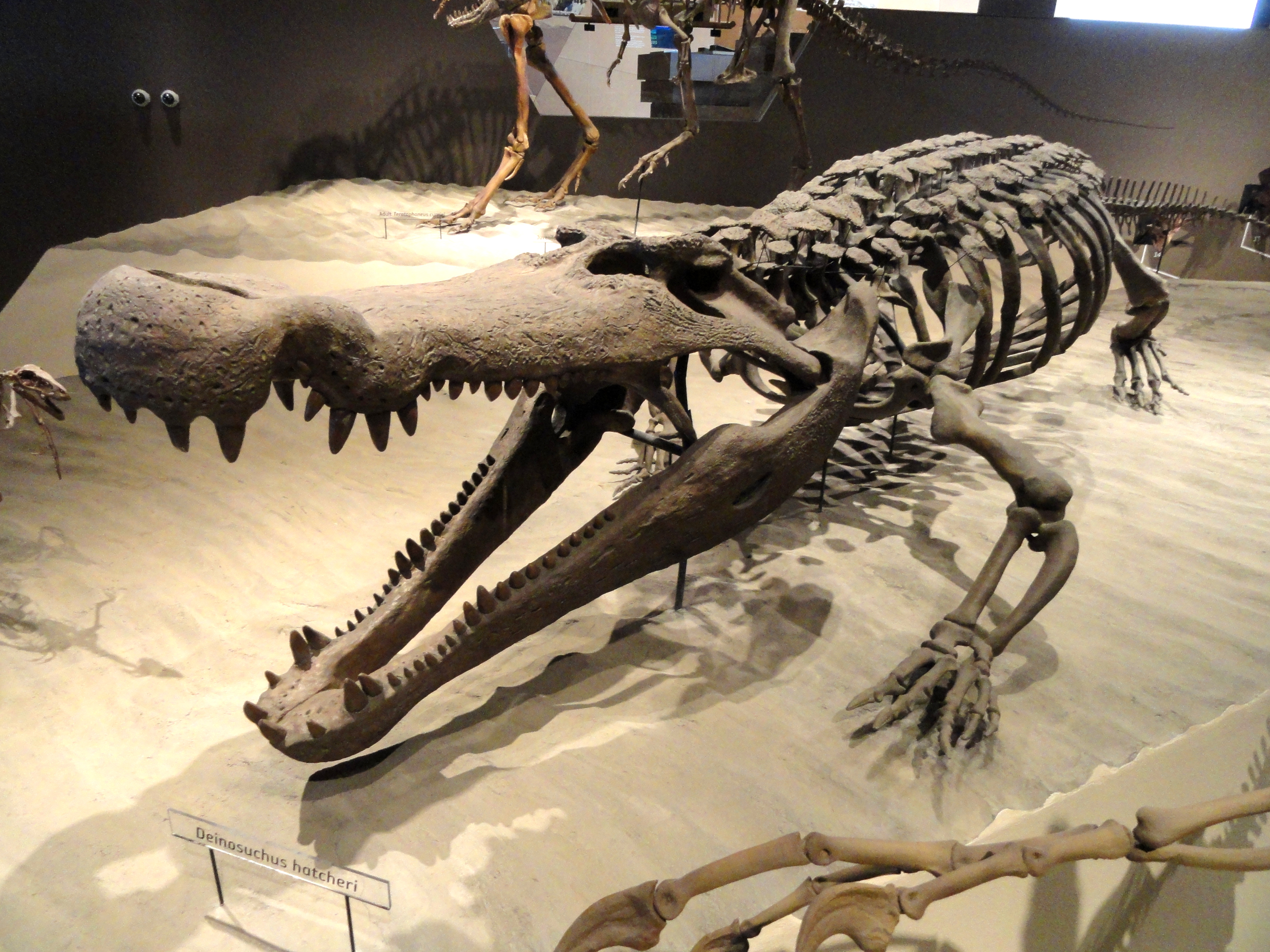
- Mounted fossilized skeleton of the Late Cretaceous Alligator relative Deinosuchus
  †Deinosuchus
  - †Deinosuchus rugosus
- †Deltoidospora
  - †Deltoidospora incomposita – type locality for species
- †Densoisporites
  - †Densoisporites perinatus
- †Dentalium
  - †Dentalium enfaulensis
  - †Dentalium leve
  - †Dentalium subarcuatum
- †Detrusandra
  - †Detrusandra mystagoga
- †Dhondtichlamys
  - †Dhondtichlamys venustus
- †Dianchora
  - †Dianchora echinata
- †Dictyophyllidites
  - †Dictyophyllidites harrisii
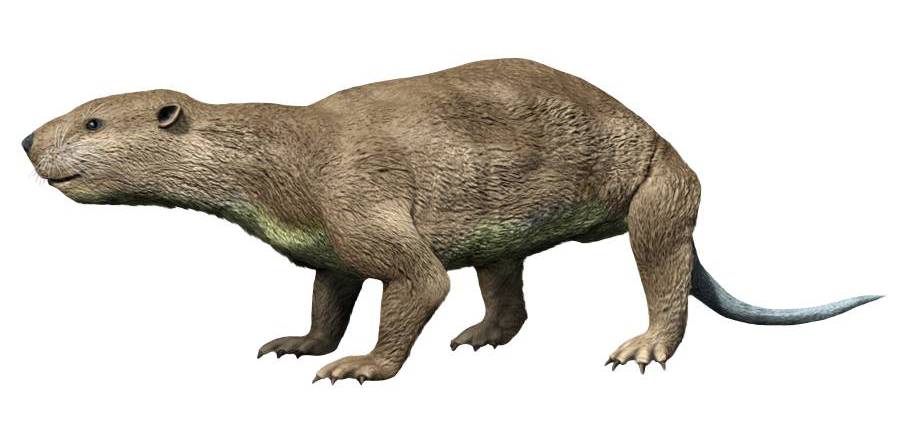
- Life restoration of the Late Cretaceous marsupial relative Didelphodon
  †Didelphodon – or unidentified comparable form
- †Didymoceras
  - †Didymoceras draconis – or unidentified comparable form
- †Diploconcha
  - †Diploconcha cretacea
- †Diplocynodon
- †Diplurus – or unidentified comparable form
  - †Diplurus longicaudatus
- †Dipristis
  - †Dipristis meirsii – type locality for species
- †Discisporites
  - †Discisporites discoides – type locality for species
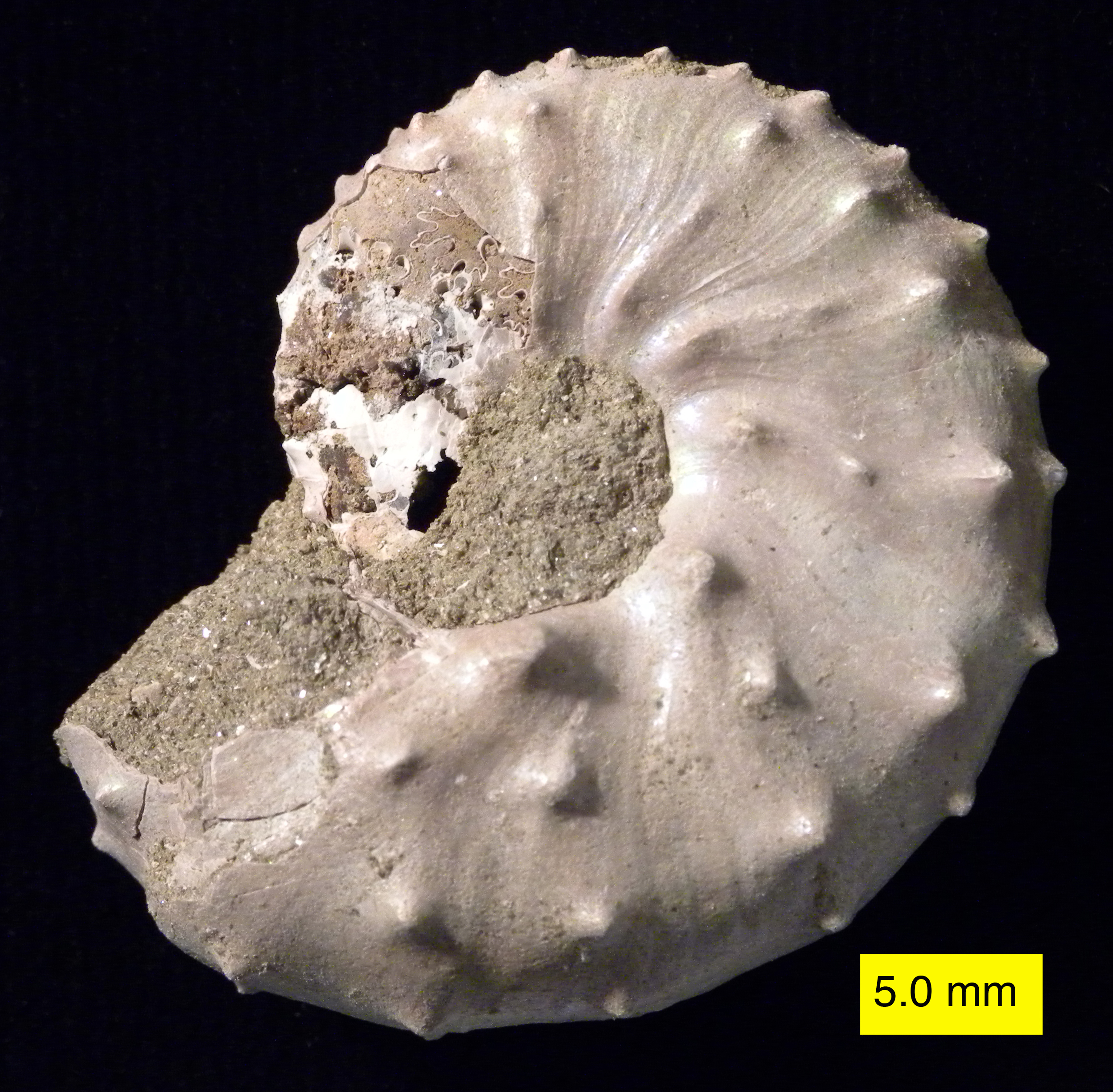
- Fossilized shell of the Late Cretaceous ammonoid cephalopod Discoscaphites
  †Discoscaphites
  - †Discoscaphites conradi
  - †Discoscaphites gulosus
- †Dithophaga
  - †Dithophaga carolinensis
- Dohrniphora
- †Dolicholatirus
- Dosinia
  - †Dosinia depressa
  - †Dosinia haddonfieldensis
- †Drilluta
  - †Drilluta buboanus – or unidentified comparable form
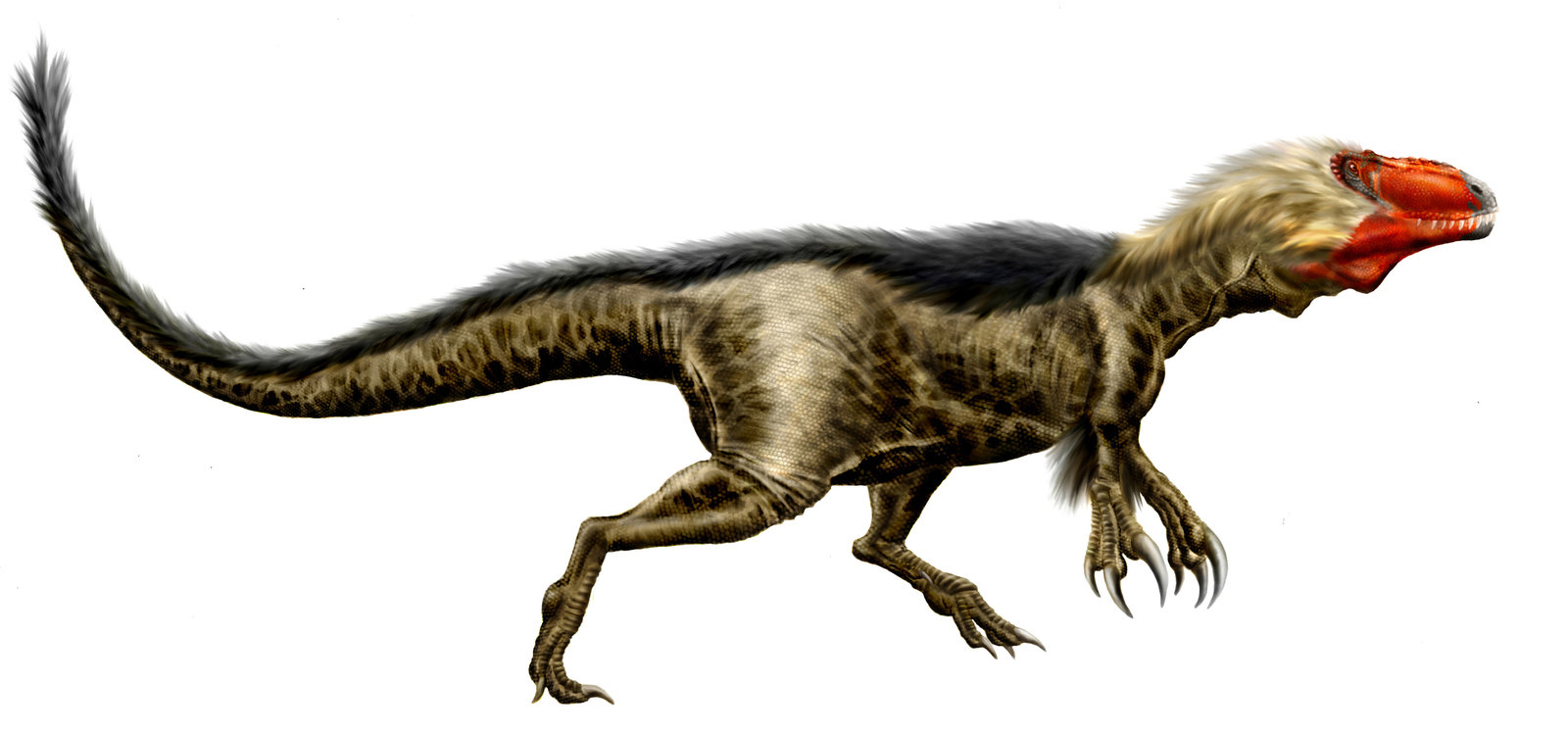
- Life restoration of the Late Cretaceous primitive tyrannosaur Dryptosaurus
  †Dryptosaurus – type locality for genus
  - †Dryptosaurus aquilunguis – type locality for species
- †Dziedzickia
  - †Dziedzickia nashi – type locality for species

== E ==
- †Echodus
  - †Echodus ferox
- †Ectrepesthoneura
  - †Ectrepesthoneura swolenskyi – type locality for species
- †Edaphadon
  - †Edaphadon mirificus
- Edaphodon
  - †Edaphodon mirificus
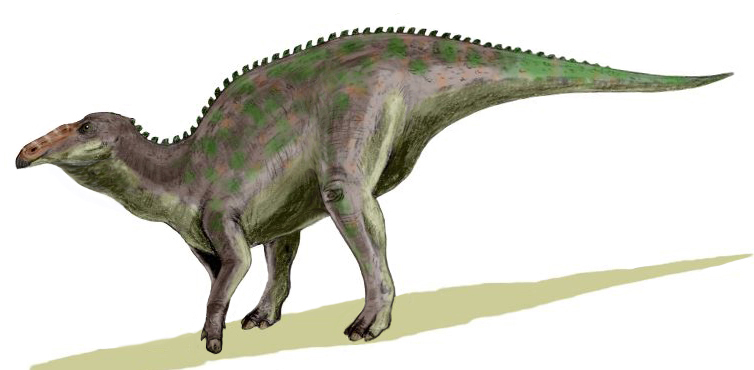
- Restoration of the Late Cretaceous duck-billed dinosaur Edmontosaurus annectens
  †Edmontosaurus
  - †Edmontosaurus minor
- †Elasmophron – type locality for genus
  - †Elasmophron kurthi – type locality for species
- †Elasmosaurus
  - †Elasmosaurus orientalis – type locality for species
- †Electrobaissa – type locality for genus
  - †Electrobaissa omega – type locality for species
- †Electrosania – type locality for genus
  - †Electrosania cretica – type locality for species
- †Ellipsoscapha
  - †Ellipsoscapha mortoni
- †Emplita – type locality for genus
  - †Emplita casei – type locality for species
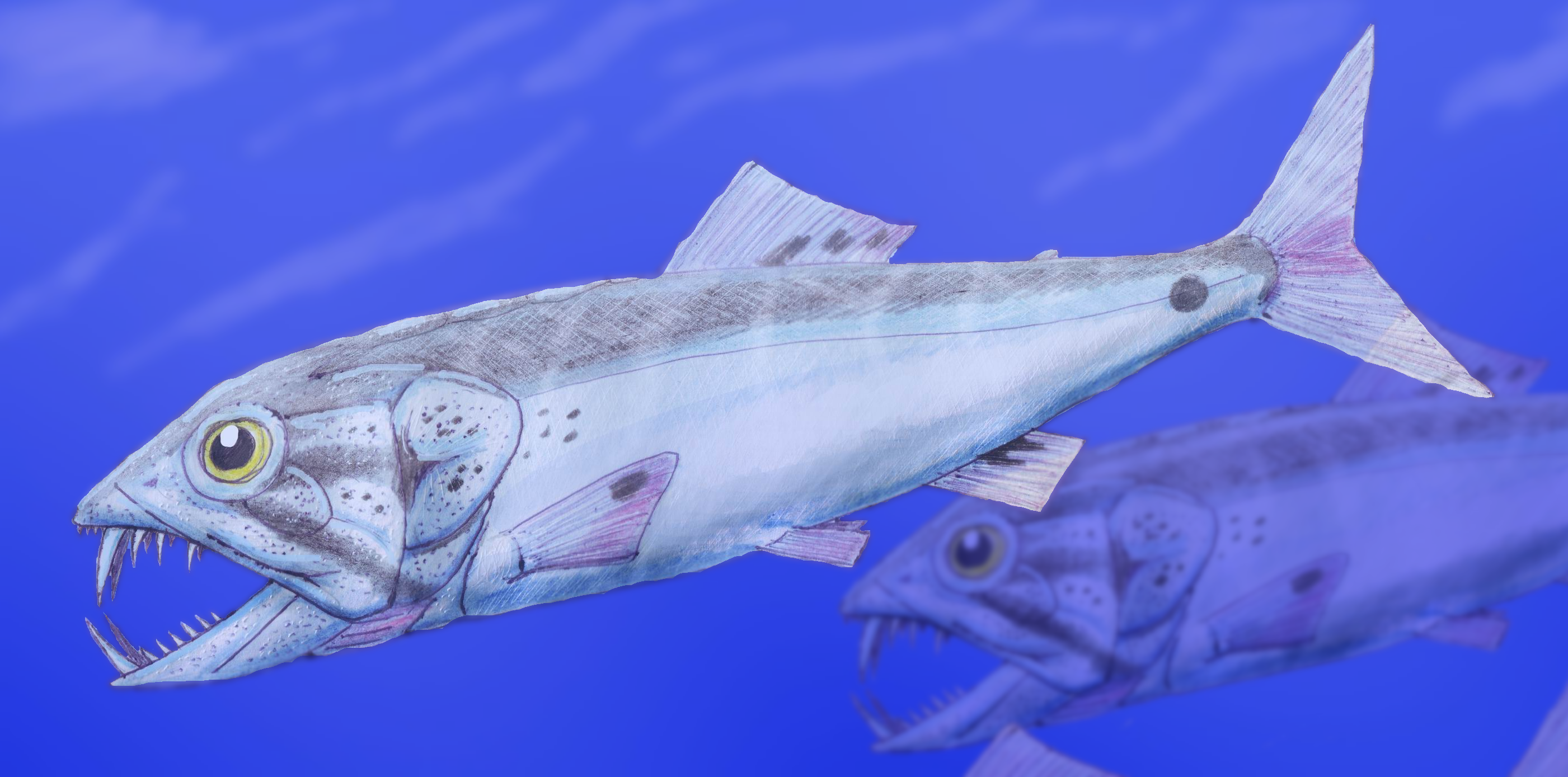
- Restoration of the Early Cretaceous-Eocene bony fish Enchodus, or the "saber-toothed herring"
  †Enchodus
  - †Enchodus ferox
  - †Enchodus gladiolus
- †Endoptygma
  - †Endoptygma leprosa
- †Eomatsucoccus
  - †Eomatsucoccus casei – type locality for species
- Eonavicula
  - †Eonavicula rostellata
- †Epitonium
  - †Epitonium sillimani
- †Erquelinnesia
  - †Erquelinnesia molaria – type locality for species
- †Etea
- †Eubaculites
  - †Eubaculites carinatus
  - †Eubaculites labyrinthicus – or unidentified comparable form
- †Eufistulana
  - †Eufistulana whitfieldi
- †Euspira
  - †Euspira halli
  - †Euspira rectilabrum
- †Eutrephoceras
  - †Eutrephoceras dekayi
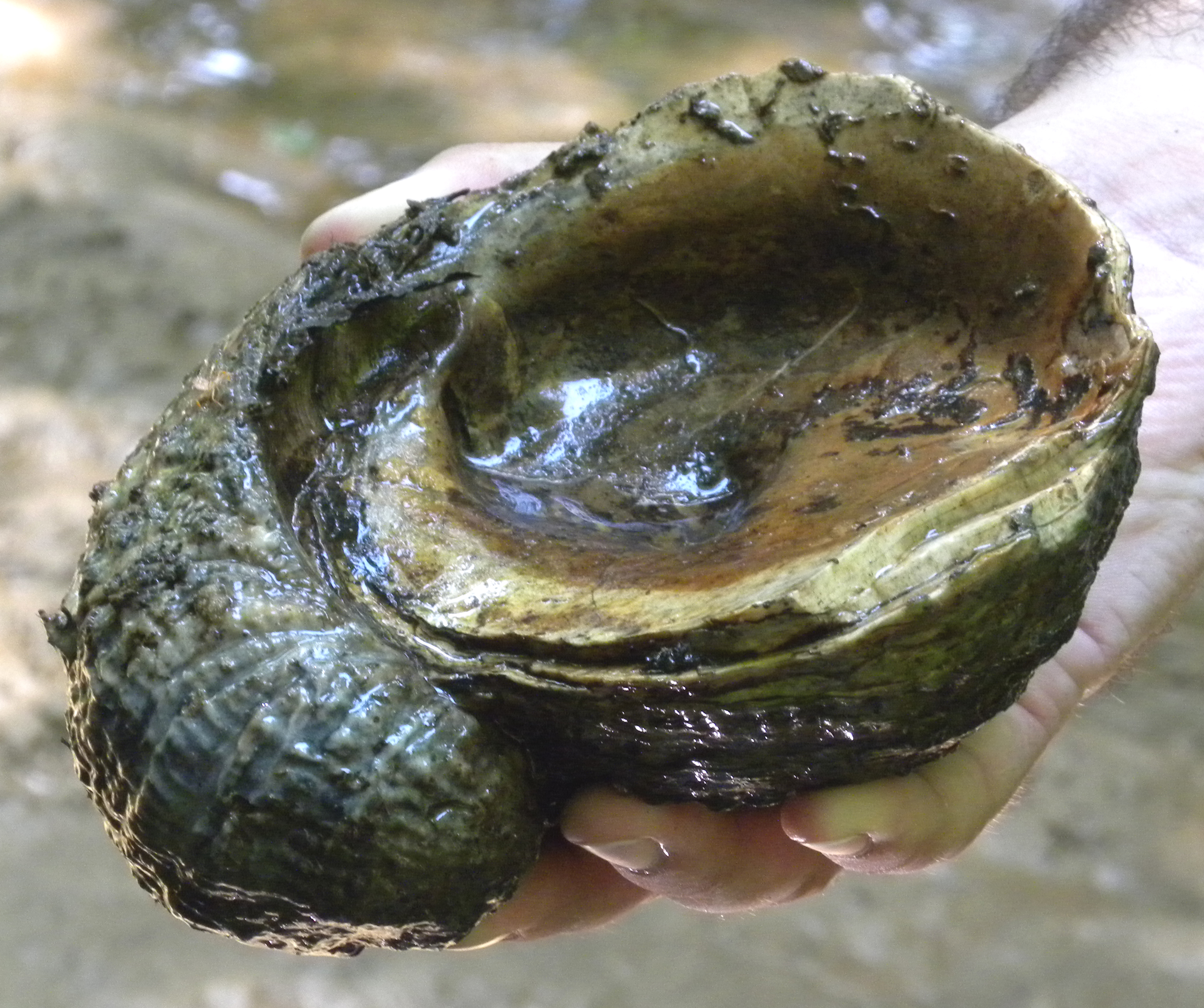
- Interior of a fossilized shell of the Jurassic-Cretaceous foam oyster Exogyra
  †Exogyra
  - †Exogyra cancellata
  - †Exogyra costata
  - †Exogyra ponderosa
- †Eydeia
  - †Eydeia jerseyensis – type locality for species

== F ==
- Fasciolaria

== G ==
- †Gegania
- †Gervilia
  - †Gervilia ensiformis
- †Gervillia
  - †Gervillia minima
- †Gervilliopsis
  - †Gervilliopsis ensiformis
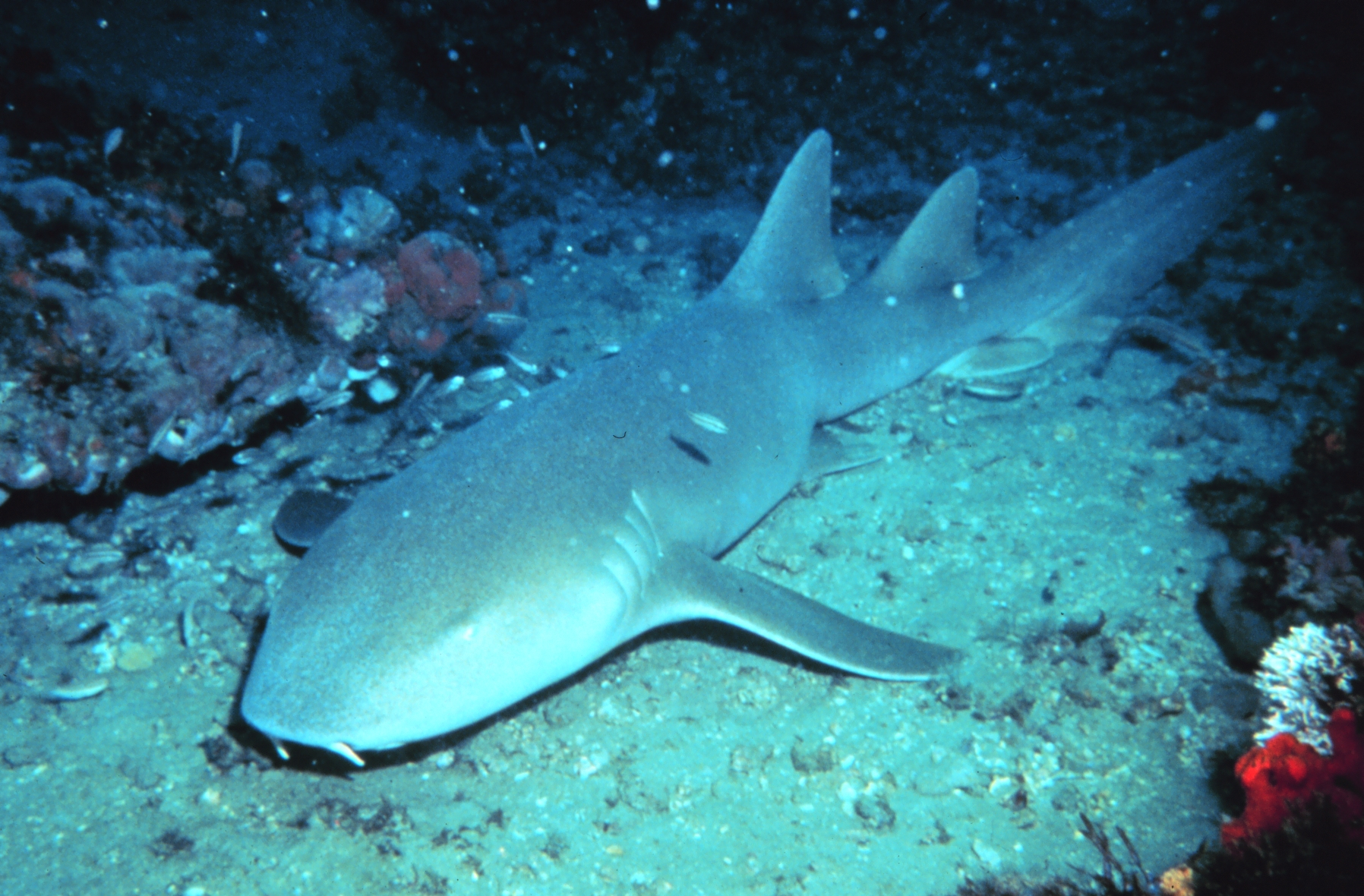
- A living Ginglymostoma nurse shark
  Ginglymostoma
  - †Ginglymostoma cuspidata – type locality for species
  - †Ginglymostoma globidens
- †Glaesoconis
  - †Glaesoconis nearctica – type locality for species
- †Gleicheniidites
  - †Gleicheniidites orientalis
  - †Gleicheniidites raritanianus – type locality for species
  - †Gleicheniidites senonicus
- Glossus
- Glycimeris
  - †Glycimeris mortoni
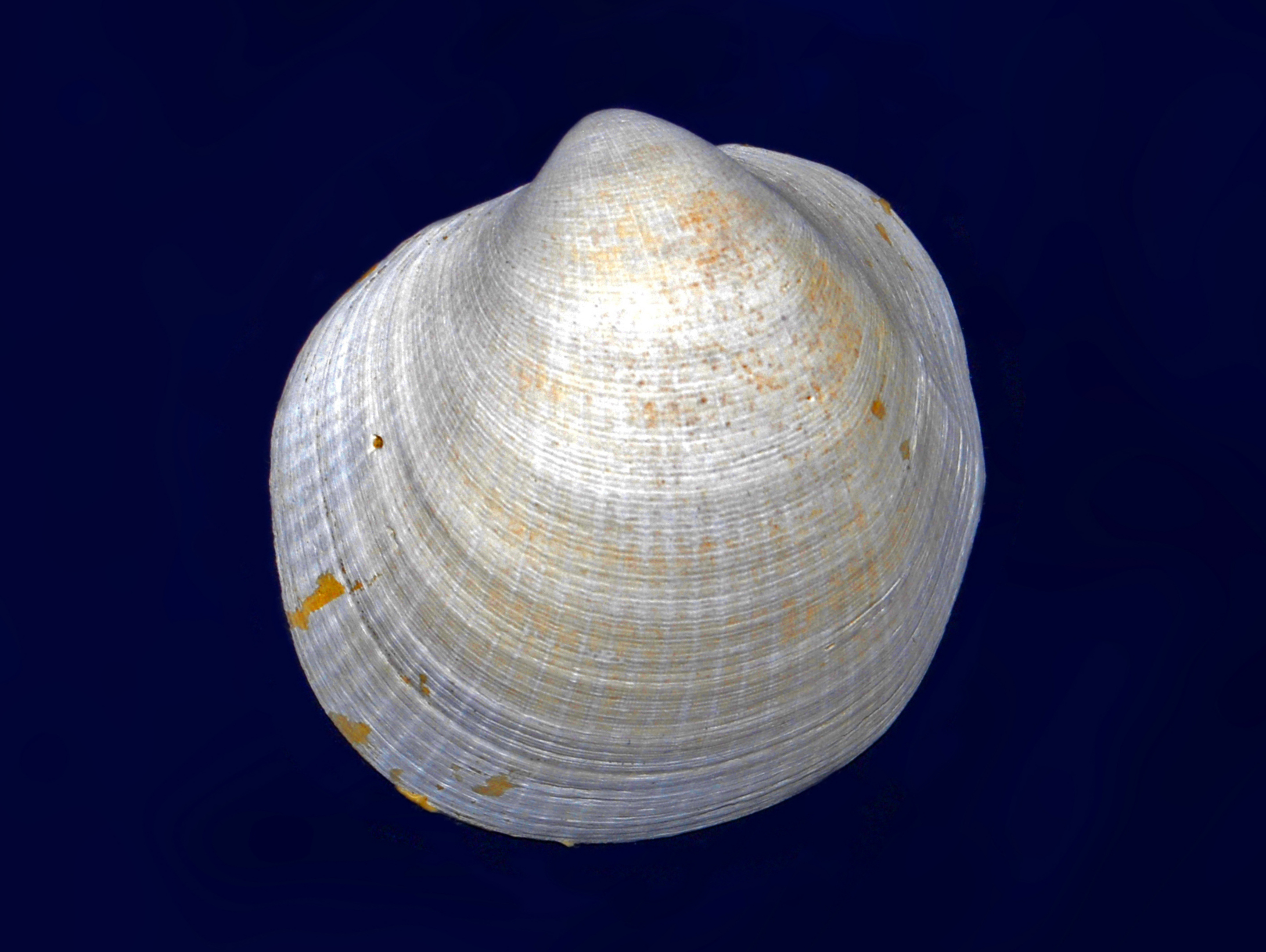
- Fossilized shell of a Glycymeris, or bittersweet clam
  Glycymeris
  - †Glycymeris compressa
  - †Glycymeris mortoni
  - †Glycymeris rotundata
- †Glyptoxoceras
  - †Glyptoxoceras aquisgranense
- †Gonyaulax
  - †Gonyaulax pachyderma – or unidentified comparable form
  - †Gonyaulax wetzeli – or unidentified comparable form
- †Graculavus – type locality for genus
  - †Graculavus pumilis – type locality for species
  - †Graculavus velox – type locality for species
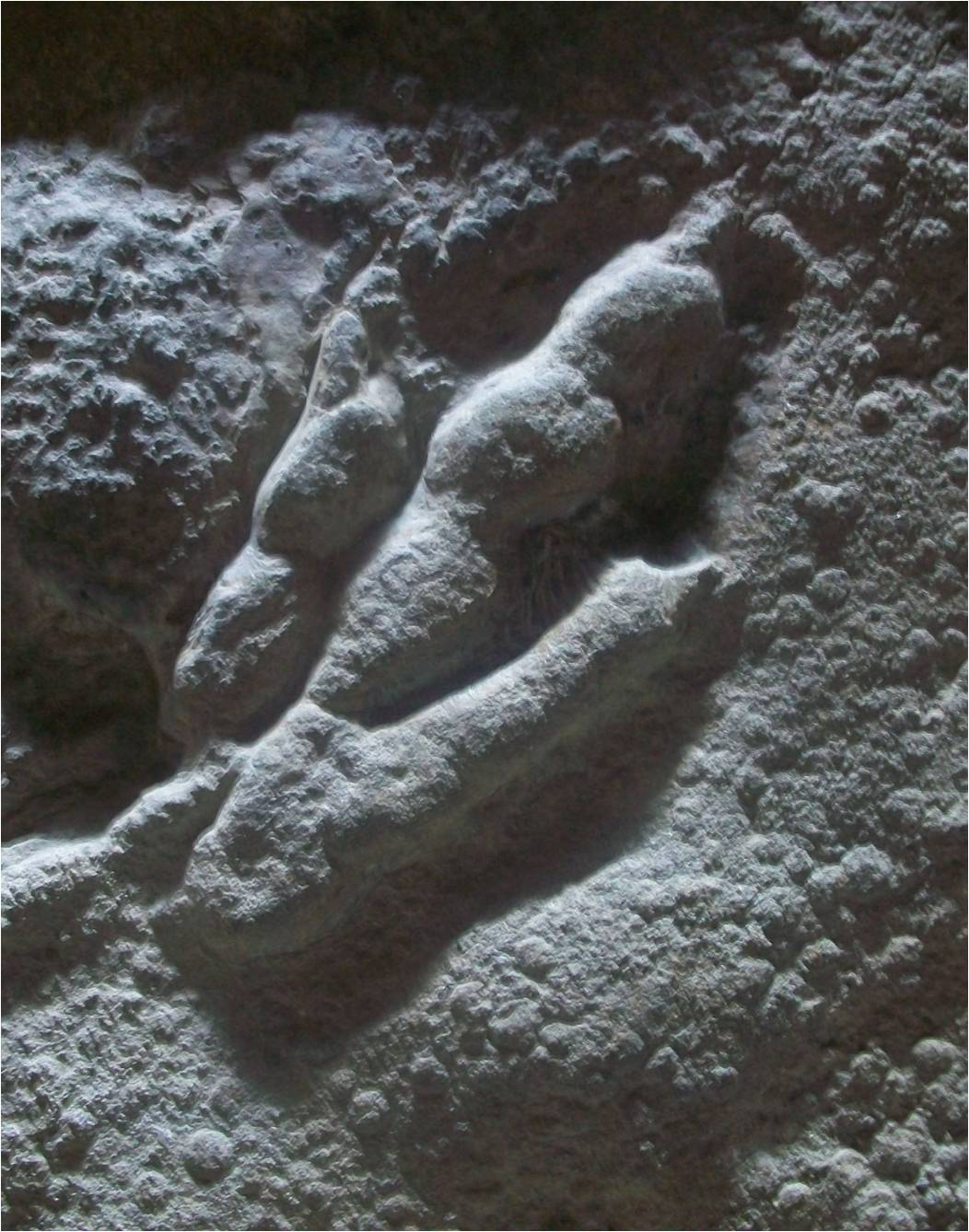
- Fossil negative with skin impressions of the theropod dinosaur footprint ichnogenus Grallator
  †Grallator
  - †Grallator cursorius
  - †Grallator formosus
  - †Grallator parallelus
  - †Grallator sulcatus – type locality for species
- †Granocardium
  - †Granocardium dumosum
  - †Granocardium kuemmeli
  - †Granocardium kummeli
  - †Granocardium tenuistriatum
  - †Granocardium trilineatum
- †Gregikia – type locality for genus
  - †Gregikia pallida – type locality for species
- †Grimaldiella – type locality for genus
  - †Grimaldiella gregaria – type locality for species
  - †Grimaldiella resinophila – type locality for species
- †Grimaldiraphidia
  - †Grimaldiraphidia luzzii – type locality for species
- †Grimaldivania – type locality for genus
  - †Grimaldivania ackermani – type locality for species
  - †Grimaldivania mckimorum – type locality for species
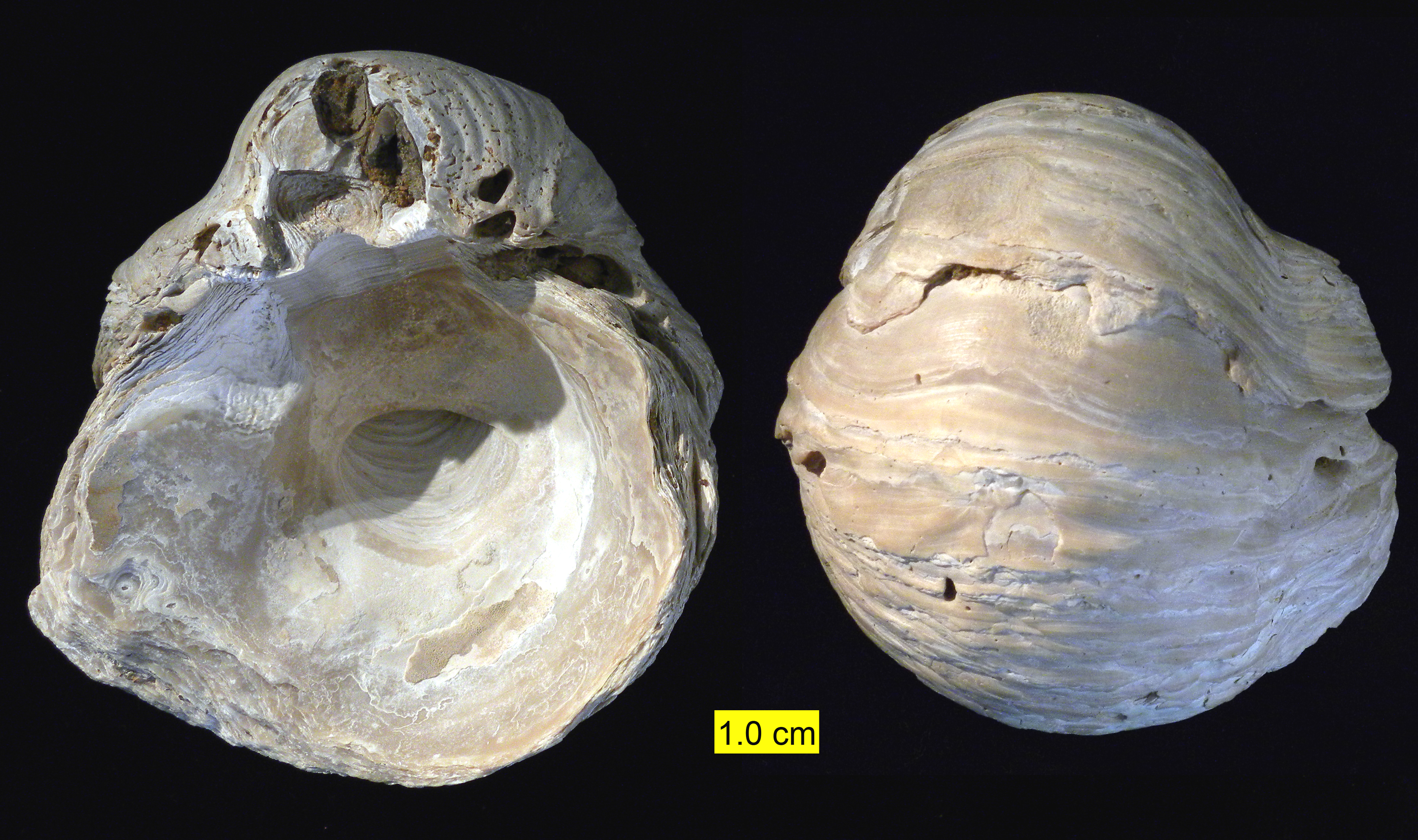
- Interior and exterior of a fossilized shell of the Late Triassic-Eocene marine bivalve Gryphaea
  †Gryphaea
  - †Gryphaea convexa
  - †Gryphaea mutabilis
- †Gryphaeostrea
  - †Gryphaeostrea vomer
- †Gwyneddichnium
  - †Gwyneddichnium majore
  - †Gwyneddichnium minor
- Gyrodes
  - †Gyrodes abyssinus
  - †Gyrodes petrosus
  - †Gyrodes supraplicatus

== H ==
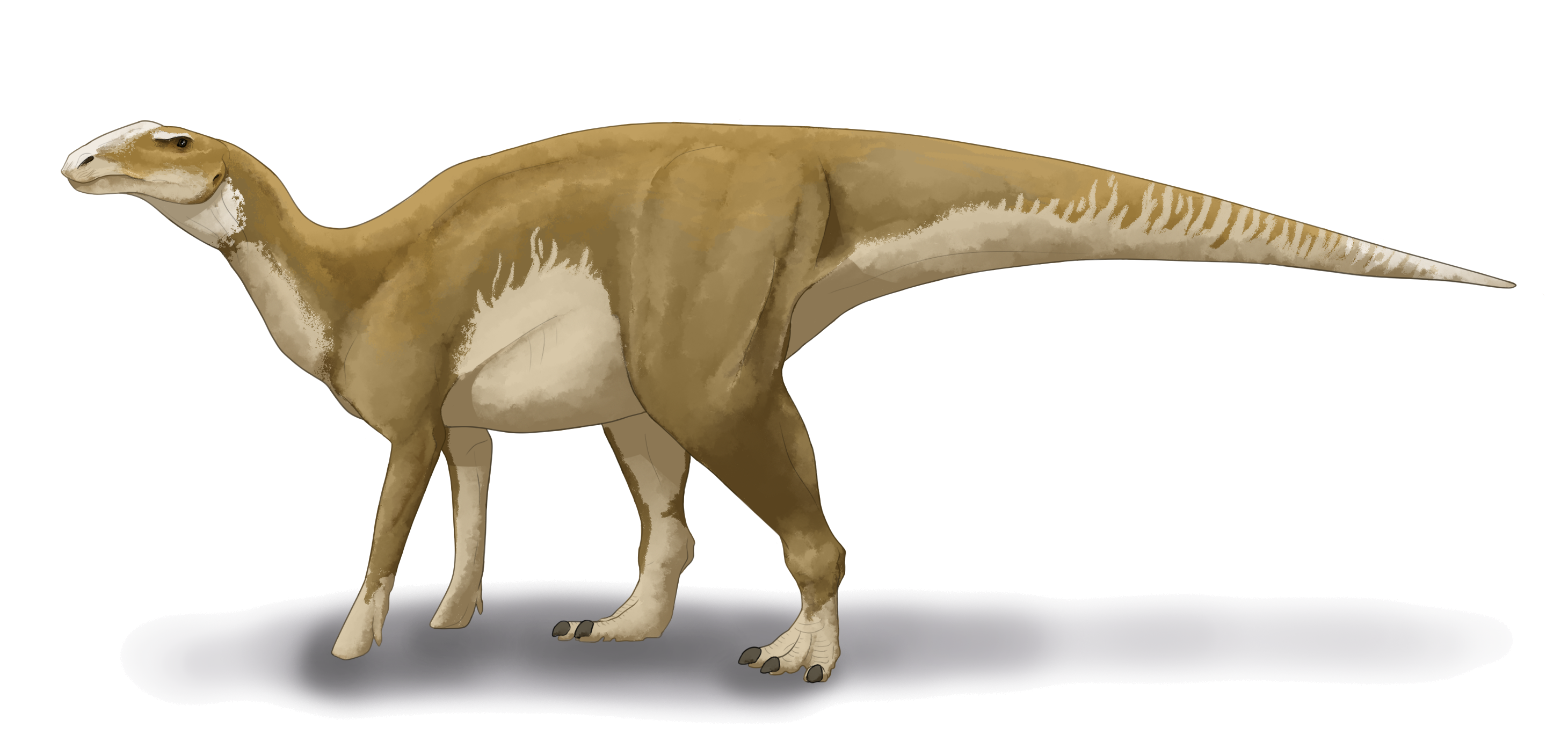
- Life restoration of the Late Cretaceous dinosaur Hadrosaurus
  †Hadrosaurus – type locality for genus
  - †Hadrosaurus cavatus – type locality for species
  - †Hadrosaurus foulkii – type locality for species
  - †Hadrosaurus minor – type locality for species
- †Halisaurus
  - †Halisaurus platyspondylus
- †Hamule
  - †Hamule falcatus
  - †Hamule squamosus
- †Haptosphenus – or unidentified comparable form
- †Hardouinea
  - †Hardouinea mortonisemmonsi
- †Harpagopus
  - †Harpagopus dubius
- †Heleageron
  - †Heleageron grimaldii – type locality for species
- Hemiaster
  - †Hemiaster kuemmeli
  - †Hemiaster welleri
- Hemiscyllium
- †Henopelecinus – type locality for genus
  - †Henopelecinus pygmaeus – type locality for species
- †Hercorhynchus
- †Hercorhyncus
  - †Hercorhyncus pagodaformis
- †Herpystezoum
  - †Herpystezoum magnus
  - †Herpystezoum marshi
  - †Herpystezoum minutus
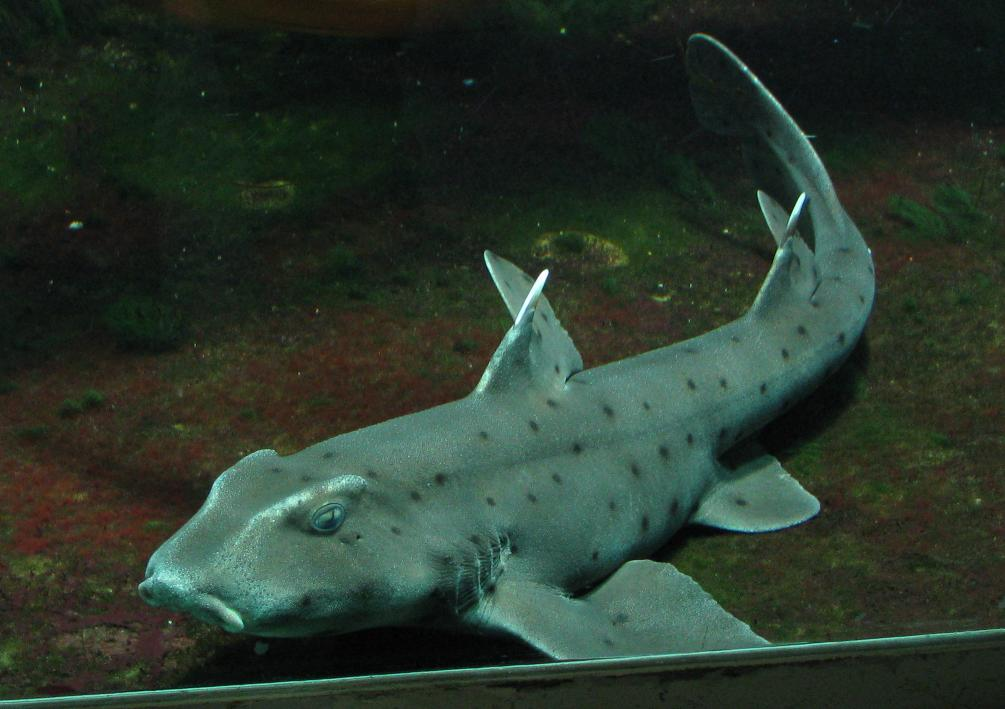
- A living Heterodontus, or bullhead shark
  Heterodontus
  - †Heterodontus creamridgensis – type locality for species
- †Hilarimorphites – type locality for genus
  - †Hilarimorphites longimedia – type locality for species
  - †Hilarimorphites setosa – type locality for species
  - †Hilarimorphites superba – type locality for species
  - †Hilarimorphites yeatesi – type locality for species
- †Homorophus – type locality for genus
  - †Homorophus insuetus – type locality for species
- †Hoploparia
  - †Hoploparia gabbi
  - †Hoploparia gladiator
- †Hoploscaphites
  - †Hoploscaphites pumilus
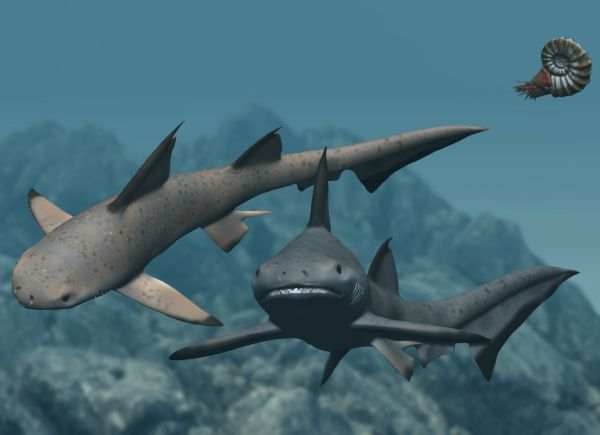
- Restoration of two of the Permian-Late Cretaceous cartilaginous fish Hybodus
  †Hybodus
- †Hyposaurus
  - †Hyposaurus rogersii – type locality for species
- †Hypotodus
  - †Hypotodus aculeatus
- †Hypoxytoma
  - †Hypoxytoma abrupta
- †Hypsibema
  - †Hypsibema crassicauda
- †Hypsognathus – type locality for genus
  - †Hypsognathus fenneri – type locality for species
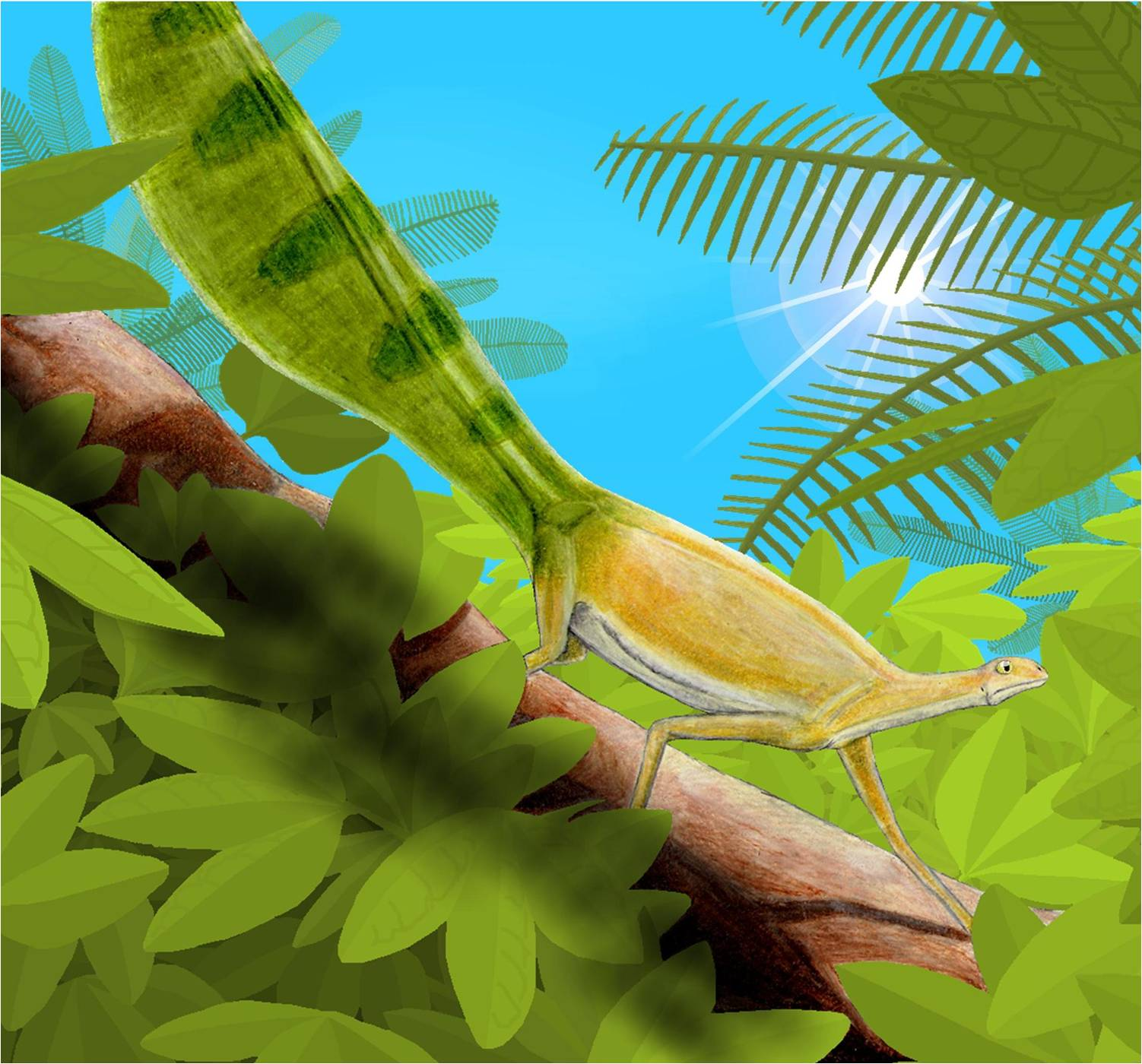
- Life restoration of the Late Triassic drepanosaur Hypuronector
  †Hypuronector – type locality for genus
  - †Hypuronector limnaios – type locality for species
- †Hystrichosphaeridium
  - †Hystrichosphaeridium armatum – or unidentified comparable form
  - †Hystrichosphaeridium multicornutum – type locality for species
  - †Hystrichosphaeridium raritanianum – type locality for species

== I ==
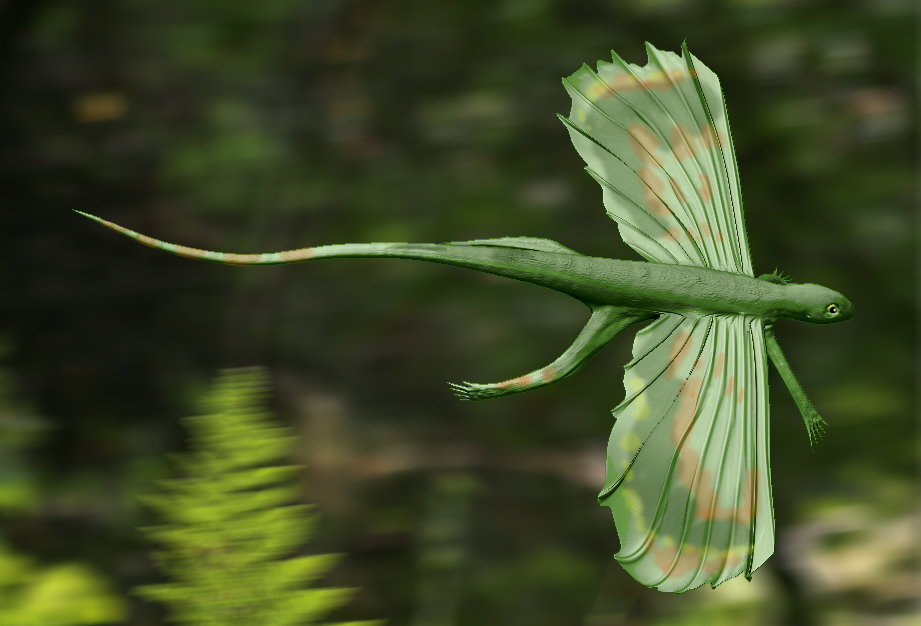
- Restoration of the Late Triassic gliding reptile Icarosaurus
  †Icarosaurus – type locality for genus
  - †Icarosaurus siefkeri – type locality for species
- †Inaperturopollenites
  - †Inaperturopollenites atlanticus – or unidentified comparable form
  - †Inaperturopollenites tenuis – type locality for species
- †Inoceramus
  - †Inoceramus proximus
- †Inoperna
  - †Inoperna carolinensis
- †Ischyodus
  - †Ischyodus bifurcatus
- †Ischyrhiza
  - †Ischyrhiza mira
- †Ischyriza
  - †Ischyriza mira
- †Izleiina
  - †Izleiina spinitibialis – type locality for species

== J ==
- †Jantarimantis – type locality for genus
  - †Jantarimantis zherikhini – type locality for species
- †Jantaropterix
  - †Jantaropterix newjersey – type locality for species
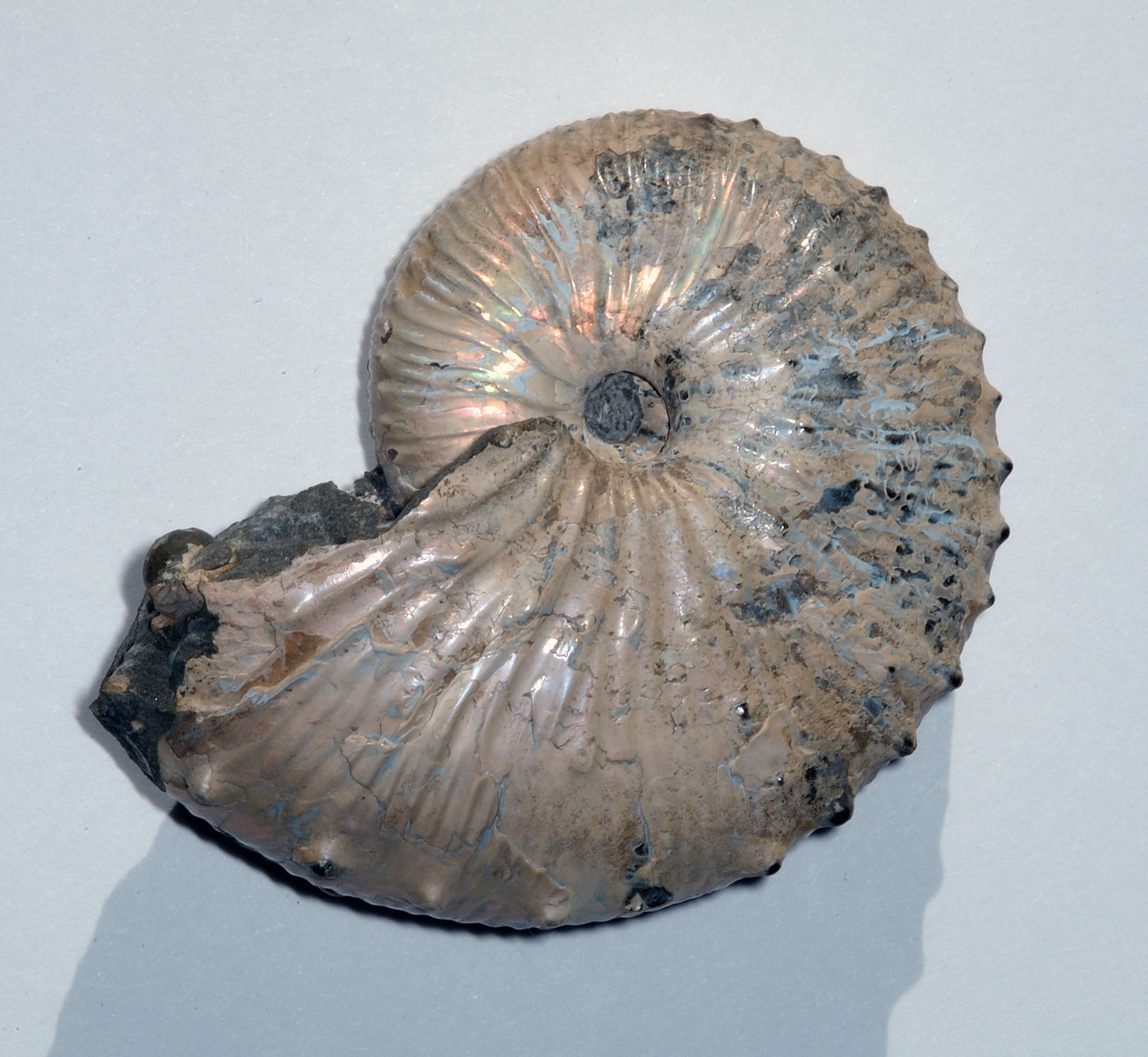
- Fossilized shell of the Late Cretaceous ammonoid cephalopod Jeletzkytes
  †Jeletzkytes
  - †Jeletzkytes criptonodosus
  - †Jeletzkytes nodosus – or unidentified comparable form
  - †Jeletzkytes plenus – or unidentified comparable form
- †Jersambromyia – type locality for genus
  - †Jersambromyia borodini – type locality for species
- †Jersaphis – type locality for genus
  - †Jersaphis luzzii – type locality for species
- †Jerseucoila – type locality for genus
  - †Jerseucoila plesiosoma – type locality for species
- †Jerseyempheria – type locality for genus
  - †Jerseyempheria grimaldii – type locality for species
- †Jerseyuloborus – type locality for genus
  - †Jerseyuloborus longisoma – type locality for species
- †Jersiberotha – type locality for genus
  - †Jersiberotha luzzii – type locality for species
  - †Jersiberotha similis – type locality for species
- †Jersicoccus – type locality for genus
  - †Jersicoccus kurthi – type locality for species
- †Jersimantis – type locality for genus
  - †Jersimantis luzzii – type locality for species
- †Jersimantispa
  - †Jersimantispa henryi – type locality for species
- Juliacorbula
  - †Juliacorbula monmouthensis

== K ==
- †Kitchinites
- †Klukisporites
  - †Klukisporites variegatus
- †Koteya – type locality for genus
  - †Koteya luzzii – type locality for species
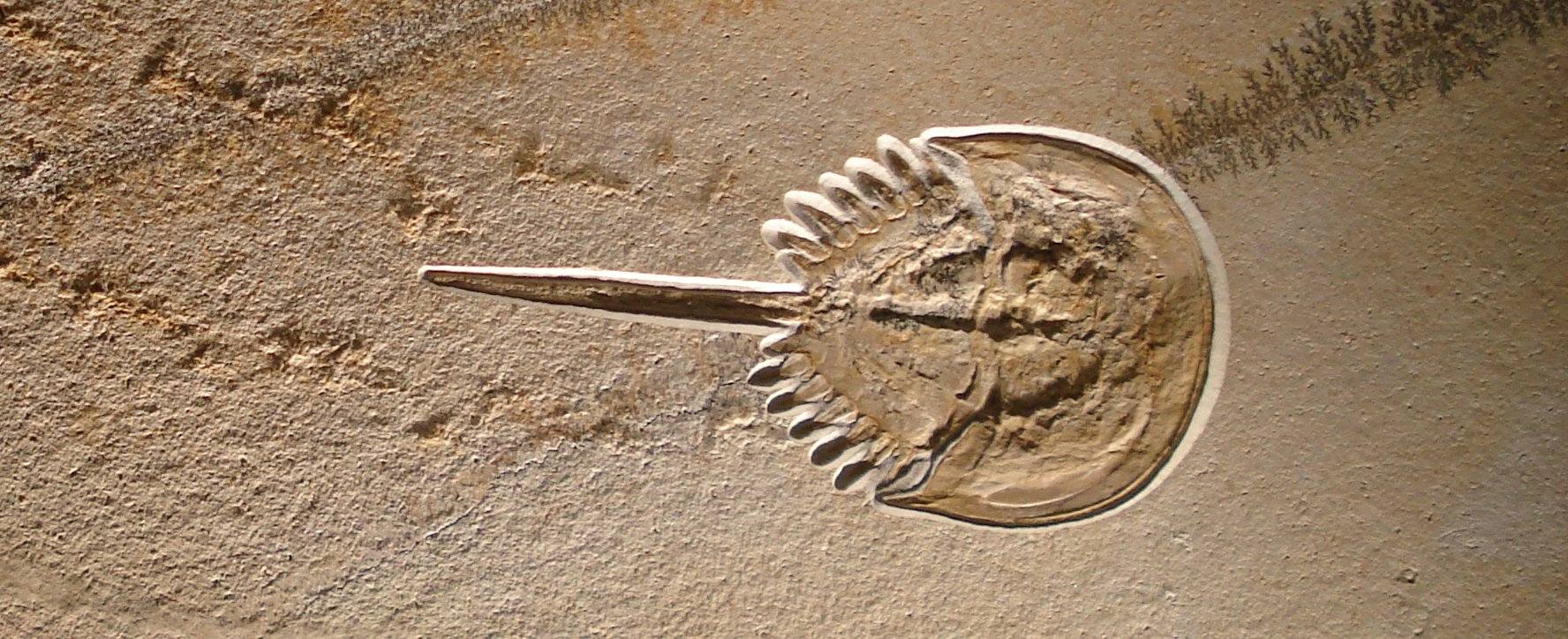
- Fossil of the Late Jurassic horseshoe crab Mesolimulus at the end of the trackway that it produced of the ichnogenus Kouphichnium
  †Kouphichnium
- †Kyromyrma – type locality for genus
  - †Kyromyrma neffi – type locality for species

== L ==
- †Labiococcus – type locality for genus
  - †Labiococcus joosti – type locality for species
- †Lagonomegops
  - †Lagonomegops americanus – type locality for species
- †Laornis – type locality for genus
  - †Laornis edvardsianus – type locality for species
- Laternula
  - †Laternula tenuis
- †Latiala
  - †Latiala lobata
- †Legumen
  - †Legumen apressus
  - †Legumen concentricum
  - †Legumen ellipticum
  - †Legumen ellipticus
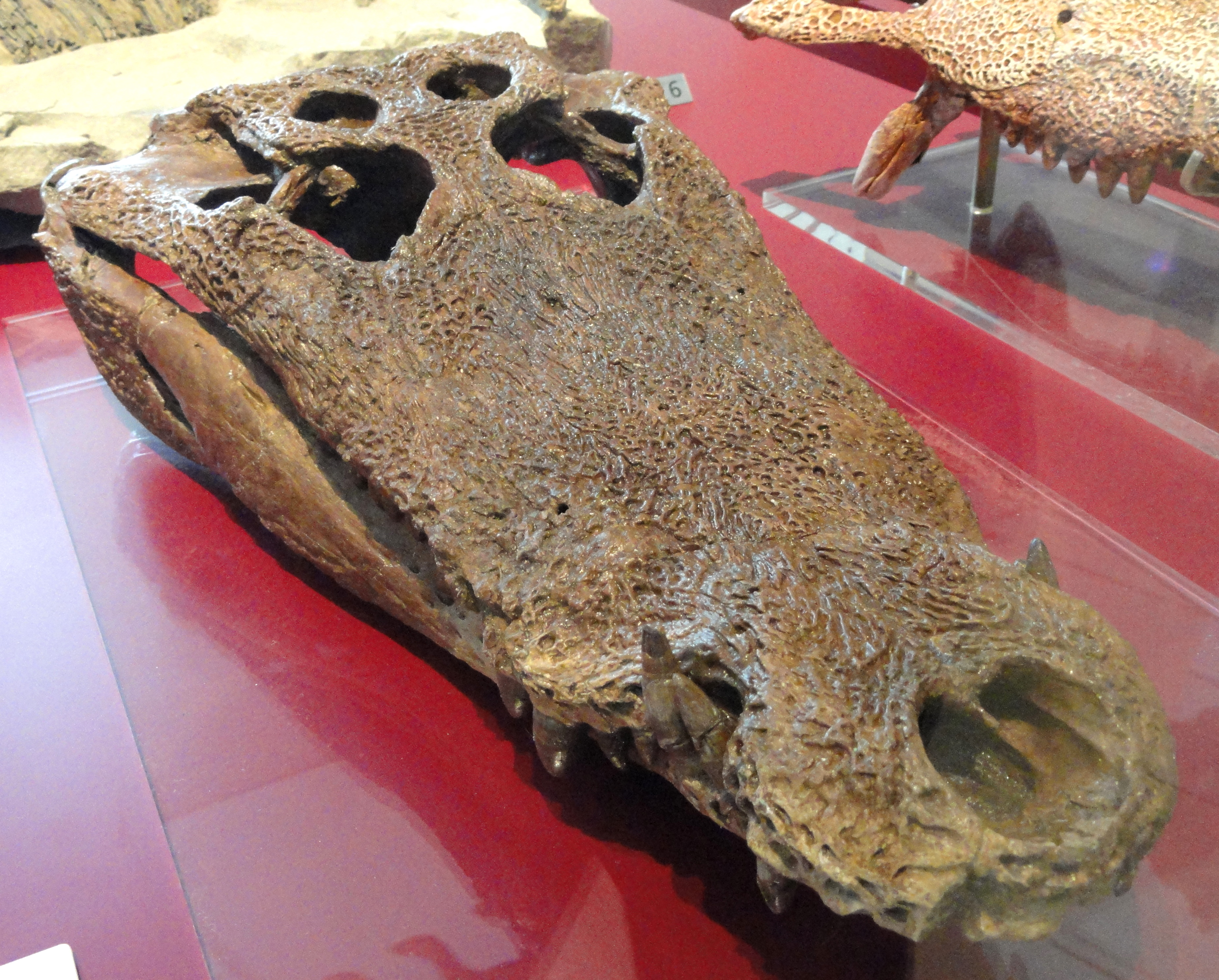
- Fossilized skull of the Late Cretaceous alligator relative Leidyosuchus
  †Leidyosuchus
- Leptoconops
  - †Leptoconops copiosus – type locality for species
  - †Leptoconops curvachelus – type locality for species
- †Leptosolen
  - †Leptosolen biplicata
  - †Leptosolen elongata
- †Lewyites
  - †Lewyites oronensis
- †Liadopsylla
  - †Liadopsylla hesperia – type locality for species
- †Liassocupes
  - †Liassocupes parvus
- Lima
  - †Lima pelagica
  - †Lima whitfieldi
- Limatula
  - †Limatula acutilineata
- †Limonia
  - †Limonia dillonae – type locality for species
- Limopsis
- †Linearea
  - †Linearea metastriata
- †Linearis
  - †Linearis contracta
  - †Linearis metastriata
- Linuparus
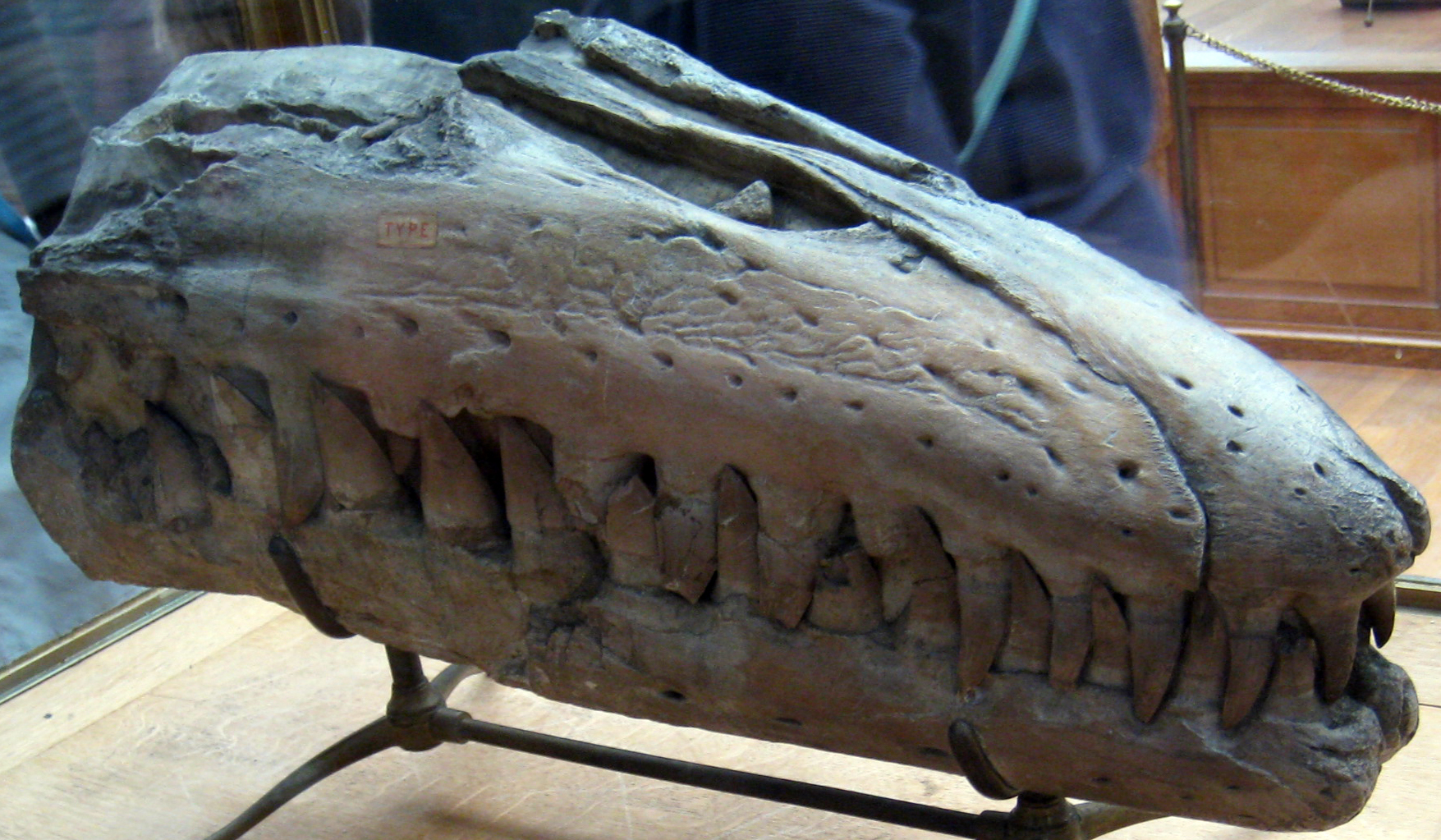
- Partial fossilized jaws of the Late Cretaceous mosasaur Liodon
  †Liodon
  - †Liodon validus – type locality for species
- †Liopistha
  - †Liopistha protexta
- †Lissodus
- Lithophaga
  - †Lithophaga smocki
- †Longitubus
  - †Longitubus lineatus
- Lopha
  - †Lopha falcata
  - †Lopha mesenterica
- †Loreisomorpha – type locality for genus
  - †Loreisomorpha nascimbenei – type locality for species
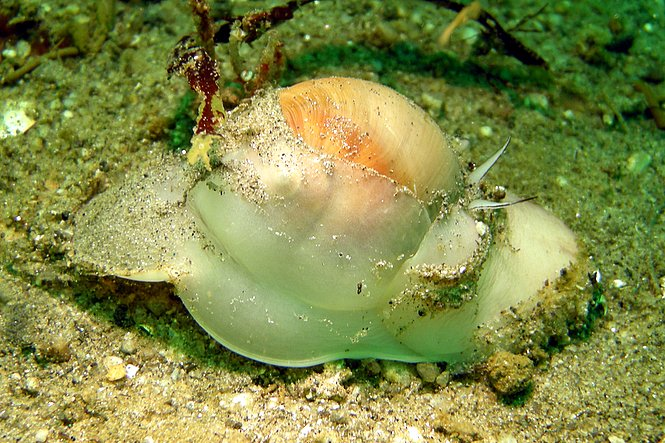
- A living Lunatia moon sea snail
  Lunatia
  - †Lunatia paludiformis
- †Lycopodiacidites
  - †Lycopodiacidites baculatus
- †Lycopodiumsporites
  - †Lycopodiumsporites cerniidites
  - †Lycopodiumsporites clavatoides
- †Lyriochlamys
  - †Lyriochlamys whitfieldi
- Lytoloma
  - †Lytoloma jeanesii – type locality for species

== M ==
- †Mabelia – type locality for genus
  - †Mabelia archaia – type locality for species
  - †Mabelia connatifila – type locality for species
- †Machaerosaurus – or unidentified comparable form
- Malletia
  - †Malletia littlei
  - †Malletia stephensoni
- †Mantispidiptera – type locality for genus
  - †Mantispidiptera enigmatica – type locality for species
- †Margaritella
  - †Margaritella pumila
- Martesia
  - †Martesia cretacea magnatuba
- †Matonisporites
  - †Matonisporites globosus – type locality for species
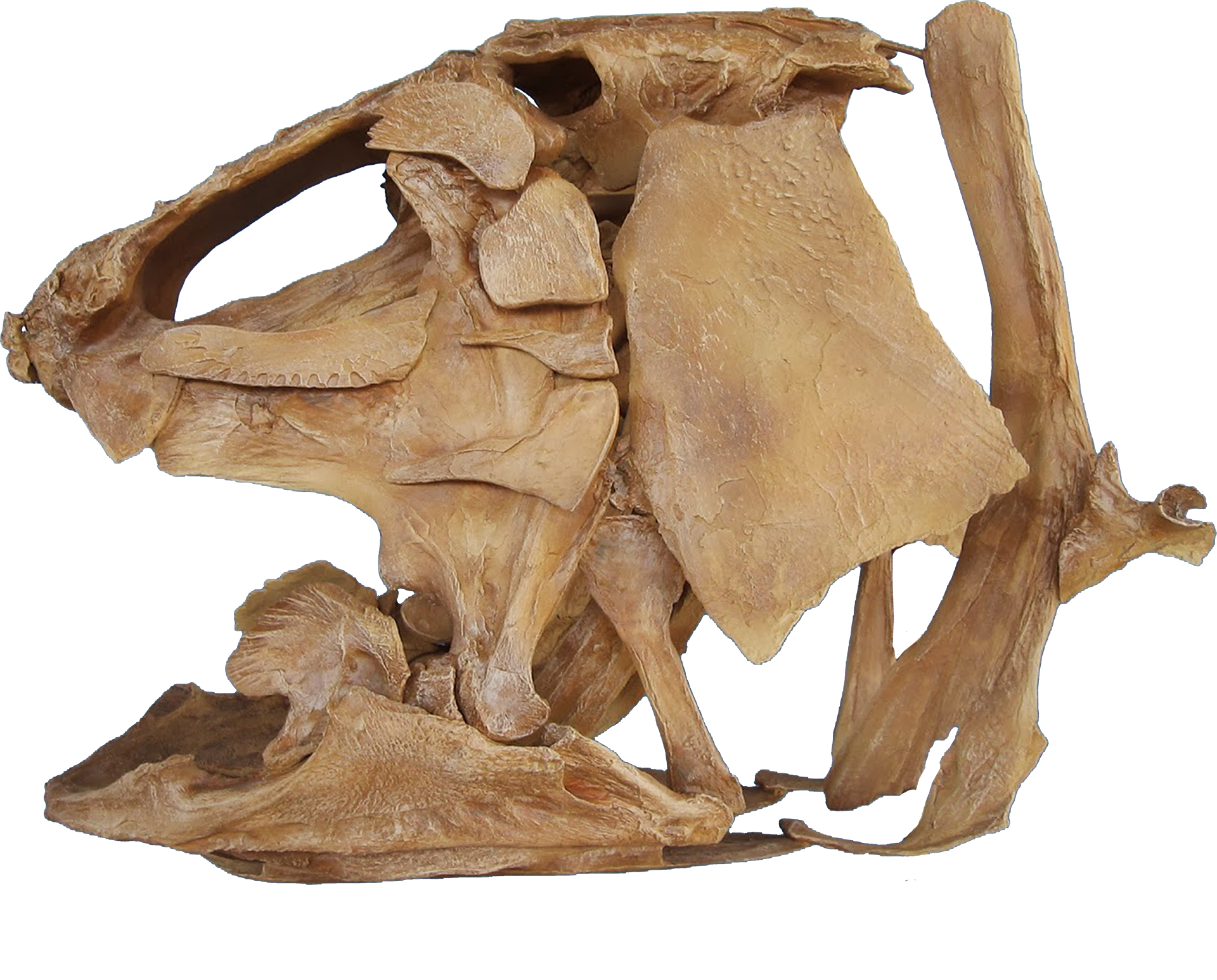
- Fossilized skull of the Late Cretceous coelacanth fish Megalocoelacanthus
  †Megalocoelacanthus
  - †Megalocoelacanthus dobiei
- †Meleagrinella
  - †Meleagrinella abrupta
- †Menabites
  - †Menabites delawareneis
  - †Menabites delawarensis
  - †Menabites vanuxemi
  - †Menabites walnutensis
- †Menuites
  - †Menuites complexus
- †Mesotachyporus – type locality for genus
  - †Mesotachyporus puer – type locality for species
- †Metoicoceras
  - †Metoicoceras bergquisti
- †Metopina
  - †Metopina goeleti – type locality for species
- †Micrabacia
- †Microaltingia – type locality for genus
  - †Microaltingia apocarpela – type locality for species
- †Milnesium
  - †Milnesium swolenskyi – type locality for species
- †Minyorussus – type locality for genus
  - †Minyorussus luzzii – type locality for species
- †Miocardiopsis
- †Modiolus
  - †Modiolus juliae
  - †Modiolus sedesclaris
  - †Modiolus sedesclarus
- †Monosulcites
  - †Monosulcites scaber – type locality for species
- †Morea
  - †Morea marylandica
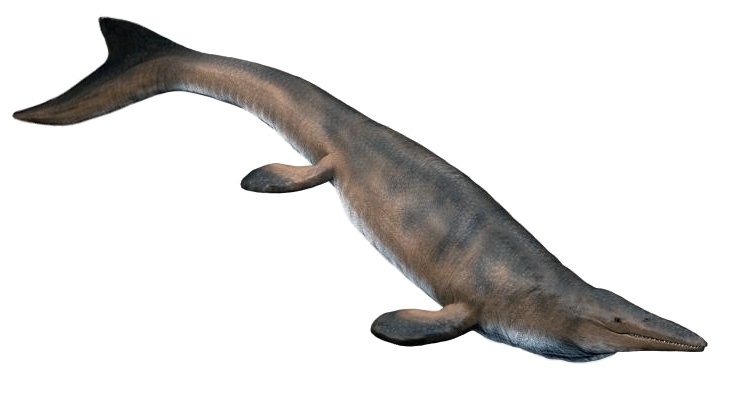
- Life restoration of the Late Cretaceous Mosasaurus
  †Mosasaurus
  - †Mosasaurus conodon – type locality for species
  - †Mosasaurus dekayi – type locality for species
  - †Mosasaurus dekayii – type locality for species
  - †Mosasaurus maximus – type locality for species
- †Mytilus – tentative report
  - †Mytilus planus

== N ==
- †Napulus
  - †Napulus octoliratus
- †Nascimberotha – type locality for genus
  - †Nascimberotha picta – type locality for species
- †Naviculaformipites – type locality for genus
  - †Naviculaformipites atlanticus – type locality for species
  - †Naviculaformipites psilatus – type locality for species
- †Nedocosia
  - †Nedocosia novacaesarea – type locality for species
- †Neithea
  - †Neithea quinquecostata
- †Nemedromia
  - †Nemedromia turonia – type locality for species
- †Nemocardium
- †Nemodon
  - †Nemodon eufalensis
  - †Nemodon eufaulensis
  - †Nemodon stantoni
- †Neoturonius – type locality for genus
  - †Neoturonius asymmetrus – type locality for species
  - †Neoturonius cretatus – type locality for species
  - †Neoturonius vetus – type locality for species
- †Newjersevania – type locality for genus
  - †Newjersevania casei – type locality for species
  - †Newjersevania nascimbenei – type locality for species
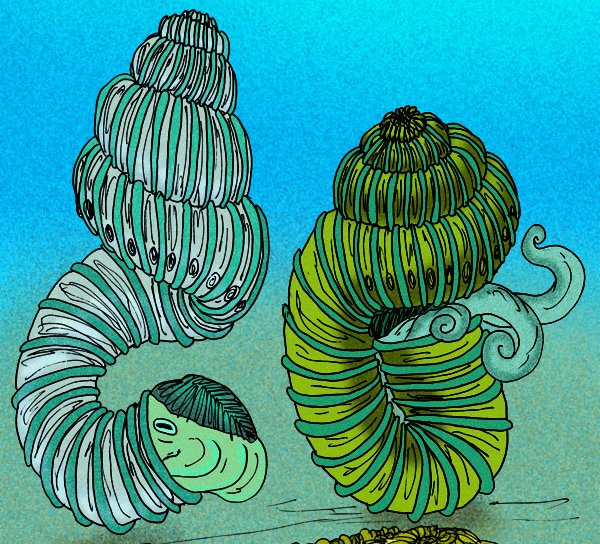
- Restoration of several species of the Late Cretaceous ammonoid cephalopod Nostoceras
  †Nostoceras
  - †Nostoceras alternatum
  - †Nostoceras appoximans
  - †Nostoceras helicinus
  - †Nostoceras hyatti
  - †Nostoceras mendryki
  - †Nostoceras pauper
- †Novajerseya – type locality for genus
  - †Novajerseya glesumica – type locality for species
- Nucula
  - †Nucula angulatum
  - †Nucula camia
  - †Nucula cuneifrons
  - †Nucula percrassa
  - †Nucula protexta
  - †Nucula slackiana
  - †Nucula stephensoni
  - †Nucula whitfieldi
- Nuculana
  - †Nuculana longifrons
  - †Nuculana protexta
  - †Nuculana whitfieldi
- †Nuhliantha – type locality for genus
  - †Nuhliantha nyanzaiana – type locality for species
- †Nymphalucina
  - †Nymphalucina linearia

== O ==
- †Odaxosaurus – or unidentified comparable form
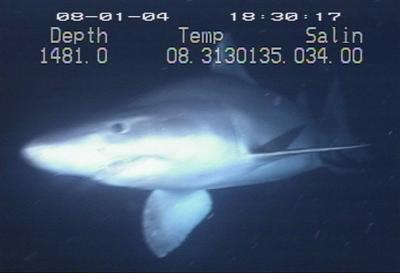
- A living Odontaspis sand shark
  Odontaspis
  - †Odontaspis aculeatus
  - †Odontaspis samhammeri
- †Odontofusus
  - †Odontofusus mucronata
- Oecobius – tentative report
- †Oligoptycha
- Oncopareia – or unidentified comparable form
- †Oodnadattia
  - †Oodnadattia cooksonii – type locality for species
- †Oolopygus
  - †Oolopygus williamsi
- †Opertochasma
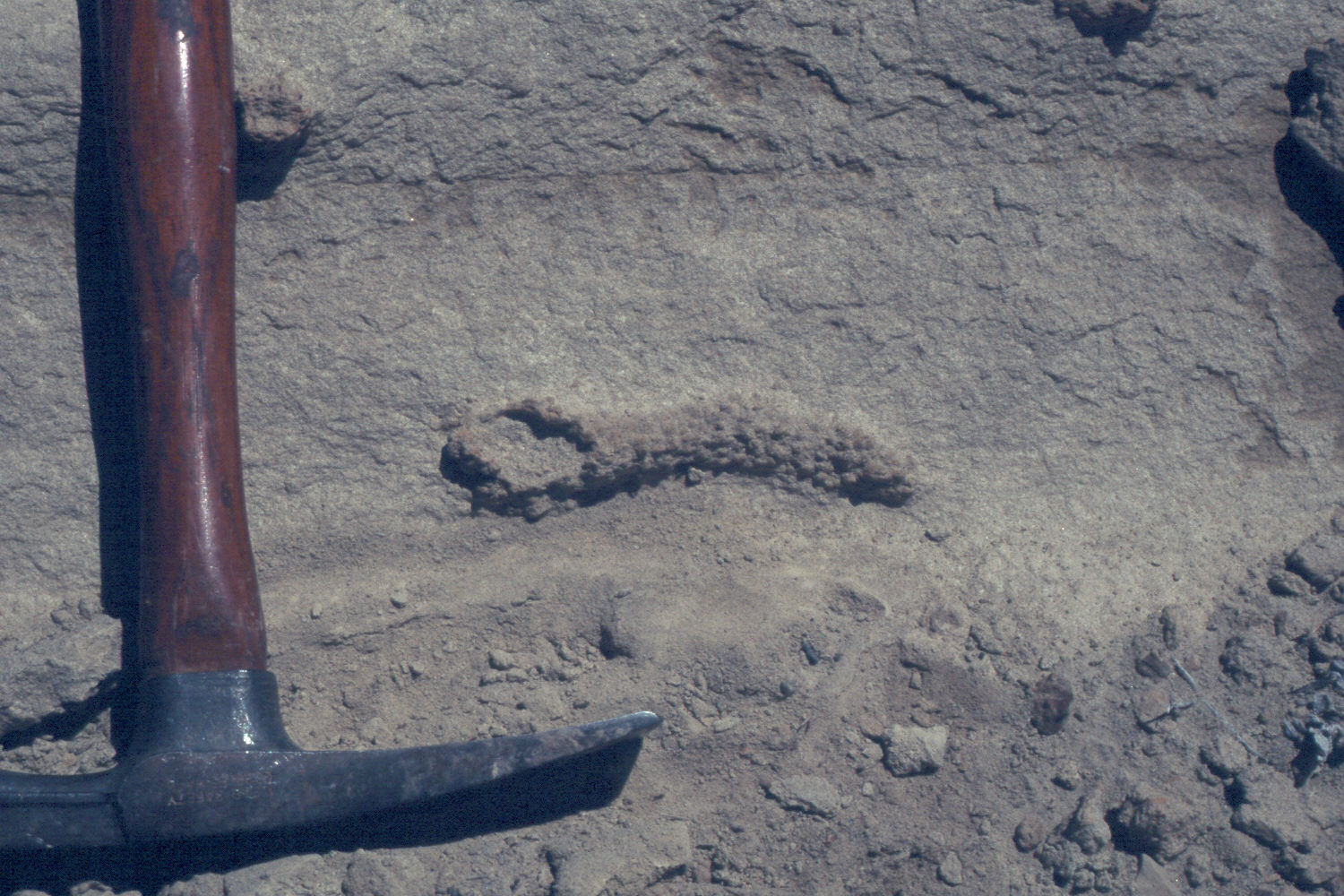
- Fossil of the Permian-modern crustacean burrow ichnogenus Ophiomorpha
  †Ophiomorpha
  - †Ophiomorpha nodosa
- Orchestina
- †Osmundacidites
  - †Osmundacidites wellmanii – or unidentified comparable form
- †Osteopleurus
  - †Osteopleurus newarki
- †Osteopygis – type locality for genus
  - †Osteopygis borealis – type locality for species
  - †Osteopygis emarginatus – type locality for species
  - †Osteopygis erosus – type locality for species
  - †Osteopygis platylomus – type locality for species
  - †Osteopygis robustus – type locality for species
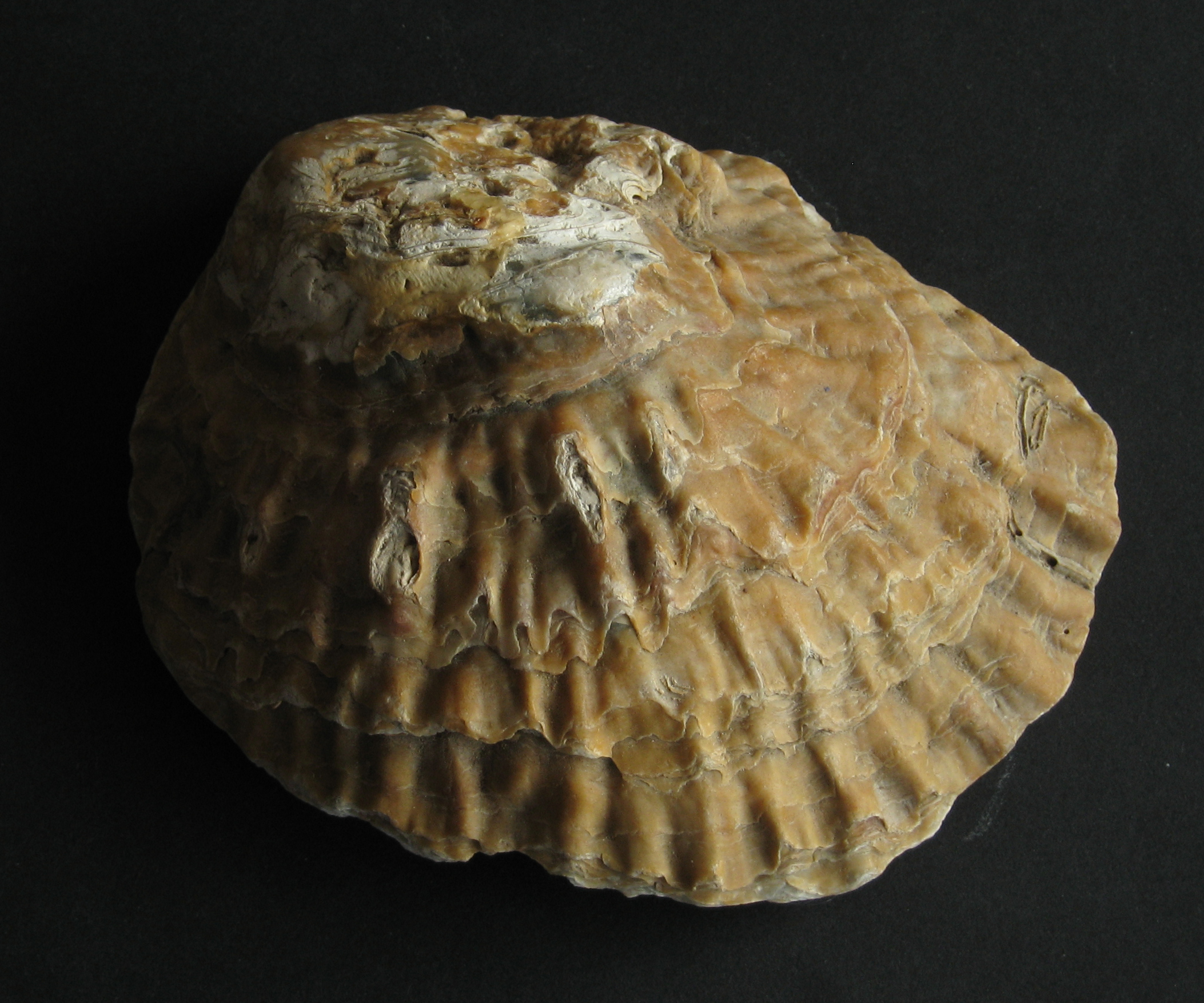
- Shell of an Ostrea, or oyster
  Ostrea
  - †Ostrea denticulifera
  - †Ostrea subspatulata
- †Oxyrhina
  - †Oxyrhina desorii

== P ==
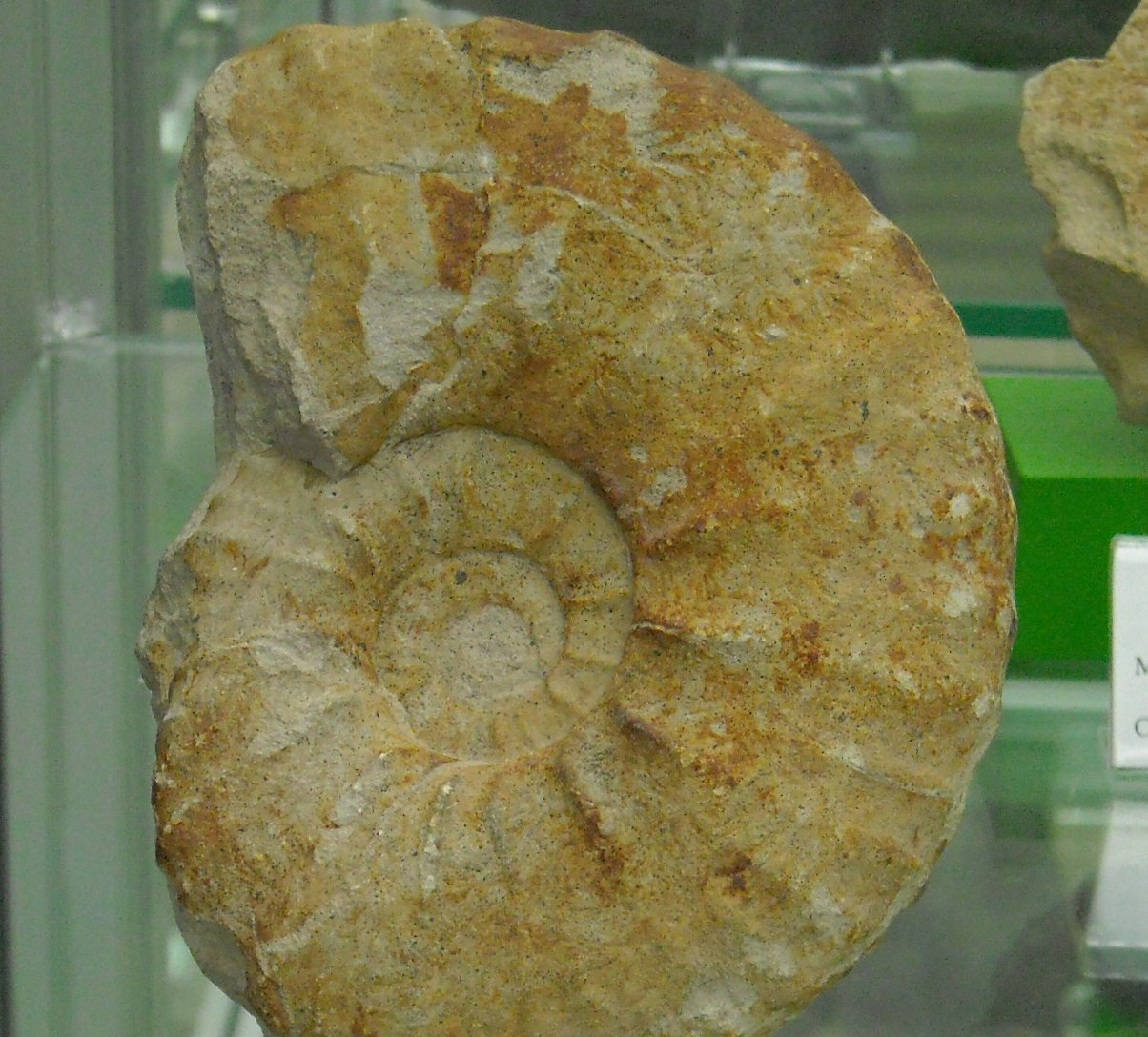
- Fossilized shell of the Late Cretaceous ammonoid cephalopod Pachydiscus
  †Pachydiscus
  - †Pachydiscus mokotibensis
  - †Pachydiscus neubergicus
- Pagurus
- †Paladmete
  - †Paladmete cancellaria
  - †Paladmete laevis
- †Palaeagapetus
  - †Palaeagapetus furcilla – type locality for species
- †Palaeobrachypogon
  - †Palaeobrachypogon grandiforceps – type locality for species
  - †Palaeobrachypogon remmi
- †Palaeometropus – type locality for genus
  - †Palaeometropus cassus – type locality for species
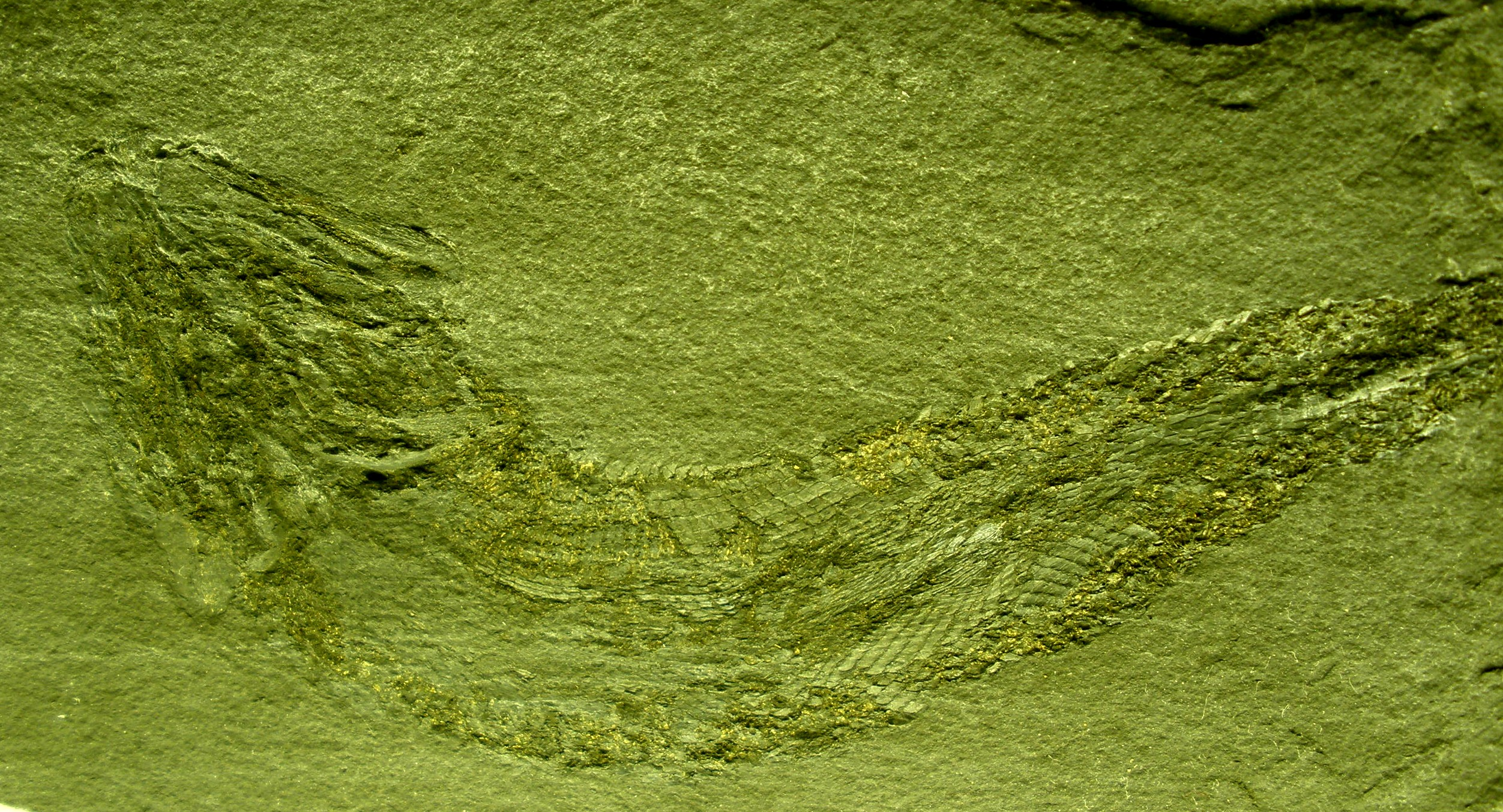
- Fossilized skeleton of the Permian bony fish Palaeoniscum
  †Palaeoniscus
  - †Palaeoniscus agassizii
  - †Palaeoniscus fultus
  - †Palaeoniscus latus
- †Palaeopagurus – tentative report
- †Palaeosegestria – type locality for genus
  - †Palaeosegestria lutzzii – type locality for species
- †Palaeotringa – type locality for genus
  - †Palaeotringa littoralis – type locality for species
  - †Palaeotringa vagans – type locality for species
- †Paleoenkianthus – type locality for genus
  - †Paleoenkianthus sayrevillensis – type locality for species
- †Paleofusimitra
- Panopea
  - †Panopea deciea
  - †Panopea decisa
  - †Panopea descisa
- †Paracupes
  - †Paracupes svitkoi – type locality for species
- †Paracyathus – tentative report
  - †Paracyathus vaughani
- †Paralbula
  - †Paralbula casei
- †Paranomia
  - †Paranomia scabra
- †Paranomotodon
  - †Paranomotodon angustidens
- †Pariostegeus
- †Parmicorbula
  - †Parmicorbula percompressa
  - †Parmicorbula torta
- †Parrisia – type locality for genus
  - †Parrisia neocesariensis – type locality for species
- †Parvisaccites
  - †Parvisaccites sphaericorpus – type locality for species
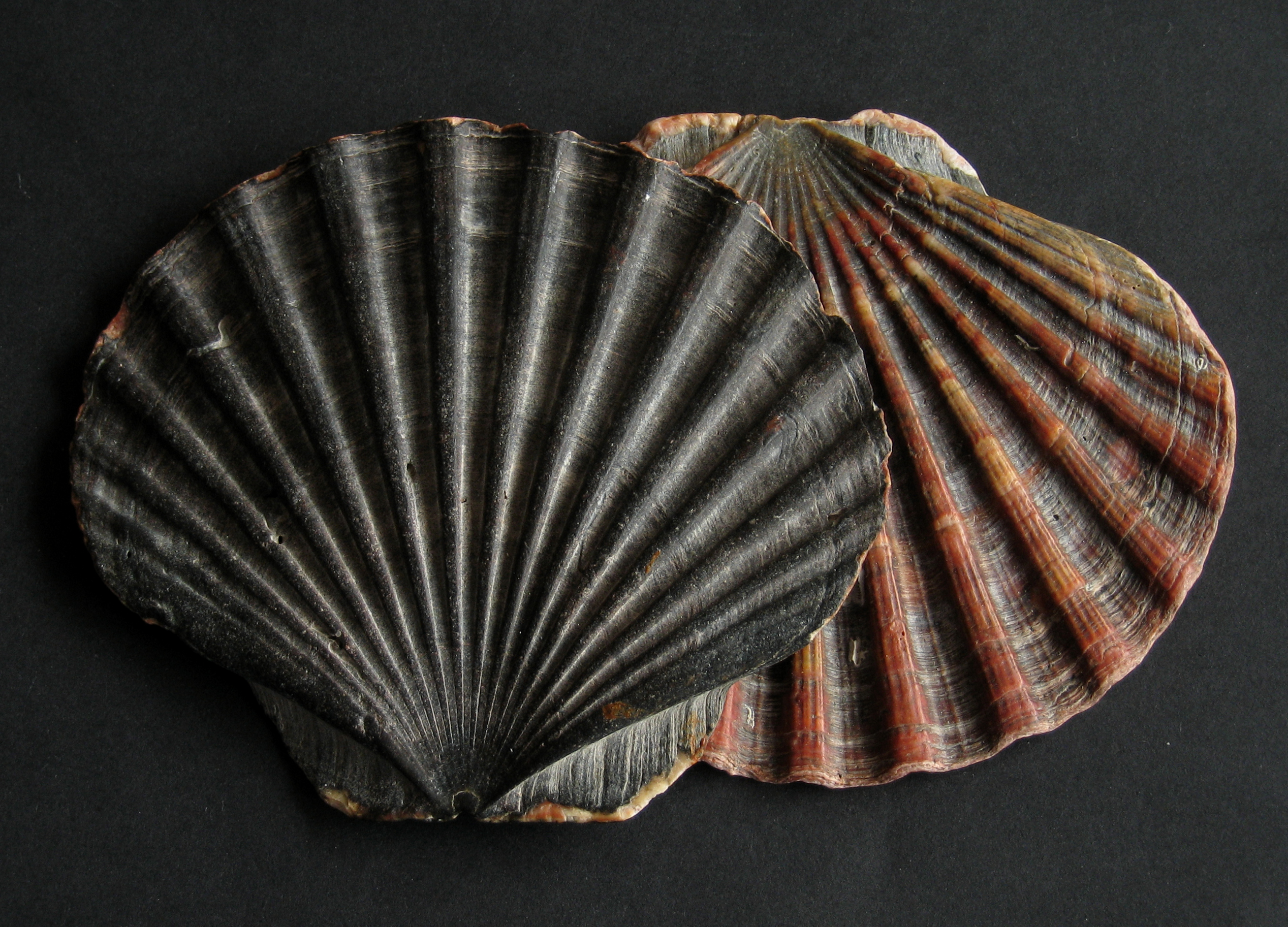
- Shells of Pecten scallops
  †Pecten
  - †Pecten quinquecostata
  - †Pecten quinquenarius
  - †Pecten simplicius
  - †Pecten venustus
  - †Pecten whitfieldi
- †Perforissus – type locality for genus
  - †Perforissus muiri – type locality for species
- †Periplomya
  - †Periplomya jerseyana
- †Peritresius
  - †Peritresius ornatus
- †Perrisonota
  - †Perrisonota littlei
  - †Perrisonota protexta
- †Perseanthus – type locality for genus
  - †Perseanthus crossmanensis – type locality for species
- Phacoides
  - †Phacoides mattiformis
- †Phloeocharis
  - †Phloeocharis agerata – type locality for species
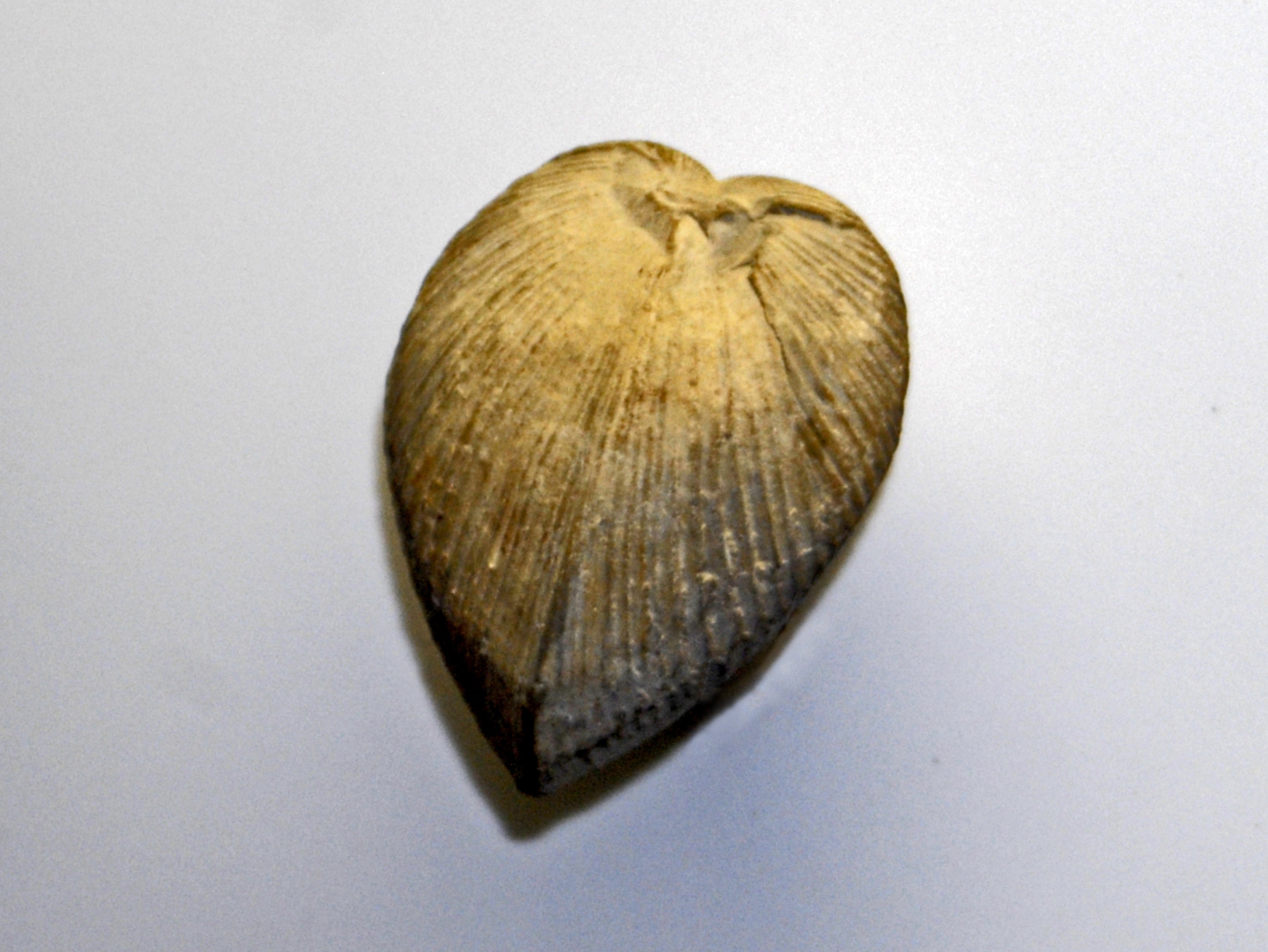
- Fossilized shell of the Early Triassic-Pliocene marine bivalve Pholadomya
  Pholadomya
  - †Pholadomya occidentalis
  - †Pholadomya roemeri
- Pholas
- †Phylocentropus – type locality for genus
  - †Phylocentropus cretaceous – type locality for species
  - †Phylocentropus gelhausi – type locality for species
  - †Phylocentropus swolenskyi – type locality for species
- †Piceaepollenites
  - †Piceaepollenites alatus
  - †Piceaepollenites subconcinnus – type locality for species
- †Pilosisporites
  - †Pilosisporites papilloides – type locality for species
- †Pinna
  - †Pinna laqueata
  - †Pinna loqueata
- †Pinuspollenites
  - †Pinuspollenites granulatus – type locality for species
  - †Pinuspollenites megasaccus – type locality for species
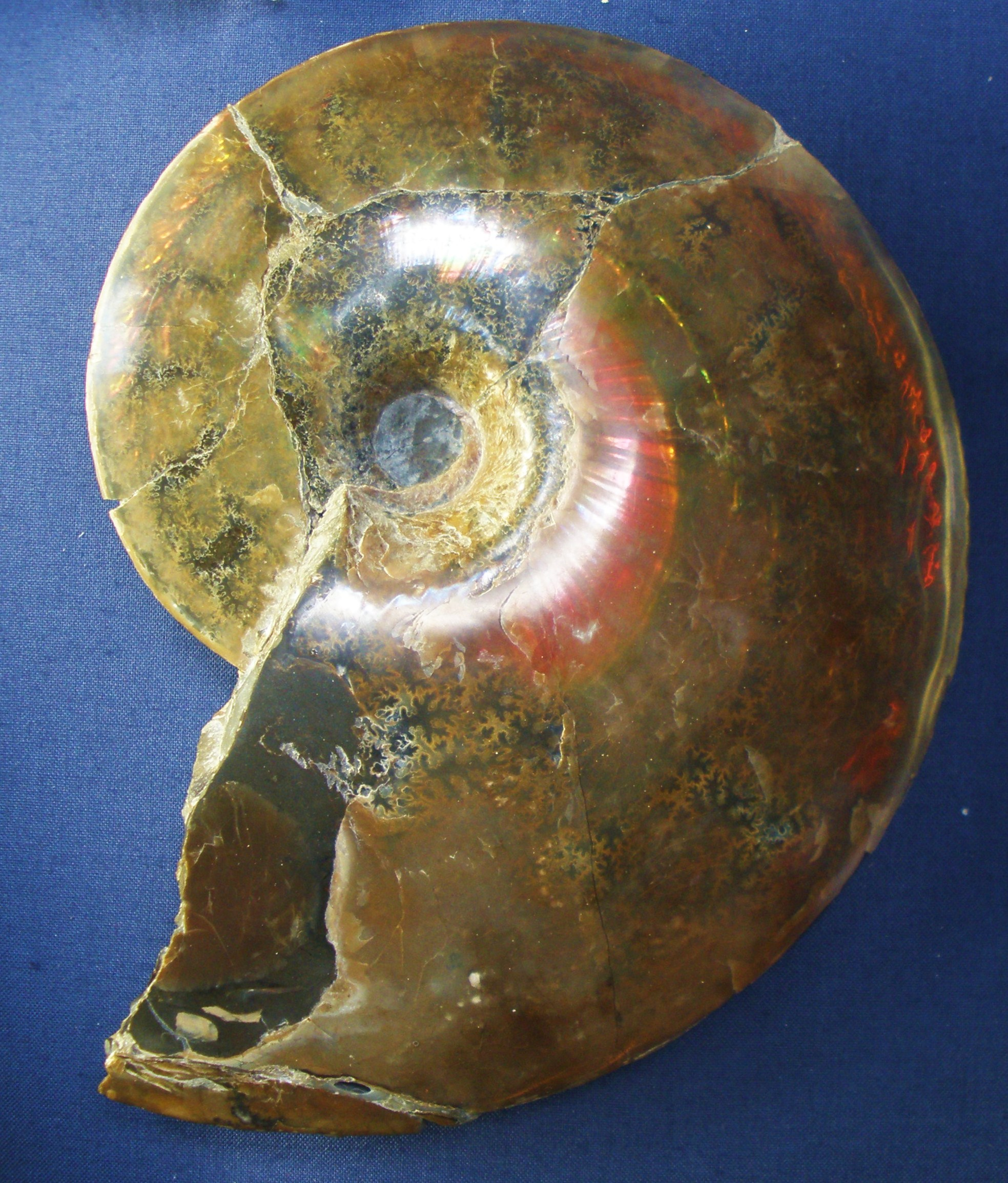
- Fossilized shell of the Late Cretaceous ammonoid cephalopod Placenticeras
  †Placenticeras
  - †Placenticeras placenta
  - †Placenticeras syrtale – tentative report
- †Plagiostoma
  - †Plagiostoma erecta
- †Platacodon – or unidentified comparable form
- †Platysaccus
  - †Platysaccus radiatus – type locality for species
- †Plesiosaurus
  - †Plesiosaurus brevifemur – type locality for species
- †Pleuriocardia
  - †Pleuriocardia eufalensis
  - †Pleuriocardia wenonah
- †Plicatolamna
  - †Plicatolamna arcuata
- Plicatula
  - †Plicatula howelli
  - †Plicatula mullicaensis
  - †Plicatula urticosa
- †Plioplatecarpus
  - †Plioplatecarpus depressus – type locality for species
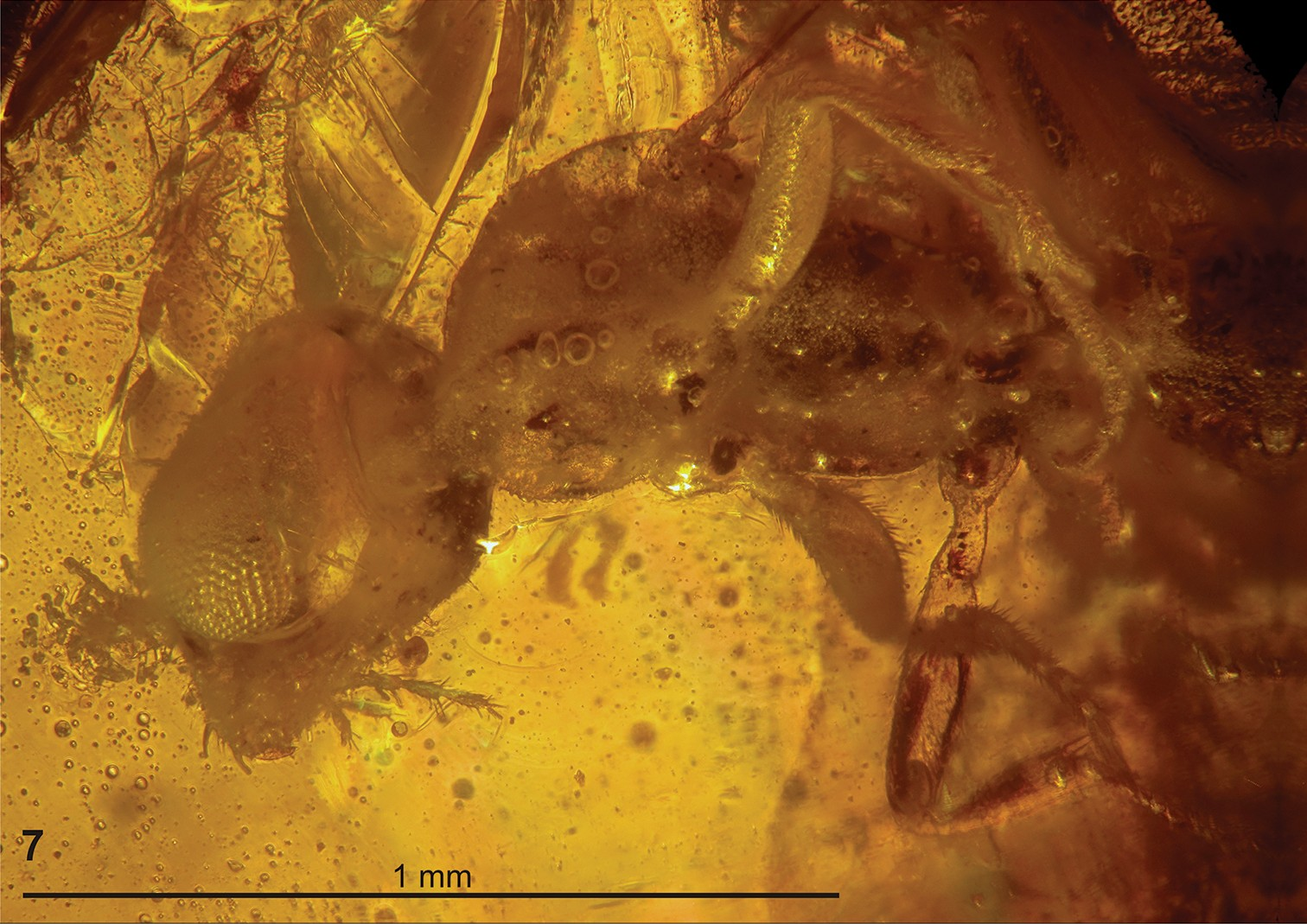
- Amber-entombed specimen of the Late Cretaceous wasp Plumalexius
  †Plumalexius – type locality for genus
  - †Plumalexius rasnitsyni – type locality for species
- †Podocarpidites
  - †Podocarpidites ellipticus
- Polinices
- †Postligata
  - †Postligata wordeni
- †Postopsyllidium – type locality for genus
  - †Postopsyllidium emilyae – type locality for species
- †Praeleda
  - †Praeleda compar
- †Prionochelys
  - †Prionochelys nauta
- †Prioriphora
  - †Prioriphora casei – type locality for species
  - †Prioriphora luzzii – type locality for species
- †Pristis
  - †Pristis curvidens
- †Procolophonichnium
- †Procolpochelys
  - †Procolpochelys grandaeva
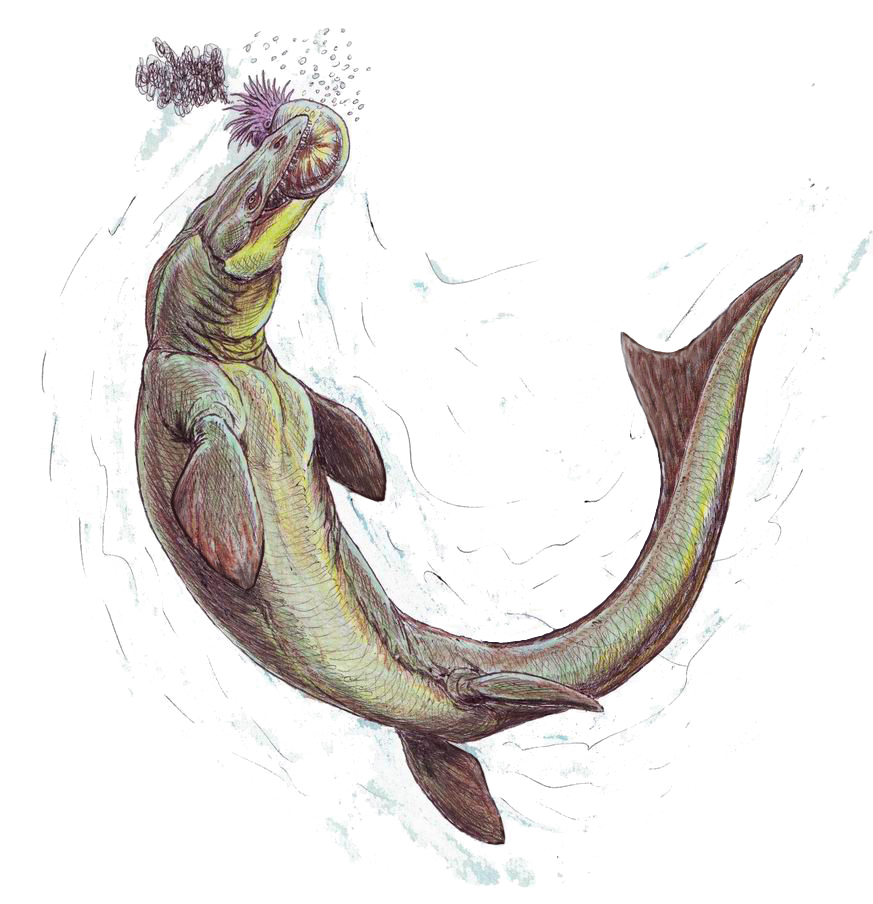
- Life restoration of the Late Cretaceous mosasaur Prognathodon preying upon an ammonoid cephalopod
  †Prognathodon
  - †Prognathodon rapax – type locality for species
  - †Prognathodon sectorius – type locality for species
- †Proratites – type locality for genus
  - †Proratites simplex – type locality for species
- †Protalphadon
  - †Protalphadon lulli
- †Proteacidites
  - †Proteacidites rectilatus – type locality for species
- †Protocallianassa
  - †Protocallianassa mortoni
  - †Protocallianassa praecepta
- †Protocardia
  - †Protocardia spillmani
- †Protoculicoides
  - †Protoculicoides globosus
  - †Protoculicoides incompletus
- †Protoplatyrhina
  - †Protoplatyrhina renae
- †Protorhyssalus – type locality for genus
  - †Protorhyssalus goldmani – type locality for species
- †Prototeius – type locality for genus
  - †Prototeius stageri – type locality for species
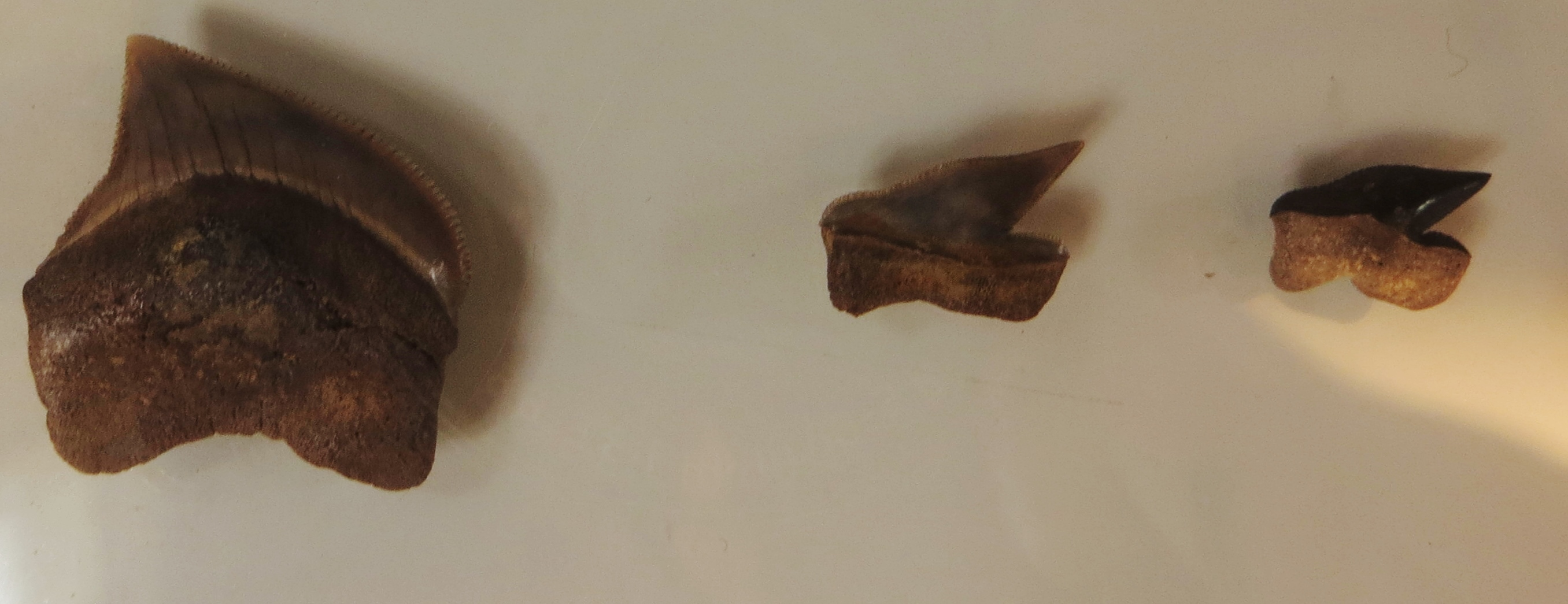
- Fossilized teeth of the Cretaceous shark Pseudocorax
  †Pseudocorax
  - †Pseudocorax granti
- †Pseudocuphosis – type locality for genus
  - †Pseudocuphosis tristis – type locality for species
- †Pseudodontaspis
  - †Pseudodontaspis herbsti – or unidentified comparable form
- †Pseudohypolophus
- †Pseudolimea
  - †Pseudolimea reticulata
- †Pseudophyllites
  - †Pseudophyllites indra
- †Psolimena – type locality for genus
  - †Psolimena electra – type locality for species
- †Pteria
  - †Pteria navicula
  - †Pteria petrosa
  - †Pteria rhombica
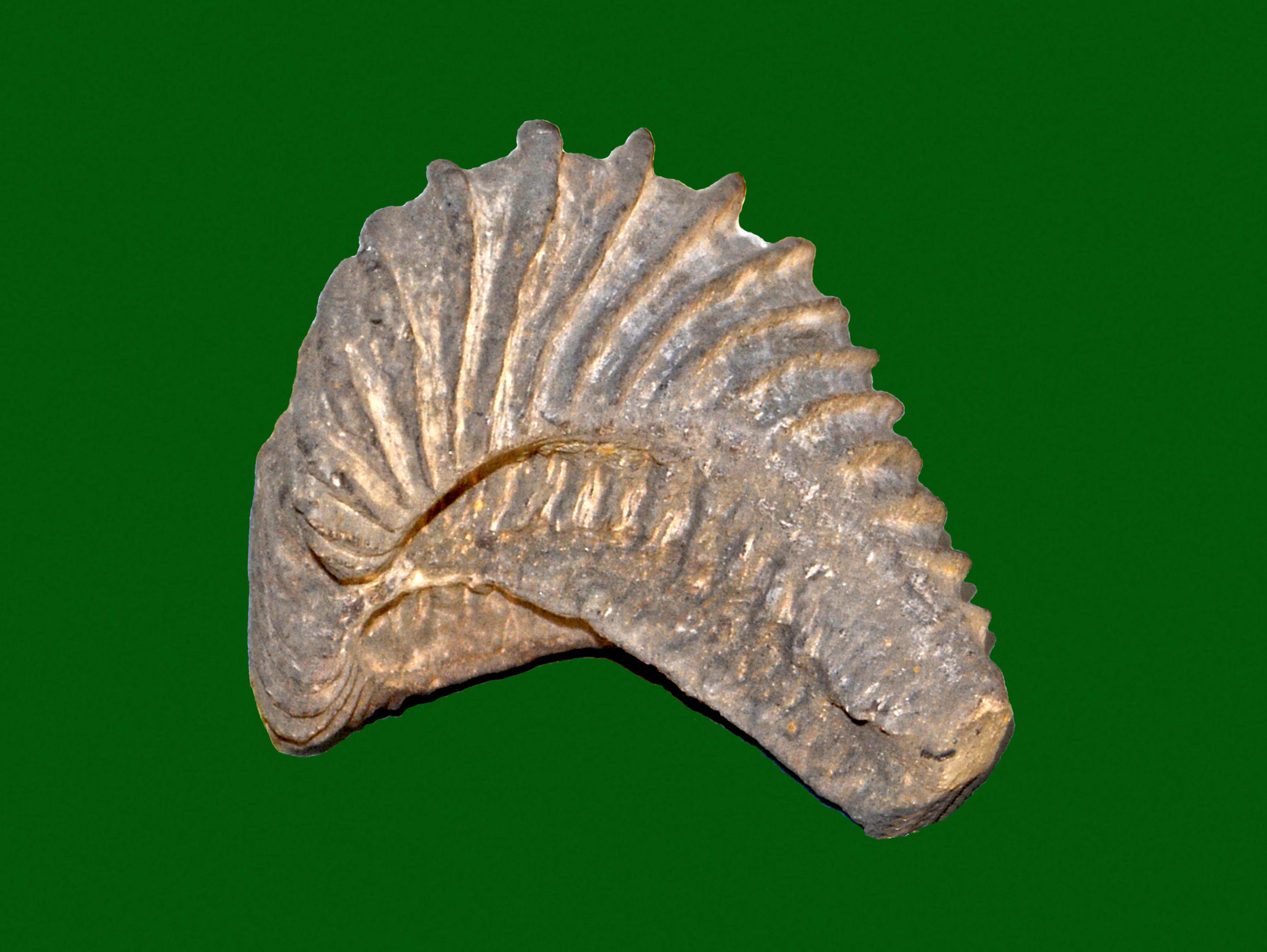
- Fossilized shell of the Jurassic-Cretaceous marine bivalve Pterotrigonia
  †Pterotrigonia
  - †Pterotrigonia angulicostata
  - †Pterotrigonia cerulea
  - †Pterotrigonia eufalensis
  - †Pterotrigonia eufaulensis
  - †Pterotrigonia kummeli
- †Ptychotrygon
  - †Ptychotrygon hooveri
  - †Ptychotrygon vermiculata
- Pycnodonte
  - †Pycnodonte convexa
  - †Pycnodonte mutabilis
  - †Pycnodonte vesiculare
  - †Pycnodonte vesicularis
- †Pyrifusus
  - †Pyrifusus macfarlandi
  - †Pyrifusus meeki
- †Pyropsis
  - †Pyropsis planimarginata
  - †Pyropsis trochiformis

== R ==
- †Radiopecten
  - †Radiopecten mississippiensis
  - †Radiopecten quinquenarius
  - †Radiopecten tenuitestus
- Rangia – tentative report
  - †Rangia tenuidens
- †Rasnitsynapus – type locality for genus
  - †Rasnitsynapus primigenius – type locality for species
- †Remnita
  - †Remnita biacuminata – or unidentified comparable form
- †Rhachibermissa – type locality for genus
  - †Rhachibermissa phenax – type locality for species
  - †Rhachibermissa splendida – type locality for species
- †Rhetechelys
  - †Rhetechelys platyops – type locality for species
- Rhinobatos
  - †Rhinobatos casieri
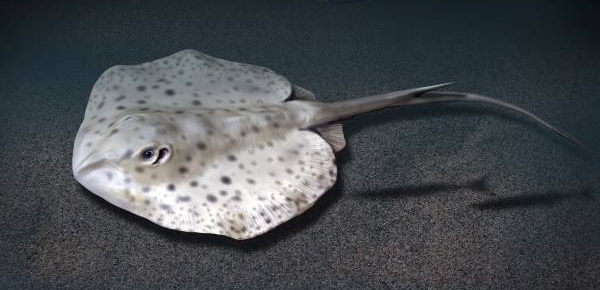
- Restoration of the Late Cretaceous-Paleocene ray Rhombodus
  †Rhombodus
  - †Rhombodus binkhorsti
  - †Rhombodus laevis
- †Rhynchosauroides
  - †Rhynchosauroides brunswickii
  - †Rhynchosauroides hyperbates – type locality for species
- Ringicula
  - †Ringicula clarki
- †Rostellites
  - †Rostellites nasutus
  - †Rostellites texturatus
- †Rouseisporites
  - †Rouseisporites laevigatus
- †Rugubivesiculites
  - †Rugubivesiculites multiplex
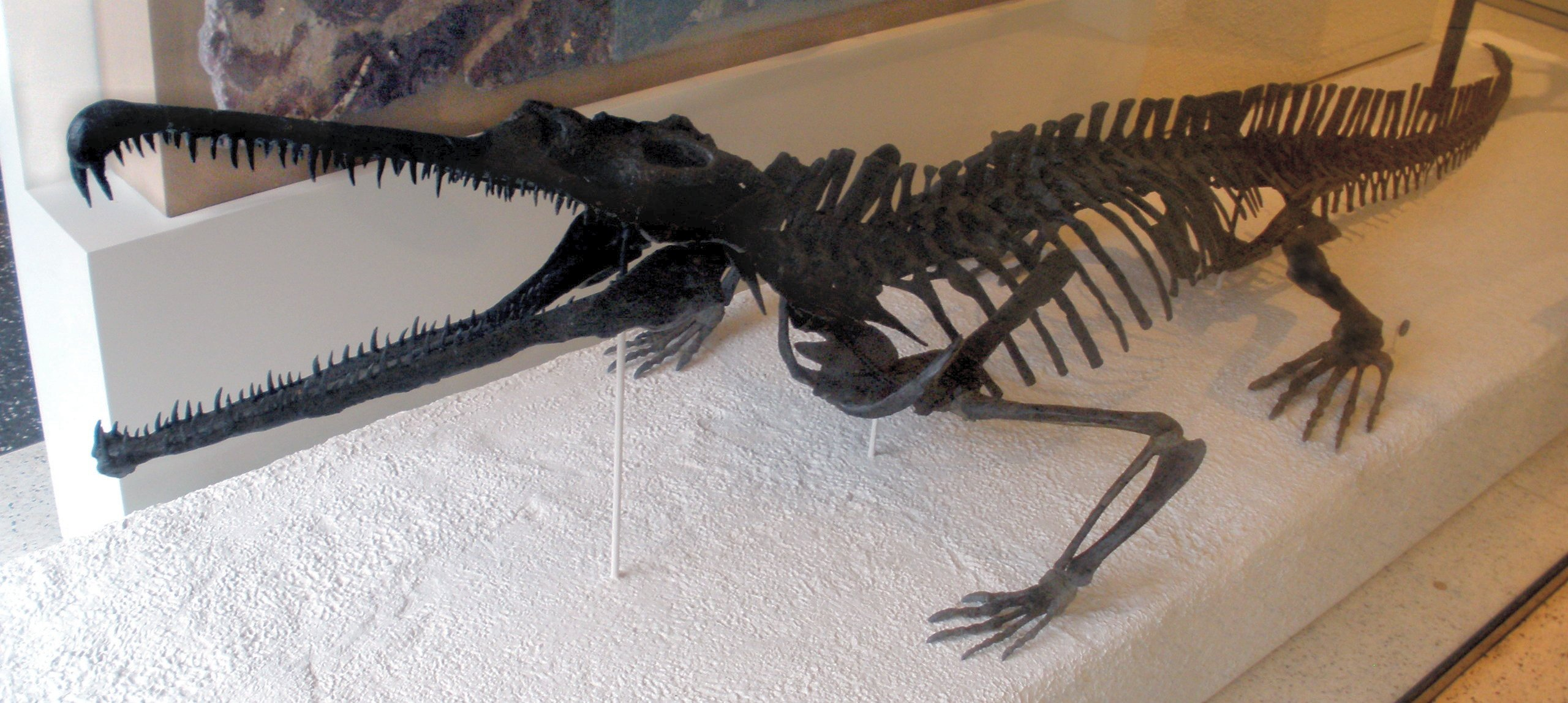
- Fossilized skeleton of the Late Triassic phytosaur Rutiodon
  †Rutiodon
  - †Rutiodon carolinensis
  - †Rutiodon manhattanensis – type locality for species

== S ==
- †Sabalpollenites
  - †Sabalpollenites dividuus – type locality for species
- †Sargana
- †Sauropus
  - †Sauropus ingens – type locality for species
- †Sayrevilleus – type locality for genus
  - †Sayrevilleus grimaldii – type locality for species
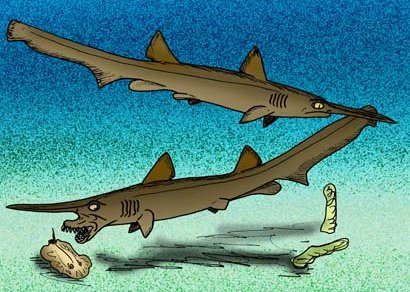
- Restoration of several of the Early Cretaceous-Miocene shark Scapanorhynchus
  †Scapanorhynchus
  - †Scapanorhynchus texanus
- †Scaphites
  - †Scaphites hippocrepis
  - †Scaphites iris
- †Schizosporis
  - †Schizosporis parvus
  - †Schizosporis reticulatus
- †Sclerorhynchus
  - †Sclerorhynchus pettersi
- †Scoyenia
- Segestria – tentative report
- †Semionotus
  - †Semionotus brauni
- †Serphites
  - †Serphites navesinkae – type locality for species
  - †Serphites raritanensis – type locality for species
- Serpula
  - †Serpula pervermiformis
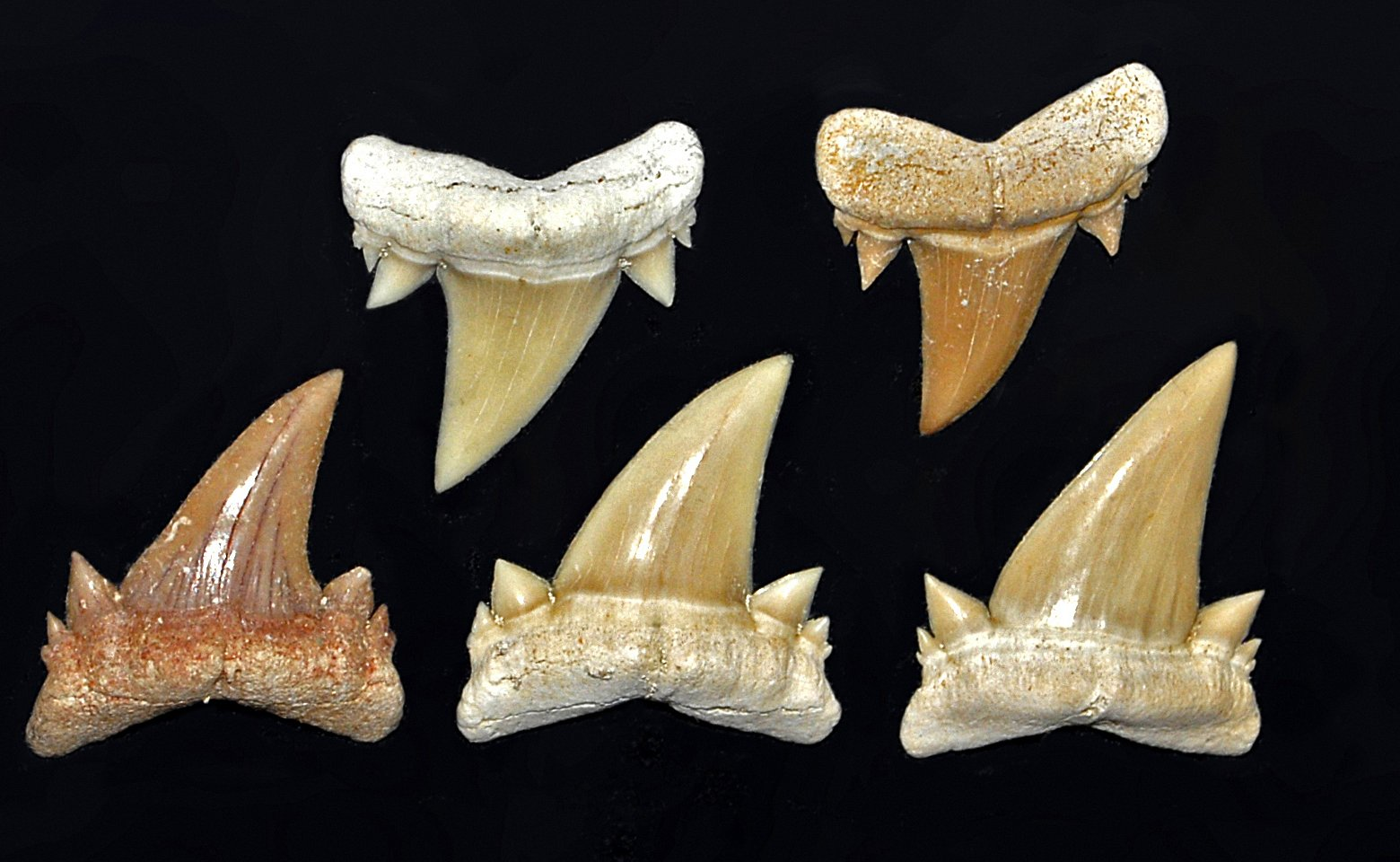
- Fossilized teeth of the Cretaceous-Eocene shark Serratolamna
  †Serratolamna
  - †Serratolamna serrata
- †Solicoccus – type locality for genus
  - †Solicoccus nascimbenei – type locality for species
- †Solyma
  - †Solyma elliptica
  - †Solyma lineolatus
- †Spathopria – type locality for genus
  - †Spathopria sayrevillensis – type locality for species
- †Sphagnumsporites
  - †Sphagnumsporites australis – or unidentified comparable form
  - †Sphagnumsporites clavus
  - †Sphagnumsporites psilatus
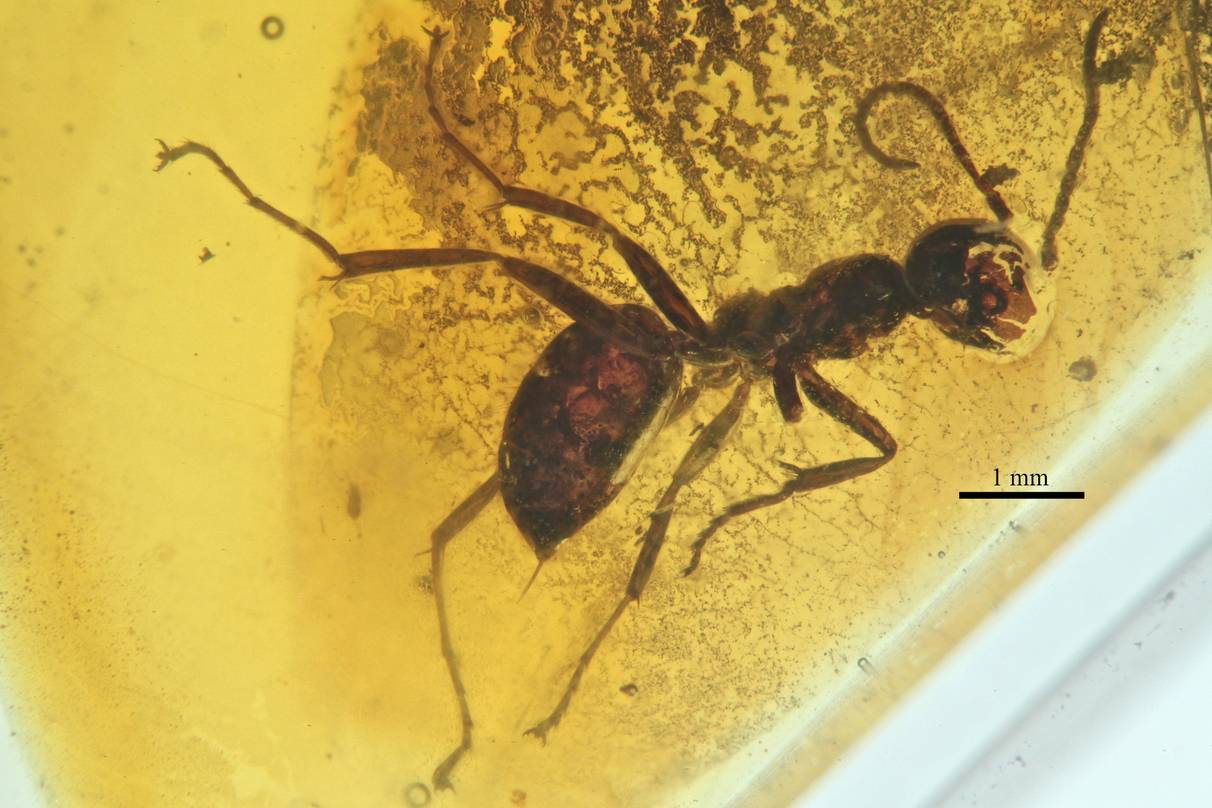
- Amber-entombed specimen of the Late Cretaceous ant Sphecomyrma
  †Sphecomyrma – type locality for genus
  - †Sphecomyrma freyi – type locality for species
  - †Sphecomyrma mesaki – type locality for species
- †Sphenodiscus
  - †Sphenodiscus lobatus
- Spondylus
  - †Spondylus echinata
  - †Spondylus gregalis
- Squalicorax
  - †Squalicorax kaupi
  - †Squalicorax pristodontis
  - †Squalicorax pristodontus
- Squatina
  - †Squatina hassei
- †Stantonella
- †Stegobium
  - †Stegobium raritanensis – type locality for species
- †Stegomus
  - †Stegomus arcuatus
- †Steingelia
  - †Steingelia cretacea – type locality for species
- †Stephandous
- †Stephanodus
- †Steropoides
  - †Steropoides ingens
- †Stilobezzia
  - †Stilobezzia kurthi – type locality for species
- †Stolamissus – type locality for genus
  - †Stolamissus mirabilis – type locality for species
- Striarca
  - †Striarca congesta
  - †Striarca saffordi
- †Striaticostatum
  - †Striaticostatum sparsum
- †Symmorphus – tentative report
  - †Symmorphus senex – type locality for species
- †Syncyclonema
  - †Syncyclonema conradi
  - †Syncyclonema simplicius
- †Syneucoila – type locality for genus
  - †Syneucoila magnifica – type locality for species
- †Synodontaspis
  - †Synodontaspis hardingi
  - †Synodontaspis holmdelensis
- †Synorichthys
  - †Synorichthys stewarti – or unidentified comparable form

== T ==
- †Tagsmiphron – type locality for genus
  - †Tagsmiphron ascalaphus – type locality for species
  - †Tagsmiphron gigas – type locality for species
  - †Tagsmiphron muesebecki – type locality for species
- †Tanytrachelos
  - †Tanytrachelos ahynis
- †Taphrosaurus
  - †Taphrosaurus lockwoodi
- †Taphrosphys
  - †Taphrosphys nodosus – type locality for species
  - †Taphrosphys strenuus – type locality for species
  - †Taphrosphys sulcatus – type locality for species
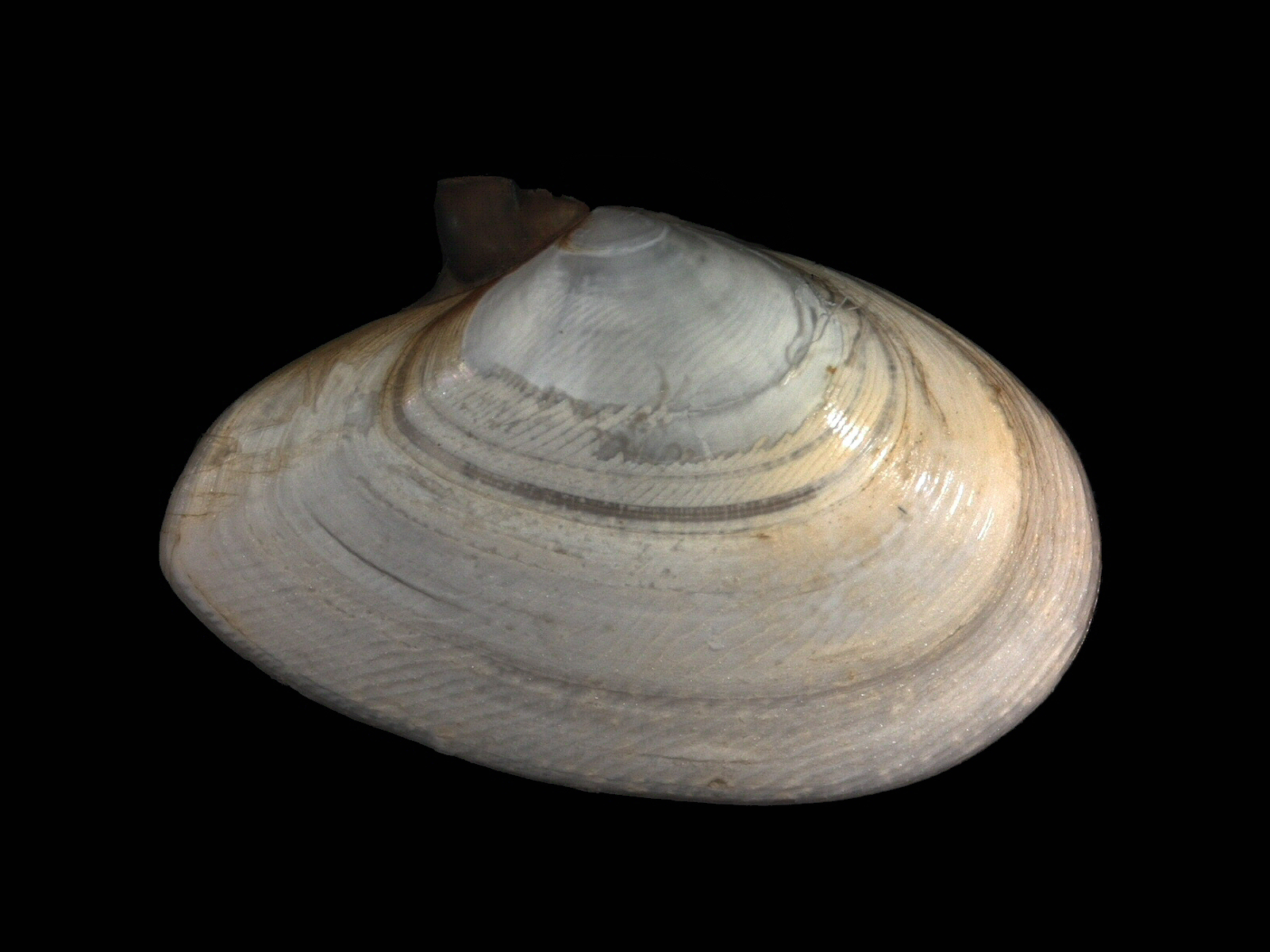
- Shell of a Tellina, or tellin
  Tellina
  - †Tellina eborea
- †Tellinimera
  - †Tellinimera buboana
  - †Tellinimera eborea
  - †Tellinimera gabbi
- †Telmatornis – type locality for genus
  - †Telmatornis priscus – type locality for species
- Tenagodus
  - †Tenagodus biplicata
- †Tenea
  - †Tenea parilis
  - †Tenea pinguis
- †Terabratulina
  - †Terabratulina cooperi
- †Tethepomyia – type locality for genus
  - †Tethepomyia thauma – type locality for species
- †Tetracarcinus
  - †Tetracarcinus subquadratus
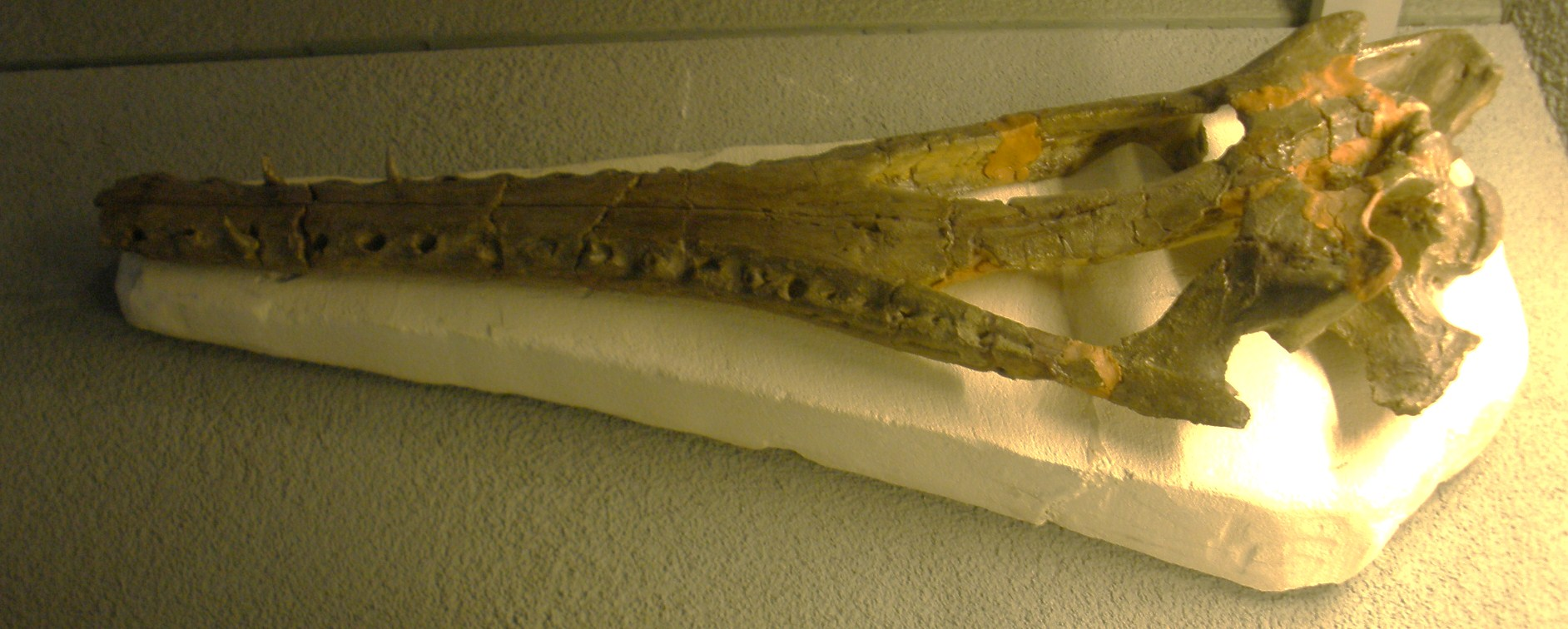
- Fossilized skull of the Late Cretaceous-Paleocene gavial relative Thoracosaurus
  †Thoracosaurus
  - †Thoracosaurus glyptodon – type locality for species
  - †Thoracosaurus neocesariensis – type locality for species
- †Todisporites
  - †Todisporites major
  - †Todisporites minor
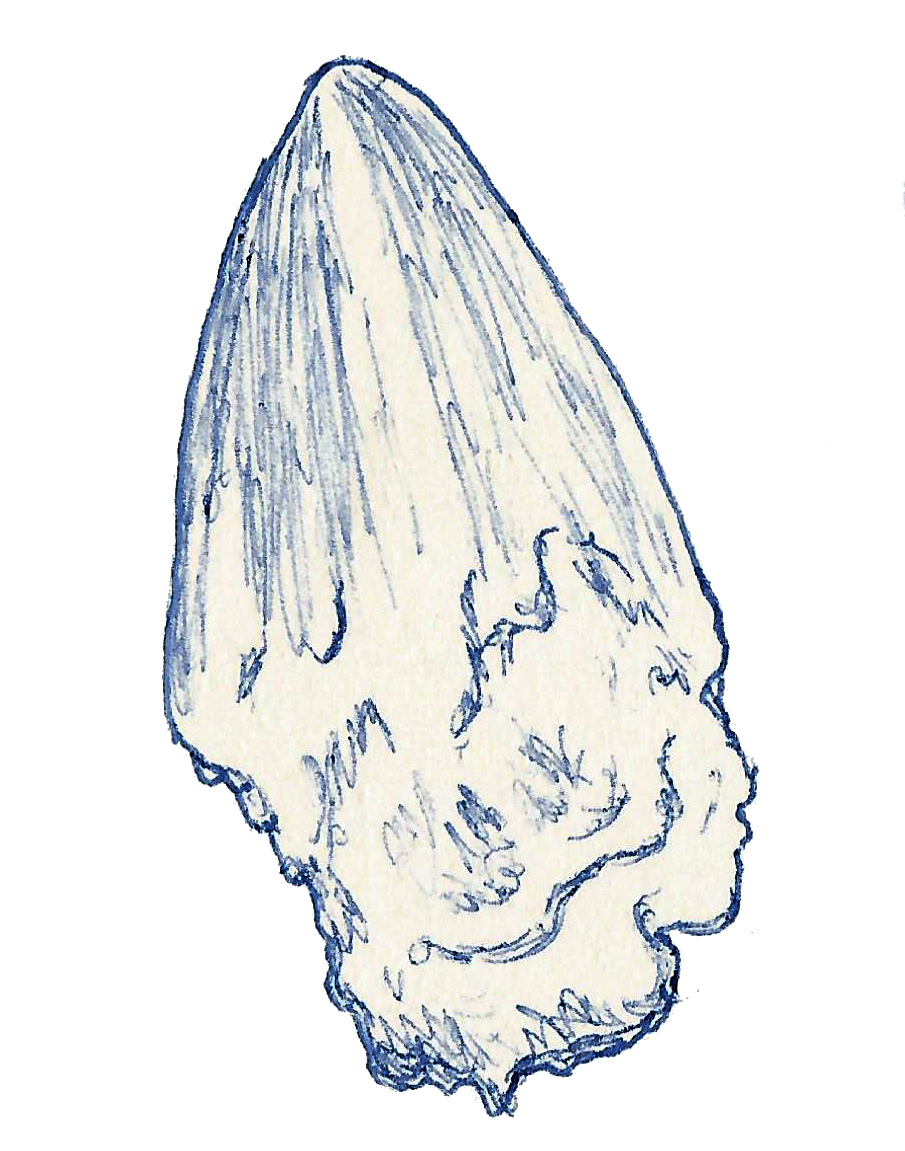
- Illustration of a fossilized tooth of the dubious Late Cretaceous reptile genus Diplotomodon
  †Tomodon – type locality for genus
  - †Tomodon horrificus – type locality for species
- Trachycardium
  - †Trachycardium eufaulensis
  - †Trachycardium longstreeti
  - †Trachycardium multiradiatum
  - †Trachycardium tenuistriatum
- †Trachyscaphites
  - †Trachyscaphites pulcherrimus
- †Trachytriletes
  - †Trachytriletes ancoraeformis – or unidentified comparable form
- †Tricolpites
  - †Tricolpites balmei – type locality for species
  - †Tricolpites heusseri – type locality for species
  - †Tricolpites reticulatus – or unidentified comparable form
  - †Tricolpites wilsonii – type locality for species
- †Trigonarca
  - †Trigonarca cuneiformis
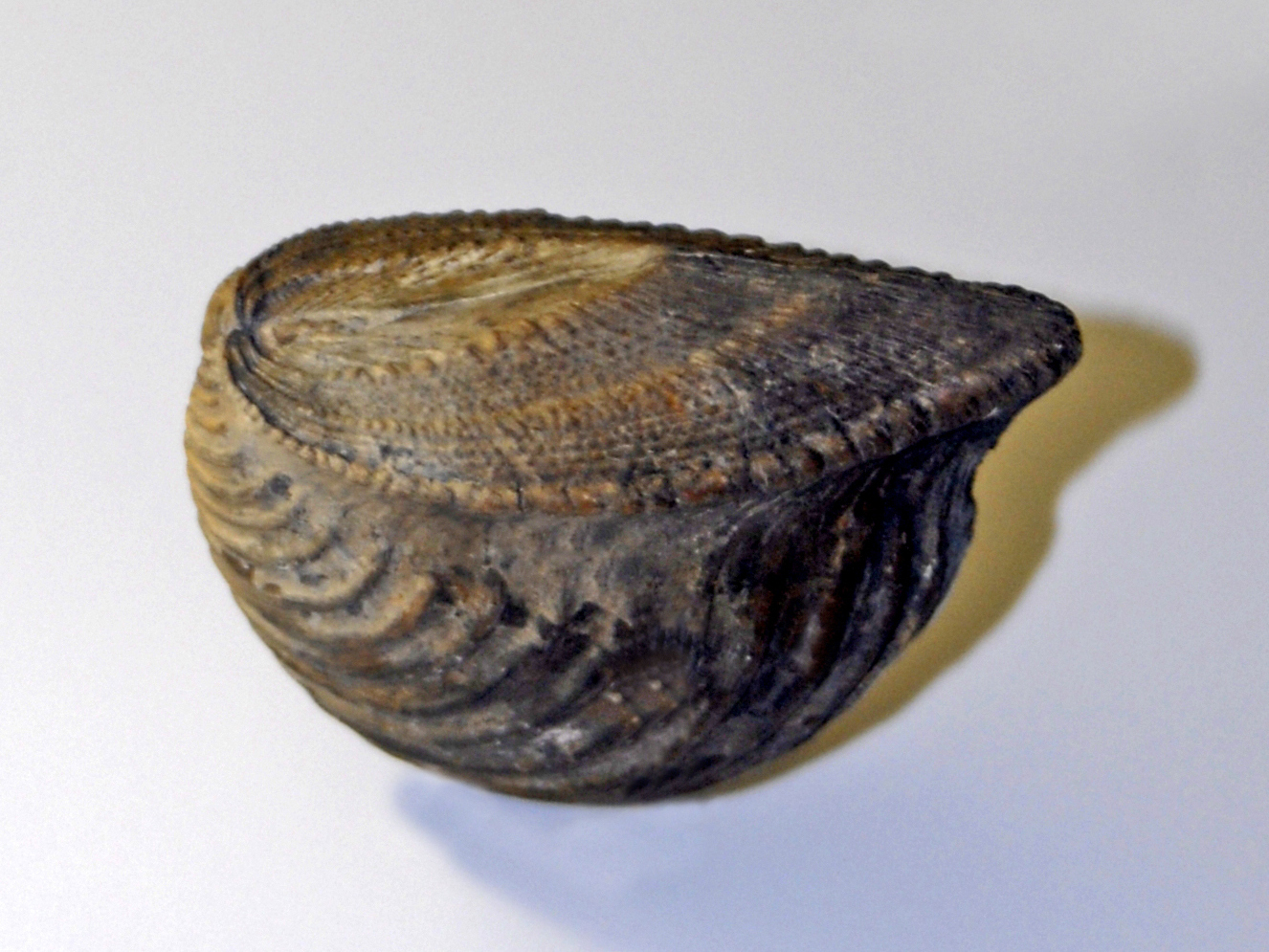
- Fossilized shell of the Permian-Paleocene marine bivalve Trigonia
  †Trigonia
  - †Trigonia cerulia
  - †Trigonia enfaulensis
  - †Trigonia mortoni
- †Triletes
- Trionyx
  - †Trionyx halophilus
- †Trochoceramus
  - †Trochoceramus proobliqua
- Trochocyathus
  - †Trochocyathus balanophylloides
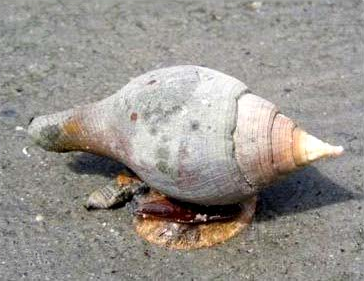
- A living Turbinella, or chank
  Turbinella
  - †Turbinella intermedia
- †Turbinopsis
  - †Turbinopsis curta
- Turbonilla
  - †Turbonilla laqueata
- †Turonempis – type locality for genus
  - †Turonempis styx – type locality for species
- †Turonicoccus – type locality for genus
  - †Turonicoccus beardsleyi – type locality for species
  - †Turonicoccus grimaldii – type locality for species
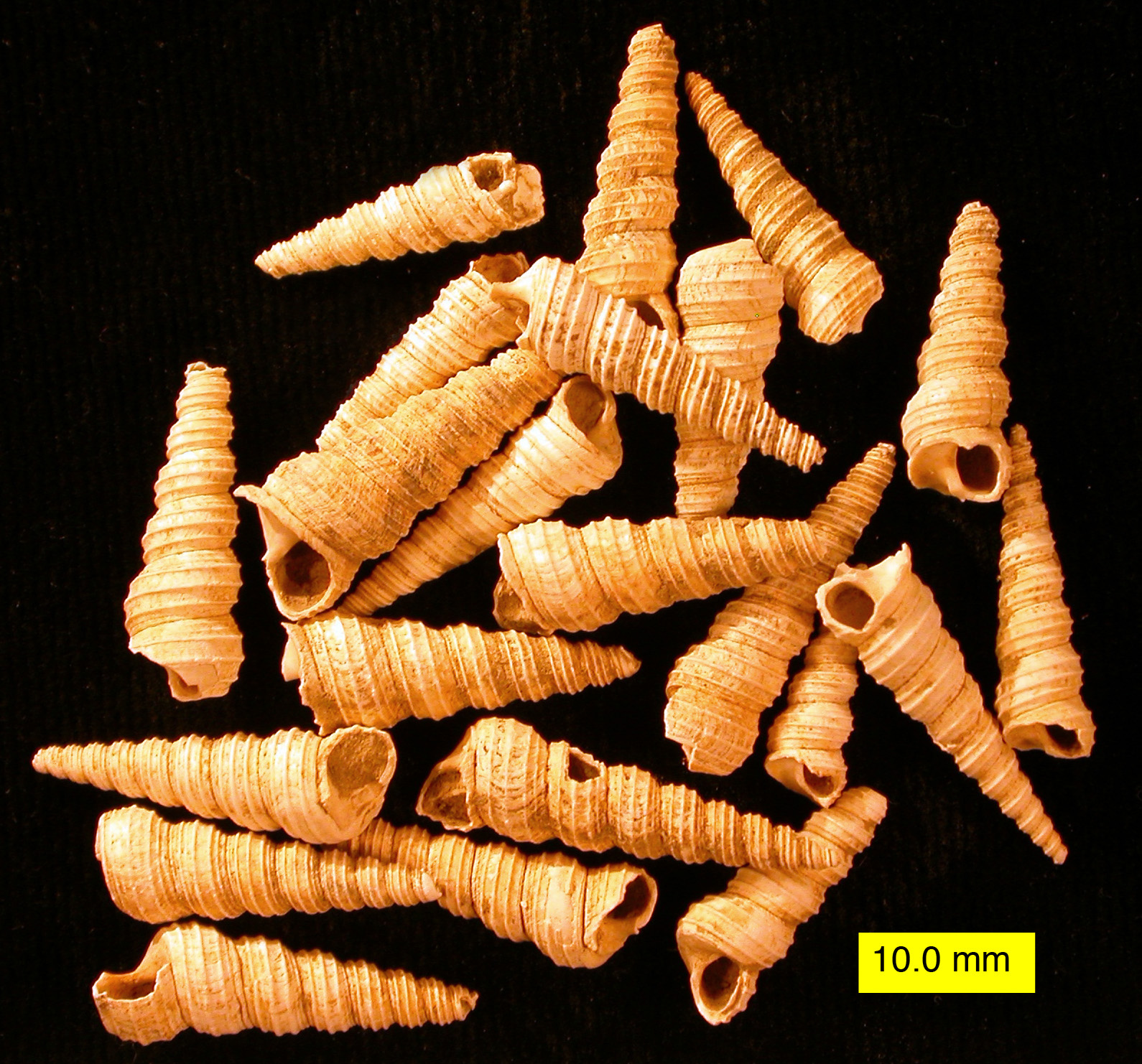
- Fossilized shells of the Late Jurassic-modern tower snail Turritella
  Turritella
  - †Turritella bakeri
  - †Turritella bilira
  - †Turritella encrinoidea
  - †Turritella encrinoides
  - †Turritella hardemanensis
  - †Turritella jerseyensis
  - †Turritella marshalltownensis
  - †Turritella merchantvillensis
  - †Turritella trilira
  - †Turritella vertebroides
- †Turseodus

== U ==
- †Ulmipollenites
  - †Ulmipollenites undulosus – or unidentified comparable form
- †Umbonicardium
  - †Umbonicardium umbonatum
- †Unicardium
- †Urceolabrum
  - †Urceolabrum tuberculatum

== V ==
- †Veniella
  - †Veniella conradi
  - †Veniella elevata
  - †Veniella trapezoidea
- †Vetericardiella
  - †Vetericardiella crenalirata
- †Vianagramma – type locality for genus
  - †Vianagramma goldmani – type locality for species
- †Vianathauma – type locality for genus
  - †Vianathauma pericarti – type locality for species
- †Volutoderma
  - †Volutoderma biplicata
- †Volutomorpha
  - †Volutomorpha conradi
  - †Volutomorpha ponderosa
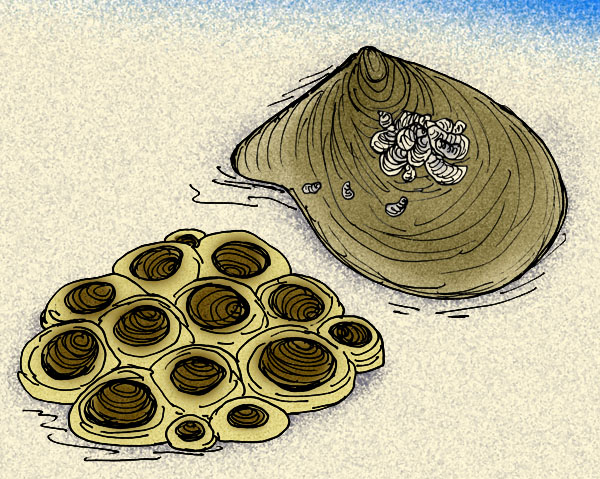
- Life restorations of the Late Cretaceous marine bivalve Volviceramus
  †Volviceramus
  - †Volviceramus involutus
- Vulsella – or unidentified comparable form
  - †Vulsella monmouthensis

== W ==
- †Wilsonisporites – type locality for genus
  - †Wilsonisporites woodbridgei – type locality for species
- †Wormaldia
  - †Wormaldia praecursor – type locality for species

== X ==
- Xanthosia
  - †Xanthosia elegans
- †Xenosycorax – type locality for genus
  - †Xenosycorax engeli – type locality for species
- †Xenotrichomyia – type locality for genus
  - †Xenotrichomyia newjerseyiensis – type locality for species
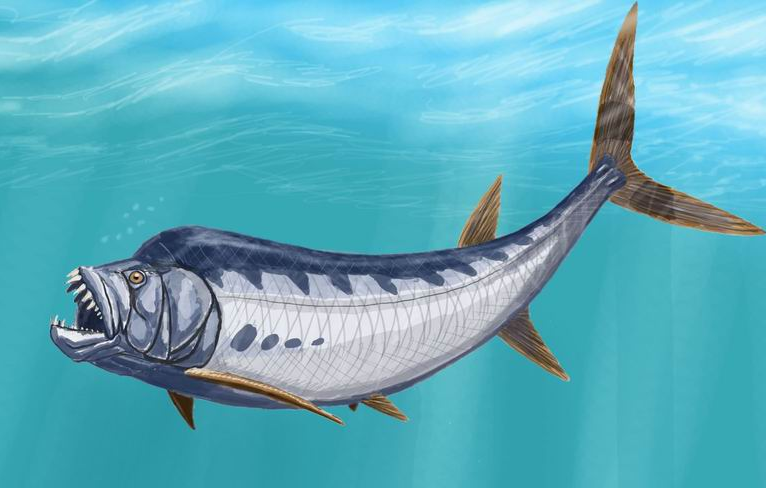
- Life restoration of the Cretaceous bony fish Xiphactinus
  †Xiphactinus
  - †Xiphactinus audax
  - †Xiphactinus vetus
