= List of fossiliferous stratigraphic units in New Jersey =

This article contains a list of fossil-bearing stratigraphic units in the state of New Jersey, U.S.

== Sites ==
Group or Formation	Period	Notes
Aquia Formation	Paleogene	
Beekmantown Group/Stonehenge Formation	Ordovician	
Boonton Formation	Jurassic	
Cape May Formation		
Chatham Group/Passaic Formation	Triassic	
Coeymans Limestone	Devonian	
Feltville Formation	Jurassic	
Hornerstown Formation	Paleogene, Cretaceous	
Hornerstown Marls	Paleogene	
Kirkwood Formation	Neogene	
Leithsville Formation	Cambrian	
Lower Hornerstown Formation	Paleogene	
Magothy Formation	Cretaceous	
Manasquan Formation	Paleogene	
Manasquan Group/Vincentown Formation	Paleogene	
Marcellus Formation	Devonian	
Marshalltown Formation	Cretaceous	
Matawan Formation	Cretaceous	
Matawan Group/Marshalltown Formation	Cretaceous	
Matawan Group/Wenonah Formation	Cretaceous	
Matawan Group/Woodbury Formation	Cretaceous	
Merchantville Formation	Cretaceous	
Meriden Group/Towaco	Jurassic	
Matawan Formation	Cretaceous	
Monmouth Group/Mount Laurel Formation	Cretaceous	
Monmouth Group/Navesink Formation	Cretaceous	
Monmouth Group/New Egypt Formation	Cretaceous	
Monmouth Group/Wenonah Group/Mt. Laurel Formation	Cretaceous	
Mount Laurel Formation	Cretaceous	
Navesink Formation	Cretaceous	
Navesink Group	Cretaceous	
New Egypt Formation	Cretaceous	
Newark Group/Lockatong Formation	Triassic	
Newark Group/Passaic Formation	Triassic	
Newark Group/Stockton Formation	Triassic	
Passaic Formation	Triassic	
Potomac Group/Raritan Group/Magothy Formation	Cretaceous	
Rancocas Group/Hornerstown Formation	Paleogene	
Rancocas Group/Vincentown Formation	Paleogene	
Raritan Formation	Cretaceous	
Sandy Hook Formation	Cretaceous	
Shark River Formation	Paleogene	
Shark River Marl	Paleogene	
South Amboy Fire Clay Group/Raritan Formation	Cretaceous	
Stockton Formation	Triassic	
Tinton Formation	Cretaceous	
Vincentown Formation	Paleogene	
Woodbury Formation	Cretaceous	

== See also ==
- Paleontology in New Jersey
