= Monmouth Group =

- Stratigraphic range: Late Santonian to late Maastrichtian, 84–66.5 Ma
- Type: Group
- Sub-units: See text
- Underlies: Rancocas Group
- Overlies: Magothy Formation

Lithology
- Primary: Marl, glauconite

Location
- Region: New Jersey, Pennsylvania, New York, Delaware, Maryland
- Country: United States

The Monmouth Group or Matawan Group is a major Late Cretaceous-aged geologic group in the eastern United States, known from New Jersey, Pennsylvania, New York, Delaware, and Maryland. It comprises a number of geological formations dating from the Santonian to nearly the end of the Maastrichtian, deposited in nearshore environments off the coast of eastern Appalachia, including deltaic and marine ecosystems. It is highly fossiliferous and preserves a diverse array of fossils, including some of the most prominent dinosaur-bearing deposits of eastern North America.

The following formations are included, from youngest to oldest:

- New Egypt Formation (=Tinton Formation) (youngest, late Maastrichtian)
- Red Bank Formation
- Navesink Formation
- Severn Formation
- Mount Laurel Formation
- Wenonah Formation
- Marshalltown Formation (=Matawan Formation)
- Englishtown Formation (=Matawan Formation)
- Woodbury Formation
- Merchantville Formation (=Matawan Formation) (oldest, late Santonian to early Campanian)

== See also ==
- List of fossiliferous stratigraphic units in New Jersey
- Paleontology in New Jersey
- Black Creek Group & Selma Group, two other similarly-aged geologic groups from eastern North America
