= Rancocas Group =

New Jersey geologic group

- Stratigraphic range: latest Maastrichtian to Thanetian, 66.5–57 Ma
- Type: Group
- Sub-units: Hornerstown Formation, Vincentown Formation
- Underlies: Manasquan Formation
- Overlies: Monmouth Group

Location
- Region: New Jersey
- Country: United States

The Rancocas Group is a geologic group in New Jersey. It preserves fossils dating back to the latest Cretaceous and the Paleogene period, meaning that it spans the Cretaceous-Paleogene boundary. It contains the Hornerstown Formation and the Vincentown Formation, with some treatments also including the Manasquan Formation within it.

== See also ==
- List of fossiliferous stratigraphic units in New Jersey
- Paleontology in New Jersey
