= Sandy Hook Formation =

- Stratigraphic range: Maastrichtian ~66.0–72.1 Ma
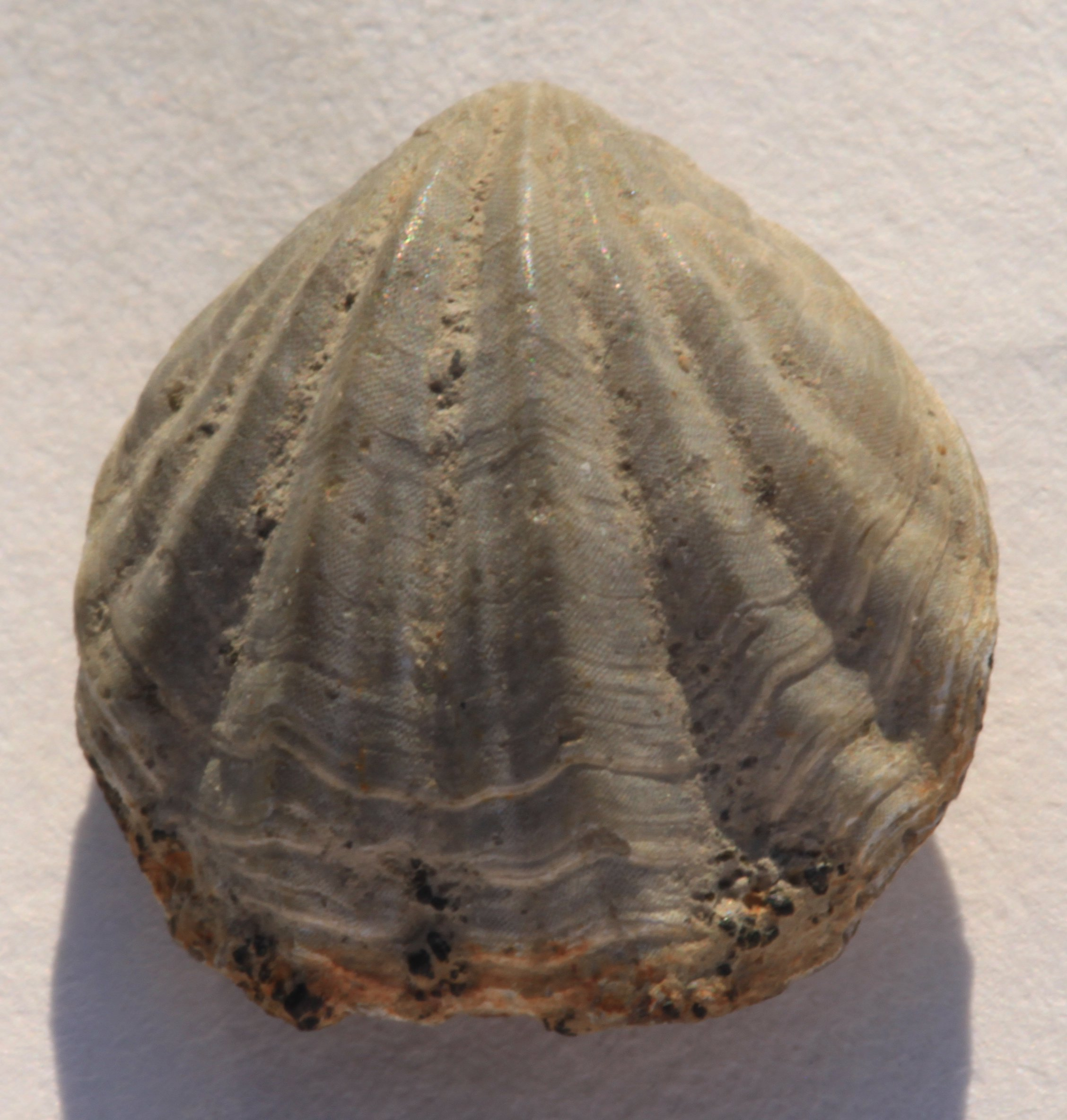
- An Choristothyris plicata, lampshell, collected at Navesink Formation, near Poricy Brook, New York
- Type: Geological formation
- Unit of: Monmouth Group
- Underlies: Tinton Formation
- Overlies: Navesink Formation
- Area: 100 miles (160 km) then an additional 100 fathoms (180 m) into the Atlantic Ocean

Lithology
- Primary: Sand, quartz, massive, dark-gray, fossiliferous, feldspar, muscovite, chlorite, and biotite are minor sand constituents

Location
- Coordinates: 40.399429°N 73.976639°W
- Region: Atlantic coastal plain of the Coastal Province of North America
- Country: United States
- Extent: Monmouth County, New Jersey

Type section
- Named for: Sandy Hook, New Jersey
- Location: Sandy Hook, New Jersey
- Coordinates: 40.4°N 74.0°W
- Approximate paleocoordinates: 40.6°N 49.5°W
- Region: New Jersey
- Country: United States
- Thickness at type section: up to 40 feet (10 m)

The Sandy Hook Formation or Red Bank Formation is a geologic formation in New Jersey. It preserves fossils dating back to the Cretaceous period.

== See also ==
- List of fossiliferous stratigraphic units in New Jersey
- Paleontology in New Jersey
