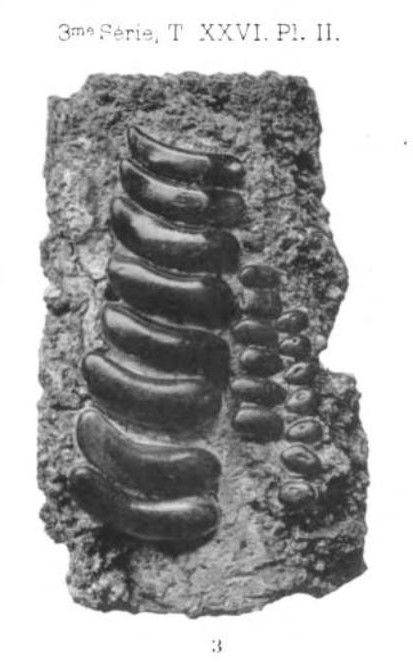
- Fossil tooth plate of A. subclavatus

Scientific classification
- Kingdom: Animalia
- Phylum: Chordata
- Class: Actinopterygii
- Order: †Pycnodontiformes
- Family: †Pycnodontidae
- Genus: †Anomoeodus; Forir, 1887

Type species
- †Pycnodus subclavatus Agassiz, 1833

Species
- ~25+, see text

= Anomoeodus =

Anomoeodus Temporal range: Albian–latest Maastrichtian Possible Danian record

Extinct genus of fishes

Anomoeodus is an extinct genus of prehistoric marine ray-finned fish belonging to the family Pycnodontidae. This genus primarily lived during the mid-to-late Cretaceous period, ranging from the Albian to the very end of the Maastrichtian age, and possibly into the Danian. The first fossils of Anomoeodus were described by Louis Agassiz in 1833, although they were described under Pycnodus. Some studies have recovered it as a wastebasket taxon.

In the United States, fossil teeth of the widespread species A. phaseolus are colloquially referred to as "drum fish" teeth due to their close resemblance to those of modern drumfish. However, they are unrelated to actual drumfish, which only appeared during the Cenozoic.

== Distribution ==
Anomoeodus had a wide geographic distribution, with fossils found in France, Belgium, the Netherlands, Spain, Egypt, Uzbekistan, and the United States. Remains of the species A. subclavatus are known from the Campanian of the Kristianstad Basin in Sweden, making it one of the northernmost-occurring pycnodont taxa. This northwards migration may be associated with the warming temperatures of the time.

A. phaseolus teeth are known from the Main Fossiliferous Layer (MFL) of the Hornerstown Formation in New Jersey, which records a mass mortality event during the Cretaceous-Paleogene extinction event, likely just after the Chicxulub impact. As it is located slightly above the Cretaceous-Paleogene boundary, it is technically in the very earliest Danian. In any case, their presence indicates that Anomoeodus existed up until the Cretaceous/Paleocene boundary, and these fossils represent the latest records for the taxon. A single tooth is located slightly above the boundary, which may indicate that Anomoeodus survived further into the early Danian, but this tooth may have been reworked from earlier layers.

== Description ==
Like many members of its family, Anomoeodus had strong jaws and teeth adapted for crushing hard prey, making it mainly durophagous. Its diet is believed to have consisted primarily of crustaceans and mollusks.

Diagnostic features of this genus include teeth that are generally spherical, kidney-shaped, or elliptical, as well as the presence of four tooth rows in a jaw.

== Species ==
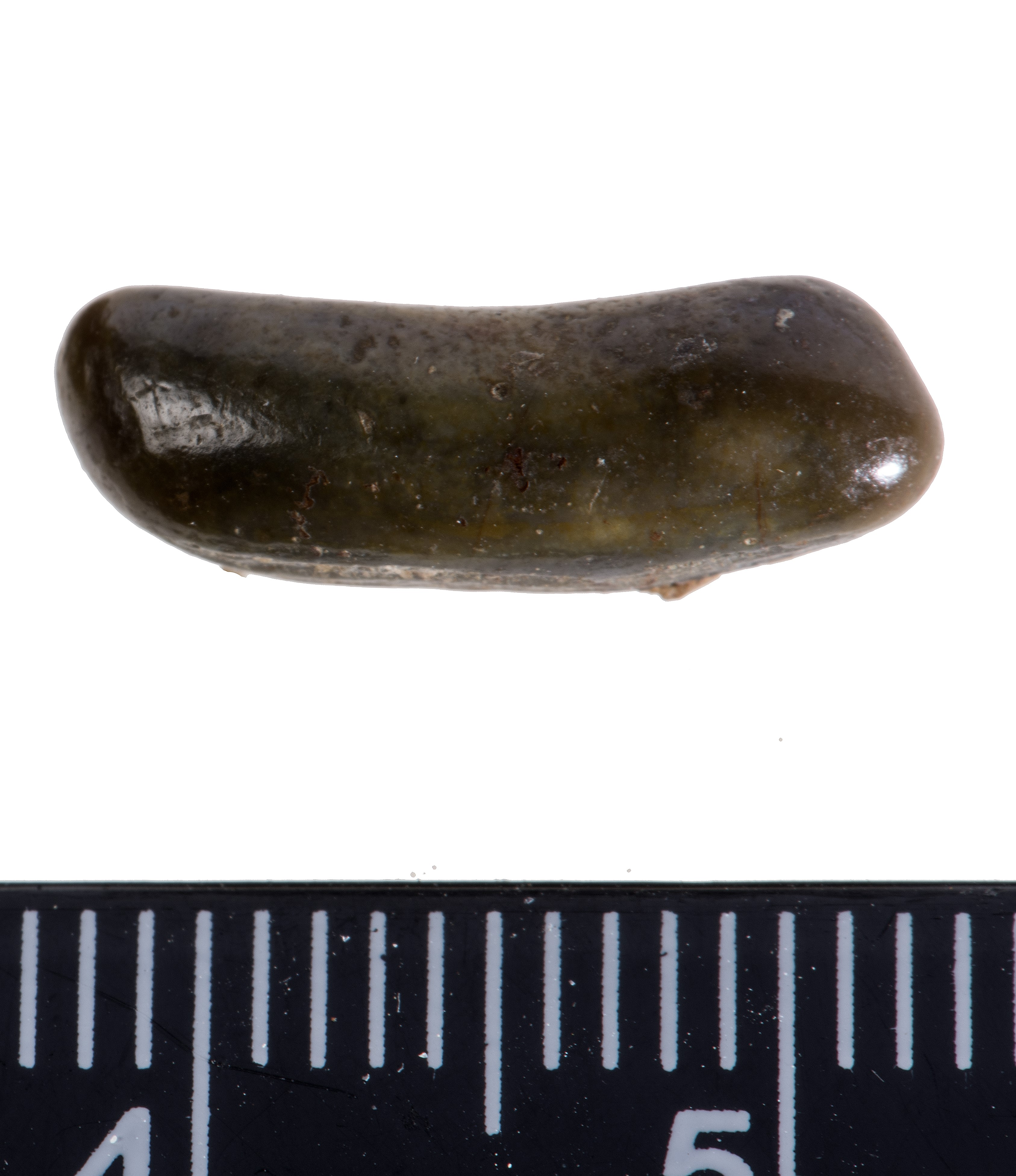
Tooth of A. muensteri

The following species are known:

- A. aegypticus Capasso et al., 2021 - Maastrichtian of Egypt (Dakhla Formation)
- A. angustus (Agassiz, 1844) - Cenomanian of the United Kingdom (English Chalk), Czech Republic and Germany (Hesseltal Formation) (syn: Pycnodus cretaceus Agassiz, 1844, P. elongatus Agassiz, 1844, P. rhomboidalis Agassiz, 1844, P. subdeltoideus Reuss, 1845)
- A. aulercus (Sauvage, 1872)
- A. carteri Woodward, 1895 - Cenomanian of England (Cambridge Greensand)
- A. cenomanicus (Sauvage, 1872)
- A. caddoi Suarez et al., 2021 - Albian of Arkansas, US (Holly Creek Formation)
- A. confertus Woodward, 1895 - Cenomanian of England (Cambridge Greensand)
- A. couloni (Agassiz, 1843) - Late Cretaceous of Europe (nomen dubium)
- A. cottreaui Priem, 1912
- A. disparilis (Cornuel, 1877) - Early Cretaceous of France (nomen dubium)
- A. distans (Coquand, 1860) - Late Cretaceous of France
- A. fraiponti Forir, 1889 - Maastrichtian of the Netherlands (Maastricht Formation)
- A. hunteri
- A. latidens Gidley, 1913 - Campanian to Maastrichtian of Maryland (Monmouth Group), Mississippi, & New Jersey (Navesink Formation), US
- A. mississippiensis Gidley, 1913 - Cretaceous of Mississippi, US
- A. muensteri (Agassiz, 1834) - Cenomanian of Germany (Hesseltal Formation) (syn: Pycnodus depressus Agassiz, 1844, P. complanatus Agassiz, 1844)
- A. obliquus (Pictet & Campiche, 1858) - Albian of Switzerland (nomen dubium)
- A. pauciseriale - Kriwet, 2002 - Cenomanian of England (English Chalk)
- A. phaseolus (Hay, 1899) - Coniacian to Maastrichtian/Danian boundary of Delaware (Marshalltown Formation), Georgia (Blufftown & Cusseta Formations), Maryland (Severn Formation), Mississippi (Eutaw Formation), New Jersey (Marshalltown, Mount Laurel, Wenonah, Navesink & Hornerstown Formations) North Carolina (Tar Heel & Bladen Formations), and South Carolina (Donoho Creek Formation), US (syn: Pycnodus faba Leidy, 1872)
- A. robustus (Leidy, 1857) - Early Cretaceous of France
- A. sculptus (Cornuel, 1877) (syn: Pycnodus imitator Cornuel, 1877) - Early Cretaceous of France
- A. splendidus Nessov, 1985 - Cenomanian of Uzbekistan (Khodzhakul Formation)
- A. subclavatus (Agassiz, 1844) (type species) - Campanian of Sweden (Kristianstad Basin), Maastrichtian of the Netherlands & Belgium (Maastricht Formation)
- A. superbus Woodward, 1893 - Cenomanian of England (Cambridge Greensand)
- A. teneidaensis Marzouk et al., 2026 - Maastrichtian of Egypt (Dakhla Formation)
- A. willetti Woodward, 1893 - Cenomanian of England (English Chalk)
- A. wolfi Capasso, 2020 - Cenomanian of Texas (Del Rio Formation)
- A. woodwardi Sauvage, 1898 - Cretaceous of Portugal

The majority of these species are only known from isolated dental elements. Only a few species (A. angustus, A. willetti, A. subclavatus, A. pauciseriale) are known from more than just teeth.

Cooper & Martill (2020) determined that a diagnostic feature of Anomoeodus is the presence of 4 tooth rows, excluding several former species. The former species A. barberi has been reclassified into the genus Agassizilia due to having more than 5 tooth rows, and the former species "A" nursalli Kriwet, 1999 is now considered an indeterminate pycnodontid due to having 6 tooth rows. Further taxonomic revisions are likely required for this genus.

== Fossil record ==
Fossils of Anomoeodus have been found in marine deposits from the Late Cretaceous period. In North America, they have been found in the Niobrara Formation in Wyoming and South Dakota, and the Eagle Ford Formation in Texas. In Europe, Anomoeodus fossils have been found in the Upper Cretaceous strata of Spain, Belgium, the Netherlands, France, and Uzbekistan. In Africa, fossils have been found in Egypt and Morocco.

== Paleoecology ==
Anomoeodus lived in a variety of marine environments, from shallow coastal waters to deeper offshore environments. It is believed to have been a relatively common component of Cretaceous marine faunas. Some species (such as A. caddoi) are believed to have been able to tolerate estuarine environments, while others are only known from offshore marine deposits. It is generally thought to have been a reef fish.

In addition to its role as a predator of crustaceans and mollusks, Anomoeodus likely served as a prey item for larger marine predators, such as mosasaurs and sharks. The thick scales and heavily armored head of Anomoeodus likely provided some protection from predation, although it is unknown how effective this defense mechanism was in practice.

== See also ==
- Prehistoric fish
- List of prehistoric bony fish
