= New Egypt Formation =

Geological formation in New Jersey

- Stratigraphic range: Late Maastrichtian; ~69–67 Ma
- Type: Geological formation
- Unit of: Monmouth Group
- Underlies: Hornerstown Formation
- Overlies: Navesink Formation

Lithology
- Primary: Marl
- Other: Sandstone, claystone

Location
- Coordinates: 40.3°N 74.1°W
- Approximate paleocoordinates: 37.9°N 41.5°W
- Region: New Jersey
- Country: United States

Type section
- Named for: New Egypt, New Jersey
- New Egypt Formation (the United States) New Egypt Formation (New Jersey)

The New Egypt Formation is a Late Cretaceous (late Maastrichtian-aged) geologic formation of the Monmouth Group in New Jersey, United States.

== Description ==
The basal New Egypt is a massive clayey, glauconitic marl that closely resembles the Navesink Formation into which it grades below. Ammonites and other invertebrates found at the Spheno Run site correlate well with the middle Severn Formation of Maryland. Spheno Run has so far produced a remarkable number of vertebrate specimens, especially from marine reptiles, including: carapace elements from at least two species of turtles, Peritresius ornatus and Taphrosphys sulcatus; various bone elements from at least two species of mosasaurs including a sizable fragment of dentary bone from Prognathodon rapax and numerous shed teeth from Mosasaurus maximus.

Vertebrate remains also include material from sharks, particularly teeth and unusually large vertebral centra from an individual lamniform shark Squalicorax pristodontus, bony fish, and, rarely, dinosaurs. In addition to the vertebrate collection, Spheno Run also yields an abundance of invertebrate species including: twenty-two bivalves, seven gastropods, six cephalopods, and one each of echinoidea, porifera, and scaphopoda. It is rare to find such an extensive array of both vertebrate and invertebrate species within one horizon in New Jersey.

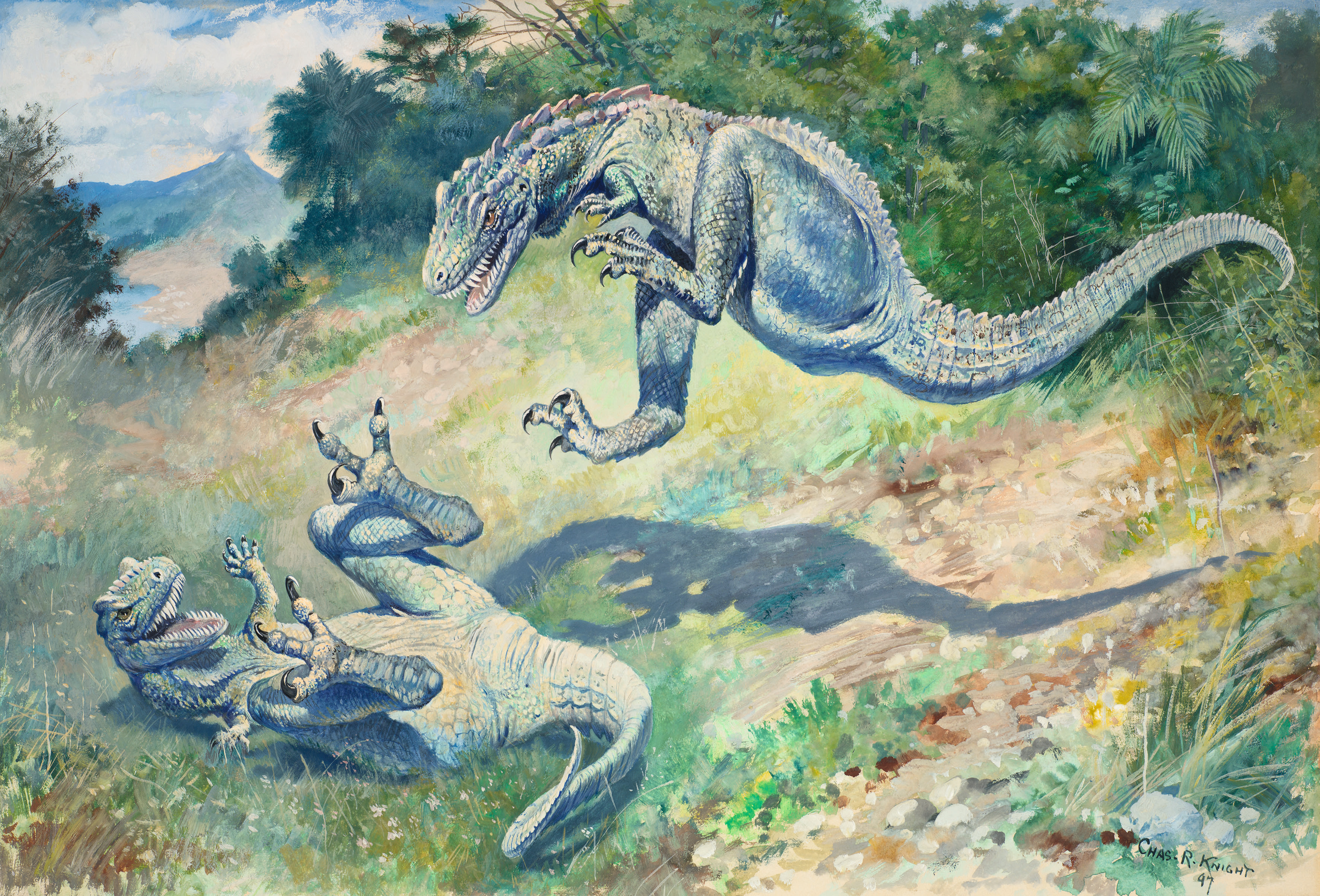
The famous painting Leaping Laelaps was inspired by Dryptosaurus remains found in the New Egypt Formation.

The New Egypt Formation preserves the most complete late Maastrichtian-aged dinosaur fauna from the eastern United States, providing an important record of the dinosaurs that inhabited Appalachia around this time. These remains belong to dinosaurs whose carcasses were washed out to sea, and preserve evidence of being submerged in water and scavenged by sharks & marine invertebrates. The most notable taxon from this formation is the tyrannosauroid Dryptosaurus, one of the few predatory theropods known from eastern North America. In addition, remains of indeterminate hadrosaurs, including potential lambeosaurines, are also known. The potential presence of lambeosaurines is notable, as very few other remains are known from eastern North America, and is not thought to have still inhabited North America so late into the Maastrichtian.

== Vertebrate paleobiota ==
=== Cartilaginous fish ===
The following taxa are known:

==== Chimaeras ====
Chimaeras of the New Egypt Formation
Genus	Species	Member	Location	Material	Notes	Images	Images
Edaphodon	E. mirificus			Barnsboro, Blackwood Terrace		A callorhinchid chimaera.	
Leptomylus	L. forfex			Barnsboro		A chimaeriform of uncertain affinities.	

==== Sharks ====
Sharks of the New Egypt Formation
Genus	Species	Member	Location	Material	Notes	Images
Brachaelurus	B. hornerstownensis	Shrewsbury	Arneytown	1 tooth	A blind shark. Type locality for species.	
Chiloscyllium	C. sp.	Shrewsbury	Arneytown	1 tooth	A bamboo shark.	
Cretalamna	C. appendiculata	Shrewsbury	Arneytown	1 tooth	A megatooth shark.	
Ginglymostoma	G. cuspidata	Shrewsbury	Arneytown	3 teeth	A nurse shark. Type locality for species.	
Hemiscyllium	H. sp.	Shrewsbury	Arneytown	1 tooth	A bamboo shark.	
Proheterodontus	P. creamridgensis	Shrewsbury	Arneytown	1 tooth	A bullhead shark. Type locality for species.	
Pseudodontaspis	P. cf. herbsti	Shrewsbury	Arneytown	1 tooth	A sand shark.	
Scapanorhynchus	S. texanus		Blackwood Terrace		A goblin shark.	
Serratolamna	S. serrata	Shrewsbury	Arneytown	1 tooth	A serratolamnid mackerel shark.	
Squalicorax	S. kaupi	Shrewsbury	Arneytown	1 tooth	A crow shark.	
Squalicorax	S. pristodontus		Spheno Run, Blackwood Terrace		A crow shark.	
Squatina	S. hassei	Shrewsbury	Arneytown	4 teeth	An angelshark.	

==== Rays ====
Rays of the New Egypt Formation
Genus	Species	Member	Location	Material	Notes	Images
Dasyatis	D. newegyptensis	Shrewsbury	Arneytown	3 teeth	A whiptail stingray. Type locality of species.	
Ischyrhiza	I. mira		Blackwood Terrace		An sawskate.	
Protoplatyrhina	P. renae	Shrewsbury	Arneytown	1 tooth	A hypsobatid ray.	
Ptychotrygon	P. sp.	Shrewsbury	Arneytown	1 tooth	A ptychotrygonid sawskate.	
Rhinobatos	R. casieri	Shrewsbury	Arneytown	2 teeth	A guitarfish.	
Rhombodus	R. binkhorsti	Shrewsbury	Arneytown	2 teeth	A rhombodontid ray.	
Rhombodus	R. laevis	Shrewsbury	Arneytown	1 tooth	A rhombodontid ray.	
Sclerorhynchus	S. pettersi	Shrewsbury	Arneytown	2 rostra pieces	A sclerorhynchid sawskate.	

=== Ray-finned fish ===
Actinopterygii of the New Egypt Formation
Genus	Species	Member	Location	Material	Notes	Images	Images
Anomoeodus	A. phaseolus		Blackwood Terrace			A pycnodont.	

=== Reptiles ===
==== Dinosaurs ====
Dinosaurs of the New Egypt Formation
Genus	Species	Member	Location	Material	Notes	Images
Dryptosaurus	D. aquilunguis		Barnsboro	Incomplete skeleton	A tyrannosauroid theropod, type locality of genus and species. One of the most complete theropod skeletons known from eastern North America.	
"Hadrosaurus"	"H." minor		Barnsboro		A small-sized hadrosaurid ornithischian. Nomen dubium.	
?Lambeosaurinae indet.			Barnsboro	Partial forelimb	A hadrosaur bone potentially referable to a lambeosaurine. Notable for representing one of the only potential records of this group from eastern North America, and one of the latest records of this group from North America overall.	

==== Crocodylomorphs ====
Crocodylomorphs of the New Egypt Formation
Genus	Species	Member	Location	Material	Notes	Images
Hyposaurus	H. rogersii		Barnsboro		A dyrosaurid.	

==== Turtles ====
Turtles of the New Egypt Formation
Genus	Species	Member	Location	Material	Notes	Images
Agomphus	A. pectoralis		Barnsboro		A kinosternoid related to the hickatee.	
Euclastes	E. wielandi		Barnsboro		A pancheloniid sea turtle.	
Osteopygis	O. emarginatus		Barnsboro		A macrobaenid.	
Peritresius	P. ornatus		Spheno Run		A pancheloniid sea turtle.	
Taphrosphys	T. nodosus		Barnsboro, Spheno Run		A bothremydid side-necked turtle.	
Taphrosphys	T. sulcatus		Barnsboro, Spheno Run		A bothremydid side-necked turtle.	

==== Squamates ====
Squamates of the New Egypt Formation
Genus	Species	Member	Location	Material	Notes	Images
Mosasaurus	M. hoffmanni (=M. dekayi)		Barnsboro, Spheno Run		A mosasaurine mosasaur.	
Prognathodon	P. rapax		Barnsboro, Spheno Run		A mosasaurine mosasaur.	
Russellosaurina indet.			Barnsboro		A russellosaurine mosasaur.	

=== Invertebrate fossils ===
Bivalves

- Cucullaea vulgaris

Cephalopods

- Baculites ovatus

== See also ==
- Paleontology in New Jersey
