= Hornerstown Formation =

Geological Formation in New Jersey

- Stratigraphic range: latest Maastrichtian-Danian; 66.5–62 Ma
- Type: Geological formation
- Unit of: Rancocas Group
- Underlies: Vincentown Formation
- Overlies: New Egypt Formation, Navesink Formation and Tinton Formation

Lithology
- Primary: Marl, greensand

Location
- Region: New Jersey
- Country: United States

Type section
- Named for: Hornerstown, New Jersey

The Hornerstown Formation is a latest Cretaceous to early Paleocene-aged geologic formation in New Jersey. It preserves a variety of fossil remains, including those of dinosaurs, and contains direct evidence of the mass mortality that occurred at the Cretaceous-Paleogene boundary.

Outcrops of the Hornerstown Formation are known from sites such as Edelman Fossil Park.

== Age & significance ==
The age of the Hornerstown deposits have been controversial. While most fossils are of animal taxa known from the earliest Cenozoic era, several fossils of otherwise exclusively Cretaceous age have been found. These include remains of the shark Squalicorax, several types of non-avian dinosaurs, the teleost fish Enchodus, several species of ammonite, and marine lizards referred to the genus Mosasaurus. Some of these remains show signs of severe abrasion and erosion, however, implying that they may be re-worked from older deposits. Most of these fossils are restricted to the lowest point in the formation, one rich in fossils and known as the Main Fossiliferous Layer, or MFL. Other explanations for the out-of-place fossils in the MFL is that they represent a time-averaged assemblage that built up and remained unburied during a time of low sediment deposition, or that they were stirred up from deeper in the sediment and deposited together during a tsunami. Biochemical analyses done on mosasaur bones from the Hornerstown Formation and the underlying, purely Cretaceous New Egypt Formation have found differing chemical signatures in the content of rare earth elements depending on whether the bones derive from the New Egypt or the Hornerstown Formation. This provides evidence against the idea that the presence of these remains in the Hornerstown is just the result of reworking, and supports the Hornerstown Formation including Cretaceous strata.

To account for these Cretaceous fossils, the Hornerstown Formation is generally treated as including the last portion of the Maastrichtian shortly before the Cretaceous-Paleogene boundary, and is thus divided into three sections: the section below the MFL (entirely Maastrichtian), the MFL itself (at the K-Pg boundary), and the section above the MFL (entirely Danian). However, other studies continue to treat the Hornerstown Formation as a Paleocene formation that saw significant reworking of Cretaceous fossils into itself. In addition, recent studies have found evidence of high iridium concentration and shocked quartz within the MFL, suggesting that the MFL represents a thanatocoenosis formed from an ecosystem collapse during the Cretaceous-Paleogene extinction event. This makes the Hornerstown Formation one of the few geological formations to contain direct evidence of the immediate impact of the extinction event. The Hornerstown Formation is important paleontologically, as it shows the impact of the K-Pg extinction on the coastal waters of eastern Appalachia, contains many of the last known records of taxa that went extinct at the K-Pg boundary, while also providing evidence of survivorship for the taxa that managed to survive the extinction event.

== Vertebrate paleofauna ==
=== Cartilaginous fishes ===
Based on Case (1996) and Boles et al (2024):

==== Chimaeras ====
Chimaeras of the Hornerstown Formation
Genus	Species	Location	Stratigraphic position	Abundance	Material	Notes	Images
Edaphodon	E. agassizi		Danian		Tooth plates	A callorhinchid chimaera.	
Edaphodon	E. mantelli		Danian		Tooth plates	A callorhinchid chimaera.	
Edaphodon	E. mirificus		Maastrichtian		Tooth plates	A callorhinchid chimaera.	
Edaphodon	E. stenobyrus		Maastrichtian		Tooth plates	A callorhinchid chimaera.	
Ischyodus	I. bifurcatus		Maastrichtian, potentially Danian		Tooth plates, jaw elements	A callorhinchid chimaera.	
Ischyodus	I. thurmanni		Maastrichtian		Tooth plates, jaw elements	A callorhinchid chimaera.	
Ischyodus	I. williamsae		Danian		Tooth plates, jaw elements	A callorhinchid chimaera.	

==== Sharks ====
Sharks of the Hornerstown Formation
Genus	Species	Location	Stratigraphic position	Abundance	Material	Notes	Images
Araloselachus	A. cuspidatus		Maastrichtian		Teeth	A sand shark.	
Carcharias	C. teretidens		Danian		Teeth	A relative of the sand tiger shark.	
Cretalamna	C. appendiculata		Maastrichtian & Danian		Teeth	A megatooth shark.	
Heptranchias	H. howellii		Maastrichtian		Teeth	A relative of the sharpnose sevengill shark.	
Hexanchus	H. microdon		Danian		Teeth	A sixgill shark.	
Hexanchus	H. sp.		Maastrichtian & Danian		Teeth	A sixgill shark.	
Otodus	O. obliquus		Danian		Teeth	A megatooth shark.	
Odontaspis	O. sp.		Danian		Teeth	A sand shark.	
Palaeocarcharodon	P. sp.		Danian		Teeth	A megatooth shark.	
Palaeogaleus	P. vincenti		Maastrichtian & Danian		Teeth	A houndshark.	
Palaeohypotodus	P. rutoti		Danian		Teeth	A sand shark.	
Pseudocorax	P. affinis		Maastrichtian		Teeth	A pseudocoracid shark.	
Scapanorhynchus	S. texanus		Maastrichtian		Teeth	A goblin shark.	
Scyliorhinus	S. gilberti		Danian		Teeth	A catshark.	
Sphenodus	S. lundgreni		Maastrichtian		Teeth	A orthacodontid shark.	
Squalicorax	S. pristodontus		Maastrichtian		Teeth	A crow shark.	
Squalus	S. minor		Maastrichtian & Danian		Teeth	A spurdog.	
Squalus	S. sp		Maastrichtian & Danian		Teeth	A spurdog.	
Squatina	S. sp.		Maastrichtian		Teeth	An angelshark.	
Weltonia	W. ancistrodon		Danian		Teeth	A cow shark.	
Xampylodon	X. brotzeni		Maastrichtian		Teeth	A cow shark.	

==== Rays ====
Rays of the Hornerstown Formation
Genus	Species	Location	Stratigraphic position	Abundance	Material	Notes	Images
Aetomylaeus	A. striatus		Maastrichtian		Teeth	An eagle ray.	
Dasyatis	D. crosswickense		Danian		Teeth	A whiptail stingray. Type locality for species.	
Hypolophites	H. hutchinsi		Danian		Teeth	A whiptail stingray. Type locality for species.	
Hypolophodon	H. sylvestris		Danian		Teeth	A whiptail stingray.	
Ischyrhiza	I. mira		Maastrichtian		Teeth	A sclerorhynchid sawskate.	
Rhinoptera	R. sp.		Maastrichtian		Teeth	A cownose ray.	
Rhombodus	R. laevis		Maastrichtian		Teeth	A rhombodontid ray.	
Viperecucullus	V. kuehnei		Danian		Teeth	A whiptail stingray, type locality for the species and genus.	

=== Ray-finned fishes ===
Actinopterygii of the Hornerstown Formation
Genus	Species	Location	Stratigraphic position	Abundance	Material	Notes	Images
Acipenser	A. cf. albertensis		Maastrichtian			A sturgeon.	
Anomoeodus	A. phaseolus		Maastrichtian, potentially Danian		8 teeth	A pycnodont. One tooth is known from the Danian section of the formation, which would be the latest record of this genus and prove its occurrence in the Cenozoic; however, it may have been reworked from lower layers.	
Atractosteus	A. sp.		Maastrichtian & Danian		11 teeth	A gar. First record of gars from eastern North America during the Paleocene.	
cf. Bananogmius	cf. B. sp.		Maastrichtian			A plethodid tselfatiiform.	
Dercetidae indet.			Maastrichtian & Danian		27 flank scales	A dercetid aulopiform. The first evidence in eastern North America of the Dercetidae surviving the K-Pg extinction event.	
Enchodus	E. ferox		Maastrichtian			An enchodontid aulopiform. The E. gladiolus remains are the first record of the species in eastern North America.	
Enchodus	E. gladiolus		Maastrichtian		8 teeth	An enchodontid aulopiform. The E. gladiolus remains are the first record of the species in eastern North America.	
Iridopristis	I. parrisi	Sewell, New Jersey	Danian		3 partial articulated specimens, including a near-complete skull.	A stem-lineage member of Holocentridae. The earliest known definitive holocentrid. Type locality for genus and species.	
Paralbula	P. marylandica		Maastrichtian & Danian		23 teeth	A phyllodontid elopomorph. First evidence of P. marylandica existing during the Cretaceous, indicating that it survived the extinction event.	
Phyllodus	P. paulkatoi		Maastrichtian		1 tooth plate	A phyllodontid elopomorph. First known occurrence in eastern North America.	
Saurocephalus	S. lanciformis		Danian		1 tooth	A saurodontid ichthyodectiform. First known occurrence in eastern North America and first known occurrence of ichthyodectiforms as a whole in the Paleocene and Cenozoic.	

=== Reptiles ===
==== Birds ====
A number of fossil birds are known from the greensands of the formation. The Hornerstown serves as the type locality for all these genera and species:

Birds of the Hornerstown Formation
Genus	Species	Location	Stratigraphic position	Abundance	Notes
Anatalavis	A. rex		?earliest Paleocene		A waterfowl potentially related to the magpie-goose.
Graculavus	G. velox		?earliest Paleocene		A potential wader.
Laornis	L. edwardsianus		?earliest Paleocene		A laornithid wading bird.
Novacaesareala	N. hungerfordi		?earliest Paleocene		A potential tropicbird.
Palaeotringa	P. littoralis		?earliest Paleocene		A potential wader.
Palaeotringa	P. vagans		?earliest Paleocene		A potential wader.
Telmatornis	T. priscus		?earliest Paleocene		A potential wader.
Tytthostonyx	T. glauconiticus		?earliest Paleocene		A potential seabird.

==== Non-avian dinosaurs ====
Dinosaurs of the Hornerstown Formation
Genus	Species	Location	Stratigraphic position	Abundance	Notes
Hadrosauridae indet.			Maastrichtian		A hadrosaurid ornithischian.

The tyrannosauroid Dryptosaurus is sometimes referred to this formation, as its remains were found in the New Egypt Formation, which is sometimes considered a part of the Hornerstown.

==== Crocodylomorphs ====
Crocodylomorphs of the Hornerstown Formation
Genus	Species	Location	Stratigraphic position	Abundance	Material	Notes	Images
Borealosuchus	B. threeensis		Maastrichtian		Lower jaw, postcranial remains	A eusuchian. Type locality of species.	
Bottosaurus	B. harlani		Maastrichtian & Danian		Remains including lower jaw of a juvenile individual	An early caiman.	
Bottosaurus	B. tuberculatus		Maastrichtian		Remains including lower jaw of a juvenile individual	An early caiman.	
Hyposaurus	H. rogersii		Maastrichtian & Danian			A dyrosaurid.	
cf. Procaimanoidea	P. sp.		Maastrichtian			A caiman.	
Thoracosaurus	T. neocesariensis		Maastrichtian & Danian			A gavialoid.	

==== Plesiosaurs ====
Plesiosaurs of the Hornerstown Formation
Genus	Species	Location	Stratigraphic position	Abundance	Material	Notes	Images
"Plesiosaurus"	"P." brevifemur		Maastrichtian			An indeterminate plesiosaur known from a well-documented specimen, now lost.	

==== Turtles ====
Testudines of the Hornerstown Formation
Genus	Species	Location	Stratigraphic position	Abundance	Notes	Images
Adocus	A. agilis		Maastrichtian		An adocid.	
Adocus	A. beatus		Maastrichtian		An adocid.	
Adocus	A. syntheticus		Maastrichtian		An adocid.	
Agomphus	A. pectoralis		Maastrichtian		A kinosternoid related to Dermatemys.	
Bothremys	B. sp.		Maastrichtian		A bothremydid side-necked turtle.	
Euclastes	E. wielandi		Maastrichtian & Danian		A sea turtle.	
Lytoloma	L. jeanesii		Maastrichtian		A sea turtle.	
Osteopygis	O. emarginatus		Maastrichtian		A macrobaenid.	
Peritresius	P. ornatus		Maastrichtian		A sea turtle.	
Taphrosphys	T. sulcatus		Maastrichtian		A bothremydid side-necked turtle.	
Taphrosphys	T. strenuus		Maastrichtian		A bothremydid side-necked turtle.	

==== Mosasaurs ====
Mosasaurs of the Hornerstown Formation
Genus	Species	Location	Stratigraphic position	Abundance	Material	Notes	Images
Halisaurus	H. platyspondylus		Maastrichtian			A halisaurine. Type locality of the genus and species.	
Mosasaurus	M. hoffmanni (=Nectoportheus validus)		Maastrichtian		Pterygoid, teeth, vertebrae	A mosasaurine. This formation contains some of the last known remains, comprising individuals killed during the mass mortality event that formed the MFL. A very large specimen is known.	
Plioplatecarpus	P. sp.		Maastrichtian			A plioplatecarpine.	

== See also ==
- List of dinosaur-bearing rock formations
