= Anatalavis =

Anatalavis Temporal range: Paleocene – Eocene, 66–55 Ma

Scientific classification
- Kingdom: Animalia
- Phylum: Chordata
- Class: Aves
- Order: Anseriformes
- Suborder: Anseres
- Superfamily: Anseranatoidea
- Genus: †Anatalavis; Olson & Parris, 1987

Type species
- †Anatalavis rex (Shufeldt, 1915)

Species
- †A. rex (Shufeldt, 1915); †A. oxfordi Olson, 1999 (disputed)

Synonyms
- Nettapterornis Mlikovsky, 2002 (but see text)

Extinct genus of birds

Anatalavis is genus of prehistoric birds related to ducks and geese, perhaps to the magpie-goose (Anseranas semipalmata) in particular. Alternatively, it might have been a more basal lineage of Anserimorphae distinct from the living waterfowl, similar or even related to the roughly contemporary Conflicto antarcticus from the Danian of Antarctica.

== Species ==
The type species Anatalavis rex is known from Hornerstown, New Jersey, and its remains were collected by J.G.Meirs in 1869 and W.Ross in 1878. They are probably from the Hornerstown Formation (Late Cretaceous or Early Paleocene, some 66 million years ago) – usually, they are assumed to be from the lower Maastrichtian layer of the Hornerstown Formation, but they might be younger and postdate the Mesozoic, or even from the slightly older Navesink Formation, as these deposits are reworked and locally mixed across the K-Pg boundary, and no exact locality data was recorded for the A. rex fossils. The remains were recognized as a new species by Robert Wilson Shufeldt in the early 20th century already, but for a long time they remained in the putative shorebird genus Telmatornis. As this species was larger than its supposed congeners T. priscus and T. affinis (which are today considered a single species), Shufeldt gave it the species name rex, Latin for "king". Its affinity to waterfowl was only recognized in 1987 by Storrs L. Olson and David C. Parris, who consequently established the genus Anatalavis, meaning "duck-winged bird", from Latin anas "duck", ala "wing" and avis "bird". A. rex is only known from two humeri (holotype YPM 902 of a right wing, and paratype YPM 948 of a left wing) which are distinct and characteristic even though they lack the proximal end. They are not particularly large, but quite stout, and the living bird was probably similar to an average-sized dabbling duck of genus Anas in bulk. Notably, the shaft of the humerus has a pronounced curve like in living ducks; in the original humerus fossils of Telmatornis little of the shaft was preserved, but eventually a more complete specimen was discovered, and its straight shaft is quite unlike that of Anatalavis.

Some 80 years after A. rex, a second species Anatalavis oxfordi was described by Olson, based on fossils found in the earliest Eocene (Ypresian age, about 55 mya) London Clay Bed A at Walton-on-the-Naze, England, and named in honor of the collector Andrew Oxford of Great Mongeham, Kent, who donated the fossil for scientific research. This species is known from a partial skeleton, one of the best-preserved London Clay fossils at the time it was found, but in a delicate state of preservation and much broken. Even so, the close similarity of its humerus to the remains of the A. rex was noted. Olson at that time also erected the subfamily Anatalavinae for the genus. Jiří Mlíkovský in 2002 disagreed with uniting A. oxfordi with the considerably older A. rex and pointed out that the distal end of the humerus seems to be set at a slightly different angle relative to the bone's shaft in the two species. He thus established the genus Nettapterornis – with the same meaning as Anatalavis but in Ancient Greek, from netta (νεττα), pteron (πτερον) and ornis (ορνις) – for A. oxfordi, but this remains controversial.

== Systematics ==
A preliminary cladistic analysis in 2001 resolved A. oxfordi as a member of the group of living waterfowl, and indeed more advanced than the magpie-goose, while still retaining more ancestral traits than the slightly younger Presbyornis pervetus; the latter species, however, was the only fossil with sufficient remains for a quantitative comparison at that time. The subsequent discovery of Conflicto antarcticus, described in 2019 and also known from a wide range of fossilized bones – thus well-comparable to A. oxfordi –, only made Anatalavis more enigmatic, as it proved that archaic waterfowl whose beak was already more like that of modern ducks than that of the magpie-goose were already present soon after the end of the Mesozoic. A more comprehensive cladistic analysis conducted at that time, comparing a wide range of living and fossil waterfowl and their closest relatives, found C. antarcticus and A. oxfordi to be possibly (but with very low confidence) very closely related and together forming one distinct lineage outside the group of living waterfowl (including the magpie-goose). Thus, whether Anatalavis was indeed a member of the modern waterfowl, or belongs to a basal lineage – possibly family Conflictonidae – that evolved a filter-feeding beak in parallel to today's ducks and geese, is as unresolved as ever. The hypothesis that it is even closer to living ducks than the magpie-goose, however, seems to be an artifact of the small sample of taxa analyzed by Dyke in 1999: the 2019 analysis rejects it with some confidence, even though it cannot exclude it at a high level of certainty.
