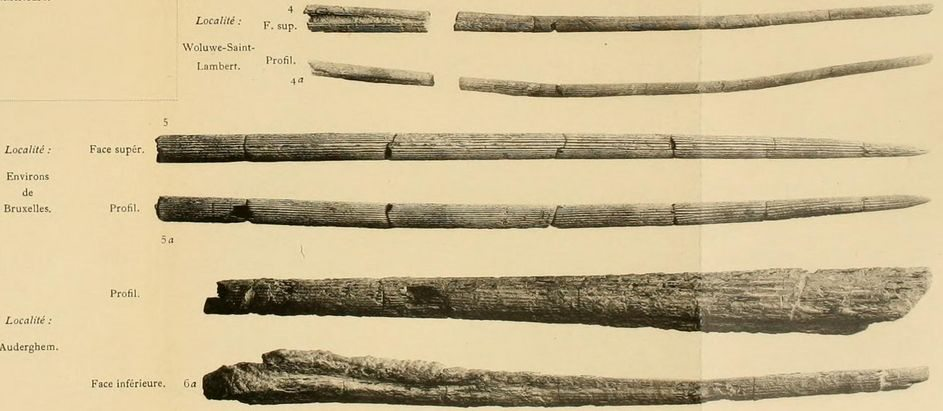
- C. rectus spines from Belgium

Scientific classification
- Kingdom: Animalia
- Phylum: Chordata
- Class: Actinopterygii
- Genus: †Cylindracanthus; Leidy, 1856

Type species
- †Coelorhynchus rectus Agassiz, 1843

Species
- See text

Synonyms
- †Coelorhynchus Agassiz, 1843

= Cylindracanthus =

Cylindracanthus Temporal range: Cenomanian to Priabonian Possible Oligocene and Miocene occurrence

Extinct genus of fishes

Cylindracanthus is an extinct, enigmatic genus of marine ray-finned fish with fossils known throughout North America, Europe, Asia and Africa from the Late Cretaceous to the late Eocene, with potential Oligocene records and a possible Miocene record also known. It is exclusively known from its distinctive partial remains, which are long cylindrical bony spines that are usually considered rostrum fragments, as well as some associated teeth. These spines are abundant & widespread throughout this timespan, and are useful indicators of a nearshore marine environment, but the taxonomic identity of the fish is still highly uncertain and debated.

== Taxonomy ==
Most of the earlier-described species in this genus were previously classified in Coelorhynchus, a genus which was later found to be preoccupied by the alternative name of an extant grenadier fish (now known as Coelorinchus), so they were reclassified into Cylindracanthus.

Cylindracanthus was originally considered a billfish, possibly related to Blochius, due to a presumed similarity in rostral spines, and was thus suggested to be the earliest billfish in the fossil record. However, later studies have found to be the structure of the rostrum to be dissimilar, and it is thus unlikely to be closely related. Later, some later studies suggested closer affinities to the Acipenseriformes, based on the potential for the spines to be the only bony parts of an otherwise cartilaginous ray-finned fish akin to chondrosteans. However, this was later rejected due to the lack of osteocytes in histologically examined specimens, which resembles the condition of derived teleosts

It has been noted that the teeth of Cenozoic Cylindracanthus are much smaller than the already-small teeth of the Cretaceous Cylindracanthus, suggesting that the teeth may have been a vestigial structure that became gradually reduced over time. It is also uncertain whether the spines are really rostra, or may instead be the ray spines of a fish's fin.

In 2025, one specimen of Cylindracanthus from the London Clay was identified as actually being a rostrum of the early billfish Aglyptorhynchus.

=== Species ===
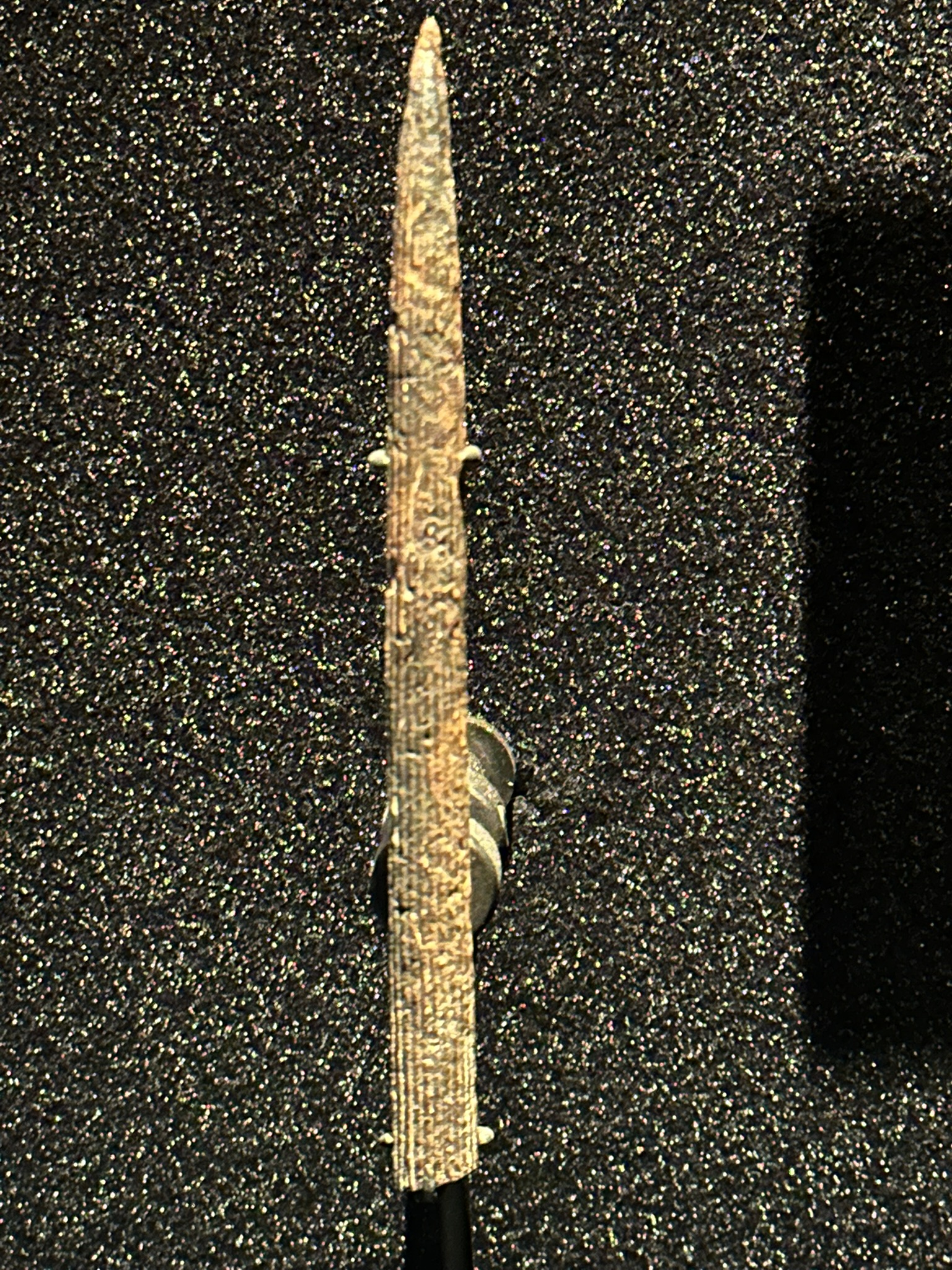
Cylindracanthus sp. spine from the Eocene of Florida, Florida Museum of Natural History

The following species are known, although the validity of many of these is uncertain:

- C. acus (Cope, 1870) - Middle Eocene (Bartonian) of Alabama (Gosport Formation) and New Jersey (Shark River Formation), USA
- C. bisulcatus Arambourg & Jolead, 1943 - Late Cretaceous (Coniacian/Santonian) of Niger
- C. cretaceus Egerton ex Dixon, 1850 - Late Cretaceous of England, Cenomanian of France, Maastrichtian of Germany & Belgium, possibly Turonian of the Democratic Republic of the Congo and middle Eocene of Germany
- C. gigas (Woodward, 1888) - Middle Eocene (Lutetian) of Egypt, and possibly Nigeria and the Democratic Republic of the Congo. The type specimen was found within the rock of the Great Sphinx.
- C. isnusris Udovichenko & Nessov, 1987 - Eocene of Uzbekistan
- C. landanensis Darteville & Casier, 1949 - middle Eocene of the Democratic Republic of the Congo (possibly a subspecies of rectus)
- C. libanicus (Woodward, 1942) - Cenomanian of Lebanon (Sannine Formation)
- C. octocostatus Casier, 1946 - Santonian of Belgium
- C. ornatus Leidy, 1856 - Late Cretaceous (Campanian) of New Jersey (Mount Laurel Formation) & North Carolina (Tar Heel Formation), USA, Maastrichtian/Paleocene of Arkansas (Arkdelphia Marl), USA, and Early Eocene & Early Oligocene of Alabama, USA (Tallahatta Formation & Red Bluff Clay) (possibly synonymous with C. rectus)
- C. rectus (Agassiz, 1843) - Early Eocene to Late Eocene (possibly Early Oligocene) of Belgium, England, Germany, France, Italy, Romania, Syria, Namibia, Morocco, Algeria, Angola, the Democratic Republic of the Congo, Nigeria, Barbados, and the United States (Alabama, Georgia, Louisiana, Maryland, Mississippi, New Jersey, North Carolina, Texas, Virginia) (=C. burtini le Hon, 1871)
- C. senegalensis Leriche, 1936 - Middle Eocene of Senegal
- C. sinuatus (Agassiz, 1844) - Early Eocene of England (nomen nudum)
- C. sulcatus (von Schafhäutl, 1863) - Middle Eocene of Germany

Some sources consider only three species to be valid: C. acus (spines more ossified and smaller tooth remains than C. ornatus), C. ornatus, and C. rectus (no bilateral symmetry in spines, unlike C. ornatus). However, some sources also synonymize C. ornatus with C. rectus.

Indeterminate remains are known from the USA (Delaware, South Carolina, Kansas and South Dakota), Mali, Togo, Ukraine, India and Pakistan.

== See also ==
- Congorhynchus - another enigmatic fossil fish known from similar remains
- Prehistoric fish
- List of prehistoric bony fish
