= Cape May Formation =

Geologic formation in New Jersey and Pennsylvania, US

- Type: Formation
- Overlies: Jamesburg Formation

Location
- Region: New Jersey, Pennsylvania
- Country: United States

Type section
- Named by: Rollin D. Salisbury

The Cape May Formation is a geologic formation in New Jersey and Pennsylvania. It preserves fossils.

The Cape May is described as "Fine-to-coarse sand, minor silt and clay; yellow, brownish-yellow, reddish-yellow, very pale brown, light gray; minor pebble gravel." It may be massive (without stratification) or stratified.

The Cape May was initially described by Rollin D. Salisbury in 1893 as an unnamed "Fourth Stage of the Yellow Gravel", with the first stage being the Beacon Hill Formation, the second being the Pensauken Formation, and the third being the Jamesburg Formation. The unnamed fourth stage was later named the Cape May by Salisbury.

== See also ==
- List of fossiliferous stratigraphic units in New Jersey
- Paleontology in New Jersey
