= South Amboy Fire Clay Group =

- Stratigraphic range: Cretaceous
- Type: Group

Location
- Region: New Jersey
- Country: United States

The South Amboy Fire Clay Group is a geologic group in New Jersey. It preserves fossils dating back to the Cretaceous period.

== See also ==
- List of fossiliferous stratigraphic units in New Jersey
- Paleontology in New Jersey
