= Palaeotringa =

Palaeotringa Temporal range: Paleocene, 66 Ma

Scientific classification
- Kingdom: Animalia
- Phylum: Chordata
- Clade: Theropoda
- Clade: Ornithurae
- Class: Aves
- Genus: †Palaeotringa; Marsh, 1870

Species
- P. littoralis Marsh, 1870 (type); P. vagans Marsh, 1872; and see text

Extinct genus of birds

Palaeotringa is a prehistoric bird genus that was discovered by O. C. Marsh during the late 19th century American Bone Wars. Its remains were found in the controversial Hornerstown Formation of New Jersey (United States) which straddles the Cretaceous-Paleocene boundary some 66 million years ago. Though it cannot be said if these birds lived before or after the Cretaceous–Paleogene extinction event, they were in all likelihood wading birds that inhabited the coasts of the northwestern Atlantic.

Two species are assigned to this genus nowadays, Palaeotringa littoralis and P. vagans. They were for some time believed to be primitive, small Gruiformes and later on placed in the form taxon "Graculavidae", the "transitional shorebirds". Though they appear to be early Charadriiformes - and may well be so, for this order seems to date back to the Cretaceous - their remains are too fragmentary for cladistic analysis to say anything more precise than that they are Neornithes like all birds alive today. Instead of being Charadriiformes, they might be some distinct but rather basal member of the Neoaves, close to the common ancestor of some or all of such birds as cranes, rails, storks and/or herons perhaps. Although their exact origin is not known, it is likely that some primitive and probably fairly small ancestral birds of these lineages were around at the end of the Cretaceous. It may be noted, however, that the Hornerstown Formation seems to contain little else but marine and seashore animals.

There exist two distal tibiotarsi from another bird species, specimens ANSP 13361 and AMNH 25221. Initially assigned to this genus too, one bone each of "Palaeotringa" vetus was found in the Hornerstown Formation and in the Maastrichtian Lance Formation in Wyoming. Later analyses concluded that they were not of a Palaeotringa and at first the bones were assigned to Telmatornis priscus. More recently, a reevaluation considered them neither close to Palaeotringa nor to Charadriiformes in general. Rather, the bones share some characters with Gruidae and Idiornithidae as well as the presbyornithid Telmabates. Much like with its erstwhile relatives, cladistic analysis is unable to resolve the affinities of this taxon for dearth of material.
