= Laornis =

Scientific classification
- Kingdom: Animalia
- Phylum: Chordata
- Class: Aves
- Family: †Laornithidae; Cracraft, 1973
- Genus: †Laornis; Marsh, 1870
- Species: †L. edvardsianus

Binomial name
- †Laornis edvardsianus Marsh, 1870

Synonyms
- Laopteryx Kurochkin, 1995 (lapsus)

Extinct genus of birds

Coordinates: 39°59′N 74°43′W

Laornis is a genus of a prehistoric neornithine birds, known only from Specimen YPM 820, a single tibiotarsus leg bone discovered in the late 19th century. Consequently, the genus is monotypic, containing only the species Laornis edvardsianus. Regarding its scientific name, Laornis means "stone bird", from Ancient Greek lao "stone" + ornis "bird". edvardsianus honors Alphonse Milne-Edwards, to compliment the French paleontologist on his landmark study Recherches Anatomiques et Paleontologiques pour servir a l'Histoire des Oiseaux Fossiles de la France, the second part of which was nearing completion at that time.

It was found in Late Cretaceous or Early Paleocene sediments of the Hornerstown Formation at the Birmingham Marl Pits, Pemberton Township, New Jersey, United States (39°59'N, 74°43'W). The deposits were laid down at approximately 66–63 Ma (million years ago).

The bone is rather distinct but not very diagnostic. Its general shape suggests that Laornis was a semi-aquatic bird with longish legs and a body at least the size of a large goose. It may have been a wading bird, in which case it stood probably around one meter (3–4 ft) tall in life, depending on how long its legs and neck were exactly, which of course cannot be determined from the one known bone. On the other hand, it might have been a larger seabird with proportionally shorter legs.

It has variously been allied with the Charadriiformes and the Gruiformes, and is tentatively placed in a family of its own, Laornithidae. It may be considered some kind of basal gruiform, or more probably part of an ancestral lineage related to the common ancestor of gruiform, charadriiform, and/or any or all other modern "wading" bird families. It might have been one of the extinct stilt-legged waterfowl of the Presbyornithidae, and it cannot even be excluded that it was an ancient pseudotooth bird, seabirds of unclear affiliation that evolved to immense proportions in the Neogene but by the time of Laornis probably were mostly the size of a large petrel.
