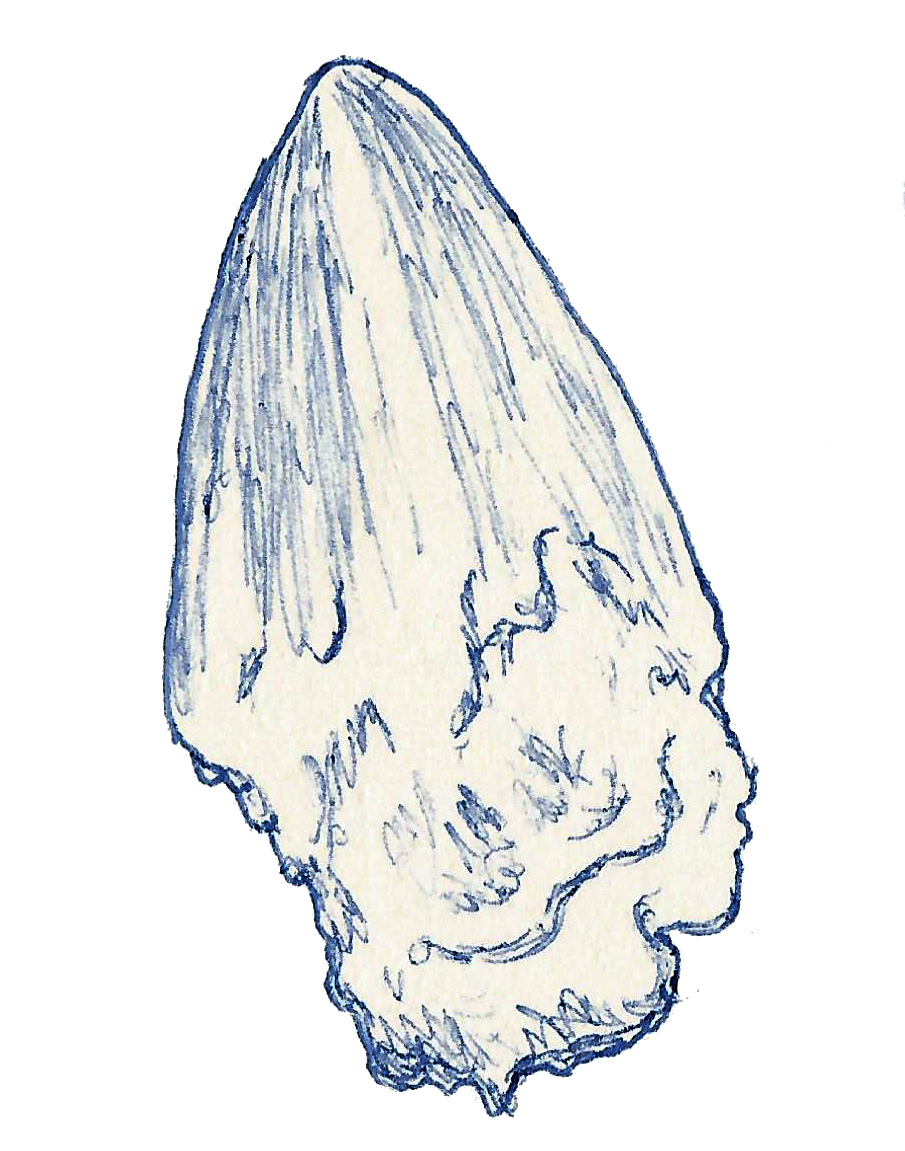
- Tooth

Scientific classification
- Domain: Eukaryota
- Kingdom: Animalia
- Phylum: Chordata
- Clade: Dinosauria
- Clade: Saurischia
- Clade: Theropoda
- Genus: †Diplotomodon; Leidy, 1868
- Species: †D. horrificus

Binomial name
- †Diplotomodon horrificus Leidy, 1865

Synonyms
- Tomodon Leidy, 1865 (preoccupied)

= Diplotomodon =

Diplotomodon Temporal range: Late Cretaceous, 70–66 Ma

Extinct genus of dinosaurs

Diplotomodon (meaning "double cutting tooth") is a dubious genus of theropod dinosaur, from New Jersey. It was possibly a member of the Tyrannosauroidea, the clade that also contains Tyrannosaurus.

Diplotomodon is only known from a single tooth, holotype ANSP 9680, found near Mullica Hill in either the Navesink or Hornerstown Formation, marine deposits dating to the Maastrichtian stage of the late Cretaceous period.

Joseph Leidy originally described the tooth using the name Tomodon in 1865, considering it a carnivorous marine reptile, probably a plesiosaur. The generic name was derived from Greek τομός (tomos), "cutting", "sharp", and ὀδών (odon), "tooth". However, this name had already been used for the snake genus Tomodon Duméril 1853 and Leidy changed it in 1868 to Diplotomodon, adding a Greek διπλόος (diploos), "double", at that time suggesting it was a fish. The type species, Diplotomodon [=Tomodon] horrificus (Leidy, 1865) Leidy 1868 is the only species in the genus that has been described. The specific name horrificus is Latin for "dreadful".

The tooth, with a preserved length of about three inches, is very broad, flat, and symmetrical and is not recurved.

In 1870 Edward Drinker Cope concluded it was not a fish but a carnivorous dinosaur. Ralph Molnar followed this up in 1990 by suggesting that it was a synonym of the tyrannosauroid Dryptosaurus. Although from then onwards mostly seen as a dinosaur, Diplotomodon was considered a member of the Mosasauridae by Halsey Wilkinson Miller in 1955. David Weishampel thought it was an indeterminate member of the Tetanurae in 2006. Today, it is generally considered a nomen dubium.

== See also ==
- Timeline of tyrannosaur research
