= Pensauken Formation =

Geologic formation in the eastern US

- Type: Formation

Location
- Region: New Jersey, Pennsylvania, Delaware, Maryland
- Country: United States

Type section
- Named by: Rollin D. Salisbury (1893)

The Pensauken Formation is a geologic formation in Delaware, Maryland, New Jersey, and Pennsylvania, of Late Tertiary age.

The Pensauken is described as "Fine-to-coarse sand, minor silt and very coarse sand; reddish-yellow to yellow; pebble gravel." It may be massive (without stratification) or stratified, and may contain crossbedding.

The Pensauken was initially described by Rollin D. Salisbury as the "Second Stage of the Yellow Gravel", with the first stage being the Beacon Hill Formation, the third being the Jamesburg Formation, and the fourth being the Cape May Formation.

The formation is named after exposures near the mouth of Pennsauken Creek in New Jersey.
