= Marshalltown Formation =

Geological Formation in the United States

- Stratigraphic range: Middle to Late Campanian, 75–72 Ma
- Type: Geological formation
- Unit of: Monmouth Group
- Underlies: Wenonah Formation
- Overlies: Englishtown Formation

Lithology
- Primary: Glauconite, sandstone
- Other: Siderite

Location
- Region: New Jersey, Delaware
- Country: United States

Type section
- Named for: Marshalltown, New Jersey

The Marshalltown Formation is a Late Cretaceous (Campanian)-aged geologic formation in New Jersey and Delaware, US. Dinosaur remains diagnostic to the genus level are among the fossils that have been recovered from the formation. It contains the most extensive Campanian-aged dinosaur fauna from New Jersey and Delaware.

The famous Ellisdale Fossil Site, a konzentrat-lagerstätten which contains one of the most diverse Cretaceous vertebrate assemblages (likely rapidly buried in a massive flood event) known from eastern North America/former Appalachia, is an exposure of this formation.

The Marshalltown Formation stretches across southern New Jersey to northern Delaware, and is largely composed of marine sediments deposited off the eastern shore of Appalachia, although the Ellisdale site represents a fluvio-deltaic or tidal-estuarine environment reminiscent of the modern Albemarle Sound, and thus has more of a terrestrial influence.

== Vertebrate paleobiota ==
Based on the Paleobiology Database:

=== Cartilaginous fish ===
Cartilaginous fish of the Marshalltown Formation
Genus	Species	Member	Location	Material	Notes	Images

=== Bony fish ===
Based on:

Bony fish of the Marshalltown Formation
Genus	Species	Member	Location	Material	Notes	Images
Acipenser	A. sp.		Ellisdale Site		A sturgeon.	
Anomoeodus	A. phaseolus		Ellisdale Site, St. Georges		A pycnodont.	
Atractosteus	A. sp.		Ellisdale Site		A gar.	
Cyclurus	C. cf. fragosus		Ellisdale Site		An amiid related to bowfins.	
cf. Cylindracanthus	C. sp.		St. George's		A fish of uncertain affinities.	
Enchodus	E. ferox		Ellisdale Site, St. Georges		An enchodontid aulopiform.	
Enchodus	E. sp.		St. Georges		An enchodontid aulopiform.	
cf. Lepisosteus	L. sp.		St. Georges		A gar.	
Paralbula	P. casei		Ellisdale Site, St. Georges		A phyllodontid elopomorph.	
cf. "Platacodon"	P. sp.		Ellisdale Site		A sciaenid-like fish.	
Stephanodus	S. sp.		St. Georges		A pycnodont.	
Xiphactinus	X. audax		Ellisdale Site		An ichthyodectid.	
Xiphactinus	X. sp.		St. Georges		An ichthyodectid.	

=== Amphibians ===
Amphibians of the Marshalltown Formation
Genus	Species	Member	Location	Material	Notes	Images
Albanerpetontidae indet.			Ellisdale Site		An albanerpetontid.	
Alytidae indet.			Ellisdale Site		An alytid frog.	
cf. Habrosaurus	H. sp.		Ellisdale Site		A sirenid salamander.	
Parrisia	P. neocesariensis		Ellisdale Site		A batrachosauroidid salamander. Type locality of genus and species.	
Pelobatidae indet.			Ellisdale Site		A relative of European spadefoot toads.	
cf. Proamphiuma	P. sp.		Ellisdale Site		A sirenid salamander.	
cf. Scotiophryne	S. sp.		Ellisdale Site		A frog of uncertain affinities.	
cf. Theatonius	T. sp.		Ellisdale Site		A frog of uncertain affinities.	

=== Reptiles ===
==== Dinosaurs ====
Based on Brownstein (2018):

Dinosaurs of the Marshalltown Formation
Genus	Species	Member	Location	Material	Notes	Images
"Coelosaurus"	C. antiquus				An ornithomimosaur.	
Coelurosauria indet.			Ellisdale Site		A coelurosaur theropod of uncertain affinities.	
Dromaeosauridae indet.			Ellisdale Site		A dromaeosaurid theropod of uncertain affinities.	
Dryptosaurus	D. sp.		Ellisdale Site		A tyrannosauroid theropod. Specimens from this formation might belong to Appalachiosaurus instead.	
Hadrosauridae indet.			Ellisdale Site		A hadrosaurid ornithopod.	
?Hadrosauroidea indet.			Ellisdale Site		A hadrosauroid ornithopod.	
Hadrosaurus	H. foulkii		Ellisdale Site		A hadrosaurid ornithopod.	
Hadrosaurus	?H. sp.		Ellisdale Site		A hadrosaurid ornithopod.	
Hypsibema	H. crassicauda		Ellisdale Site		A hadrosauroid ornithopod.	
Nodosauridae indet.			Ellisdale Site		A nodosaurid ankyosaur.	
Ornithopoda indet.			Ellisdale Site		An ornithopod of uncertain affinities.	

==== Crocodilians ====
Crocodilians of the Marshalltown Formation
Genus	Species	Member	Location	Material	Notes	Images
cf. "Allognathosuchus"	"A". sp.		Ellisdale Site		An alligatorid.	
cf. Brachychampsa	B. sp.		Ellisdale Site		An alligatorid.	
Deinosuchus	D. rugosus		Ellisdale Site		An alligatoroid, one of the largest known crocodilians. Remains of both juveniles and adults known.	
"Diplocynodon"	"D". sp.		Ellisdale Site		An alligatorid.	
"Leidyosuchus"	"L". sp.		Cambridge Crossing Executive Park		An alligatorid.	

==== Turtles ====
Turtles of the Marshalltown Formation
Genus	Species	Member	Location	Material	Notes	Images
Adocus	A. beatus			Ellisdale Site	An adocid.	
Chedighaii	C. barberi			Ellisdale Site	A bothremydid side-necked turtle.	
Corsochelys	C. sp.			Ellisdale Site	A dermochelyid sea turtle.	
Trionychidae indet.				Ellisdale Site, St. Georges	A softshell turtle of uncertain affinities.	

==== Plesiosaurs ====
Plesiosaurs of the Marshalltown Formation
Genus	Species	Member	Location	Material	Notes	Images
"Elasmosaurus"	"E." orientalis		Swedesboro	Two back vertebrae	An elasmosaurid, species name is a nomen dubium due to fragmentary nature.	

==== Squamates ====
Squamates of the Marshalltown Formation
Genus	Species	Member	Location	Material	Notes	Images
Clidastes	C. iguanavus		Swedesboro		A mosasaurine mosasaur. Type locality of species.	
Clidastes	cf. C. sp.		St. Georges		A mosasaurine mosasaur. Type locality of species.	
?Contogenys	C. sp.		Ellisdale Site		A globaurid lizard.	
cf. Globidens	G. sp.		St. Georges		A globidensine mosasaur.	
Glyptosaurinae indet.			Ellisdale Site		An anguid lizard.	
cf. Halisaurus	H. sp.		Ellisdale Site		A halisaurine mosasaur.	
Haptosphenus	H. sp.		Ellisdale Site		A chamopsid lizard.	
cf. Odaxosaurus	O. sp.		Ellisdale Site		An anguid lizard.	
cf. Machaerosaurus	M. sp.		Ellisdale Site		An anguid lizard.	
Prototeius	P. stageri		Ellisdale Site		A chamopsid lizard. Type locality of genus and species.	

==== Choristodera ====
Choristoderes of the Marshalltown Formation
Genus	Species	Member	Location	Material	Notes	Images
Neochoristodera indet.			Ellisdale Site	1 vertebra	A neochoristodere, one of the very few records of this group from eastern North America.	

=== Mammals ===
Based on Grandstaff et al (1992):

Mammals of the Marshalltown Formation
Genus	Species	Member	Location	Material	Notes	Images
Cimolodontidae indet.			Ellisdale Site		A cimolodontid multituberculate.	
Cimolomys	C. cf. clarki		Ellisdale Site		A cimolomyid multiberculate.	
cf. Didelphodon	D. sp.		Ellisdale Site		A stagodontid metatherian.	
Protalphadon	P. lulli		Ellisdale Site		A metatherian.	

== See also ==
- List of dinosaur-bearing rock formations
  - List of stratigraphic units with few dinosaur genera
