= Poricy Park =

Nature preserve and park in Middletown Township, New Jersey

Coordinates: 40.369166°N 74.116119°W

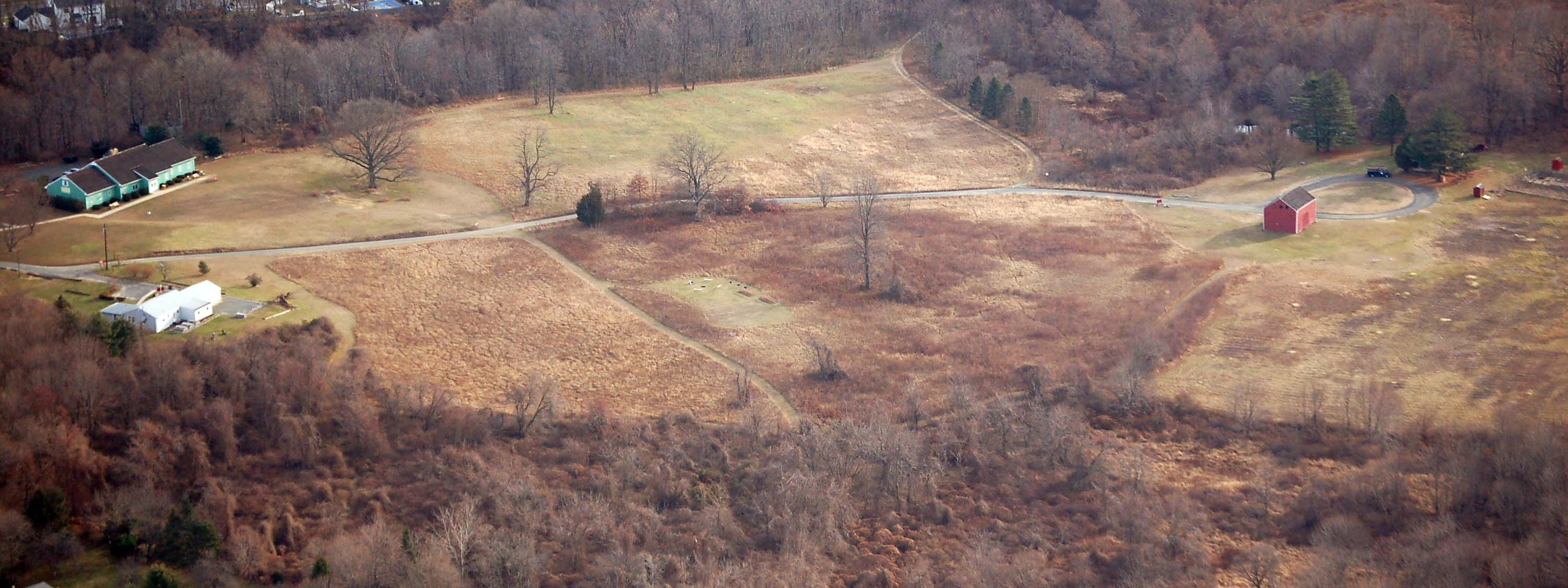
Poricy Park in Winter

Poricy Park is a 250 acres (100 ha) nature preserve and park in Middletown Township, Monmouth County, New Jersey. It is known for its Cretaceous period fossil shell beds along the Poricy Brook streambed, open to the public for limited collecting. The park also contains a Nature Center and the Murray Farmhouse and Barn, a New Jersey Historic Site.

== History ==
Poricy Park began in 1969 as local residents protested a proposed sewer project which would have impacted Poricy Brook. They formed a non-profit organization which in partnership with Middletown Township, the Nature Conservancy and New Jersey Green Acres began buying land between 1970 and 1973. The town designated the land as a nature preserve and leased the land to the Conservancy to manage. In 2004, the organization was officially renamed the Poricy Park Conservancy.

== Geology ==
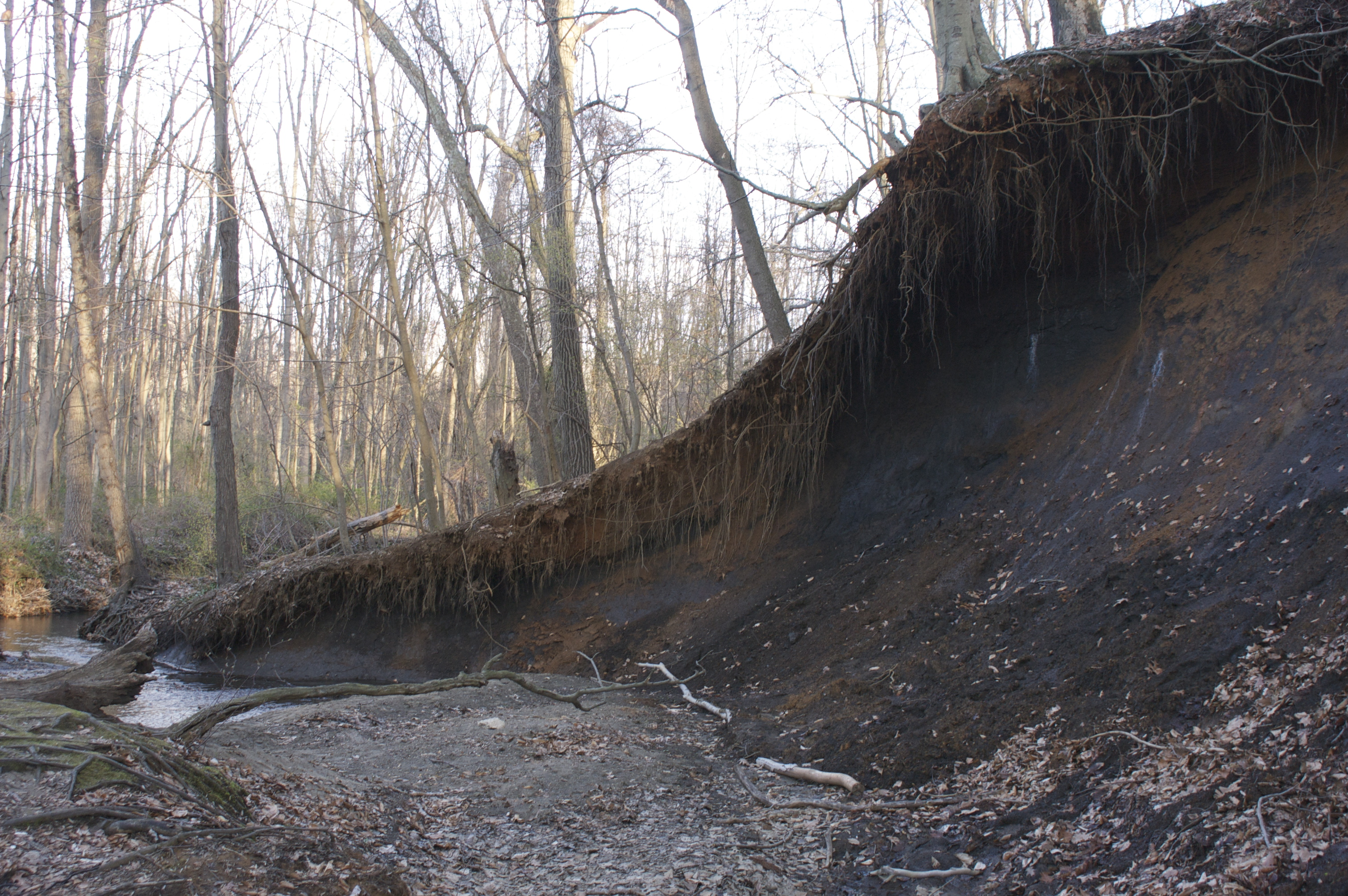
Poricy Brook

The Poricy Brook cuts through a number of geological layers which are rising due to glacial rebound. The highest layer is the rust colored sand of the Red Bank Formation. Several layers below that is the glauconitic marl of the Navesink Formation. Both of these geologic formations are from the Late Cretaceous period of the Mesozoic Era. The shell beds are 72 million years old and were probably an offshore marine shelf based on the fossil record. They range from 45 feet (14 m) to 65 feet (20 m) thick in the area.

== Fossils ==
The Nature Center has a display of fossils found in the area. They also rent screens and trowels for use while looking for fossils. The fossils in the exposed Navesink Formation are in the stream bed and are easily accessible from the parking lot along Middletown-Lincroft Road. There is a display sign with pictures of the fossils likely to be found. The Conservancy asks that visitors collect from the stream bed only and not to dig into the banks which only hastens erosion. They also ask that visitors collect conservatively and that anything unusual be given to the Nature Center.

Common fossils include Pyncnodonte mutabilis, Pyncnodonte convexa, Exogyra cancellata, Exogyra costata, Ostrea mesenterica, Agerostrea, Belemnitella americana and shark teeth. These are mostly extinct version of oysters and clams.

== Wildlife ==
Wildlife in Poricy park include rabbit, skunk, snake, bat, opossum, groundhog, white-tailed deer, American eel, multiple species of bird including owls, hawks, and Turkey Vultures as well as red fox (one seen 5/9/10 with pups). Murray pond supports frogs and turtles. Recently someone introduced Koi to that same small pond.
