= Vincentown Formation =

Geologic formation in New Jersey

- Stratigraphic range: Thanetian; ~58–55 Ma
- Type: Formation
- Underlies: Absecon Inlet Formation
- Overlies: Hornerstown Formation

Location
- Region: New Jersey
- Country: United States

The Vincentown Formation is a late Paleocene marine formation of New Jersey and Delaware composed chiefly of glauconitic and quartz sands with locally developed fossiliferous calcareous beds. It is a shallow-shelf deposit with a close correlation to the Aquia Formation of Maryland and Virginia, making it a key stratigraphic unit for regional Paleocene correlations along the Atlantic Coastal Plain.

Th formation contains marine invertebrate fauna dominated by bryozoans, mollusks, brachiopods, and foraminifera.

== See also ==
- List of fossiliferous stratigraphic units in New Jersey
- Paleontology in New Jersey
