= Manasquan Formation =

Geologic formation in New Jersey

- Stratigraphic range: Paleogene
- Type: Formation
- Underlies: Shark River Formation
- Overlies: Absecon Inlet Formation

Location
- Region: New Jersey
- Country: United States

The Manasquan Formation is a geologic formation in New Jersey. It preserves fossils dating back to the Paleogene period.

== See also ==
- List of fossiliferous stratigraphic units in New Jersey
- Paleontology in New Jersey
