= Pennsauken Creek =

River in New Jersey, United States

Coordinates: 39.990668°N 75.054339°W

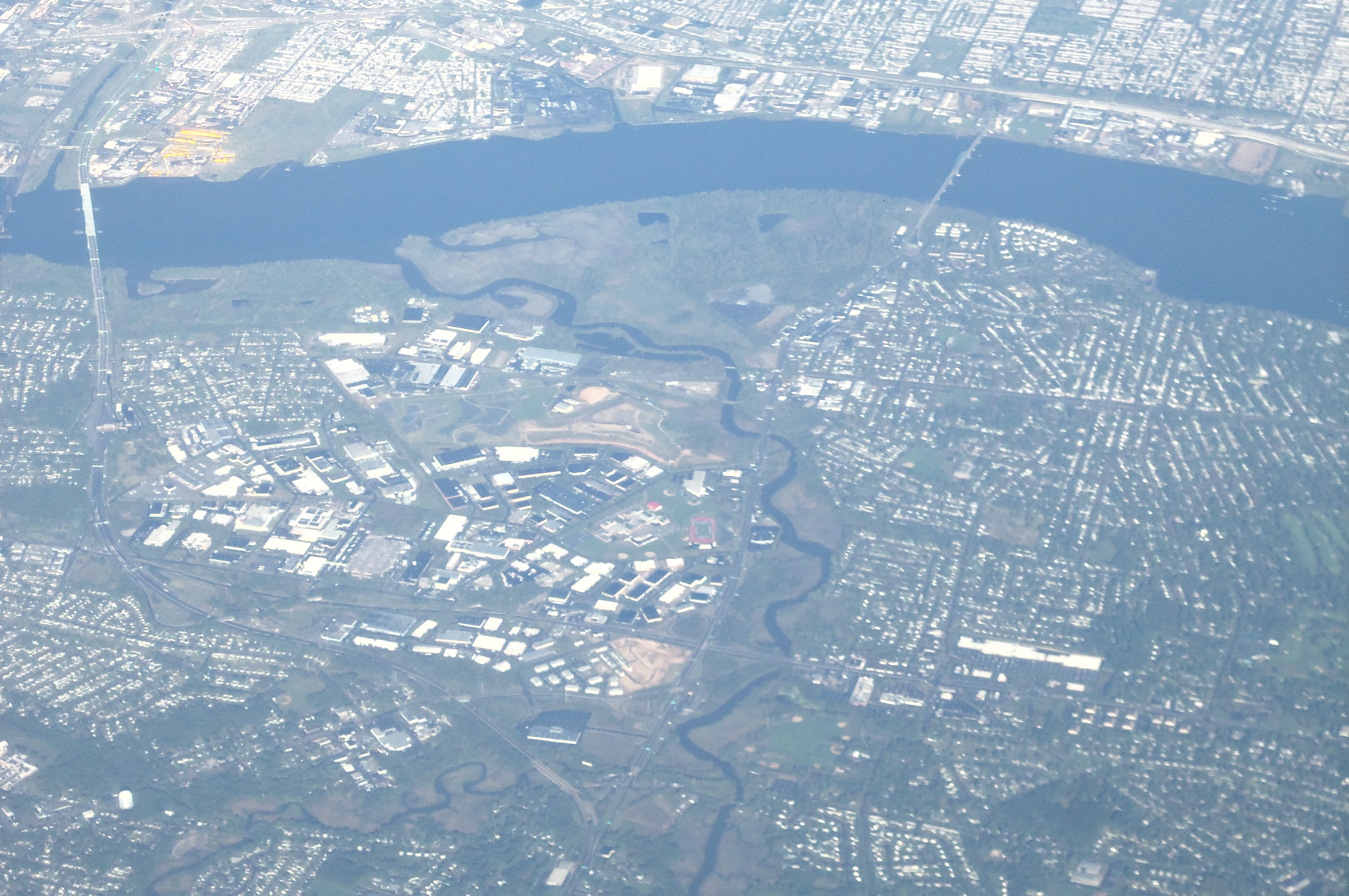
Pennsauken Creek flowing into the Delaware (2020)

Pennsauken Creek is a 3.8-mile-long (6.1 km) tributary of the Delaware River in Burlington and Camden counties, New Jersey in the United States.

Pennsauken Creek drains 33 square miles (85 km^{2}) of southwestern Burlington County and northern Camden County and joins the Delaware River near Palmyra.

The North Branch of the Pennsauken is in Burlington County, while the South Branch forms the boundary between Burlington and Camden counties. The tide affects the 3.8-mile (6.1 km) main stem and the first few miles up the branches. Both the North and South branches are approximately 10 miles long.

The Pennsauken Creek faces problems from agricultural and urban runoff, as well as wastewater treatment facilities. Landfills are also a source of contamination for the Pennsauken Creek, as well as industrial pollution near the mouth of the river's main stem.

== Etymology ==
The name of the creek, "Pennsauken," most likely came from "Pemisoakin," a Native American village in the area.

== Geology ==
The Pensauken Formation is named after exposures of unconsolidated sediment at the mouth of the creek.

== Tributaries ==
- North Branch Pennsauken Creek
- South Branch Pennsauken Creek

== See also ==
- List of rivers of New Jersey
