= Wenonah Formation =

- Stratigraphic range: Cretaceous
- Type: Formation
- Underlies: Mount Laurel Formation
- Overlies: Marshalltown Formation

Location
- Region: New Jersey
- Country: United States

The Wenonah Formation is a geologic formation in New Jersey. It preserves fossils dating back to the Cretaceous period.

== See also ==
- List of fossiliferous stratigraphic units in New Jersey
- Paleontology in New Jersey
