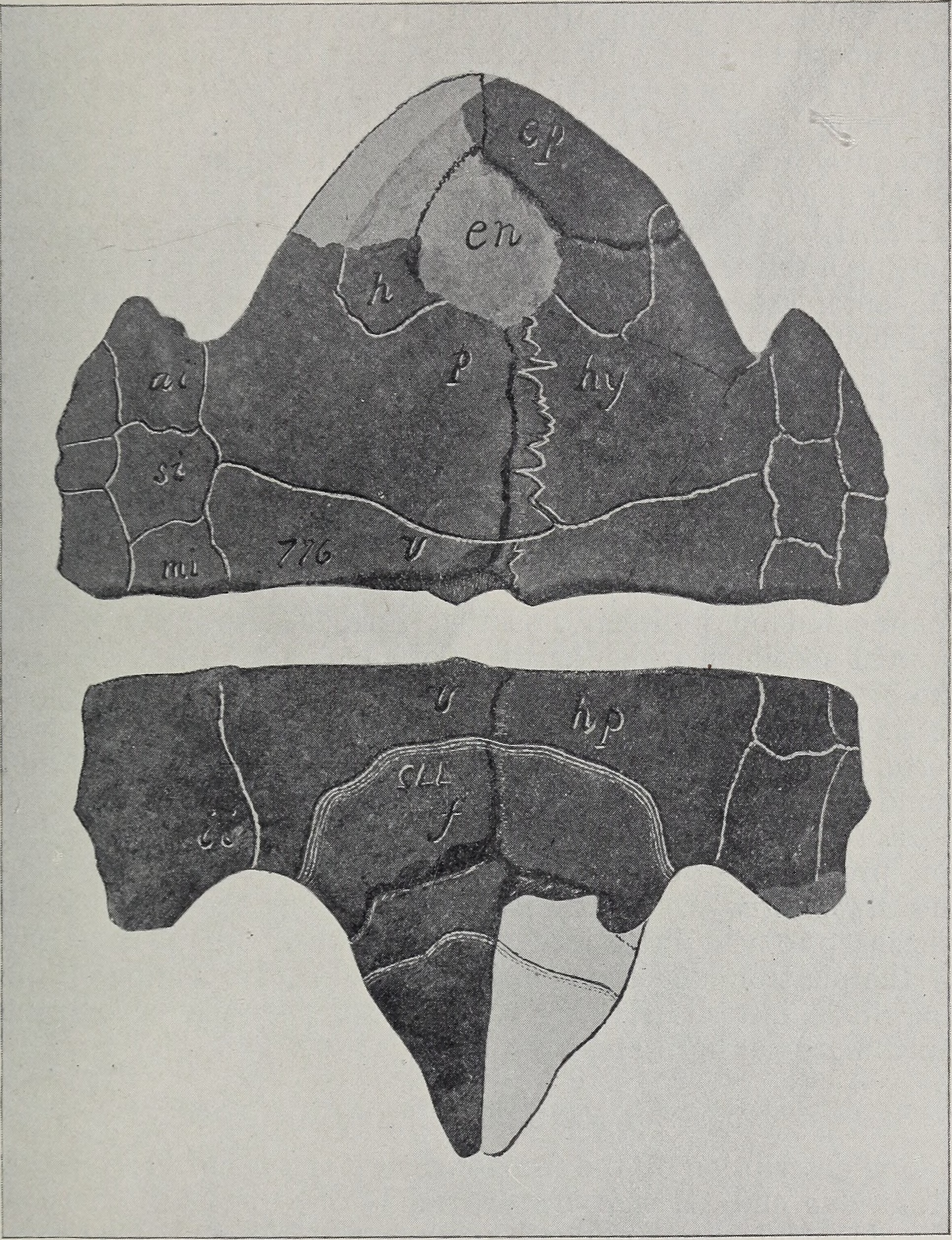

Scientific classification
- Kingdom: Animalia
- Phylum: Chordata
- Class: Reptilia
- Order: Testudines
- Suborder: Cryptodira
- Superfamily: Kinosternoidea
- Genus: †Agomphus; Cope 1871

Species
- Agomphus alabamensis; Agomphus oxysternum; Agomphus pectoralis

= Agomphus =

Agomphus Temporal range: Campanian-Eocene ~83.6–54 Ma

Extinct genus of turtle

Agomphus is a genus of extinct turtles in the family Kinosternoidea. It existed from the Late Cretaceous to Eocene. Fossils have been found in the Eastern United States (such as in Georgia, New Jersey, South Carolina and Alabama).

== Discovery ==
Agomphus was named by Edward Drinker Cope in the 1870s, the type specimen was found in New Jersey.

== Description ==
Agomphus is identified as a kinosternoid turtle by features such as costiform processes, a thickened, cross-shaped plastron, and the absence of extragular scutes. It is classified as a pan-dermatemydid due to the contact between the inguinal buttress and the eighth peripheral bone. Agomphus can be distinguished from other pan-dermatemydids by its short axillary buttresses, a highly domed shell (carapace), and broad neural bones.

== In popular culture ==
Agomphus is featured as an edible creature in the game Tasty Planet: Back for Seconds.
