= Tinton Formation =

Geological formation in New Jersey, USA

- Stratigraphic range: Maastrichtian-Paleocene, 66–65 Ma
- Type: Formation
- Underlies: Hornerstown Formation
- Overlies: Red Bank Sand

Location
- Region: New Jersey
- Country: United States

The Tinton Formation is a geologic formation in New Jersey. It preserves fossils dating back to the Cretaceous-Paleocene periods, such as ammonites.

== See also ==
- List of fossiliferous stratigraphic units in New Jersey
- Paleontology in New Jersey
