= Tasty Planet =

- Genre: Action
- Developer: Dingo Games
- Publishers: Dingo Games; PlayFirst
- Creators: James Sayer; Kris Sayer
- Artist: Kris Sayer
- Platforms: Windows; Macintosh; iOS; Android
- First release: Tasty Planet (2006); November 4, 2006
- Latest release: Tasty Planet: Final Bite; January 23, 2026

Tasty Planet is a top-down and side-scrolling video game series developed by Comox-based studio Dingo Games and published by Delaware-based PlayFirst and Dingo Games for Windows, Macintosh, iOS, and Android.

The series began with the release of Tasty Planet in 2006. The latest installment, Tasty Planet: Final Bite, was published in 2026.

The games are focused on the growth of various characters, notably the prototype bathroom cleaner or nanotechnology experiment, the "Grey Goo", which is based on the hypothetical doomsday scenario of the same name. Each game is divided into levels, following a controllable character that can eat anything smaller than itself, constantly growing in size every time it eats.

The Tasty Planet series was praised for its entertaining and addictive gameplay, but received criticism for lack of originality.

== General gameplay ==
The game series stars a cast of protagonists that gradually grow as they eat smaller objects and living beings around them. The main goal is to grow to a certain size. There are tilt controls, touch controls and mouse controls.

Sometimes, touching hazards can damage the character, reducing its size or even killing it, depending on the specific level and difficulty setting.

Tasty Planet franchise release timeline
2006	Tasty Planet
2007
2008
2009
2010	Tasty Planet: Back for Seconds
2011
2012
2013
2014	Tasty Blue
2015
2016
2017
2018	Tasty Planet Forever
2019
2020
2021
2022
2023
2024
2025
2026	Tasty Planet: Final Bite

== Tasty Planet (2006) ==
=== Gameplay ===
Tasty Planet features a 2D top-down perspective. The player controls a Grey Goo with their mouse, guiding it towards smaller elements in order to eat them. A target size is displayed in the top-left corner, and must be reached before the timer expires. Contact with larger objects may cause the character to explode, forcing a level restart.

The game has 60 levels. A new level promoting one of Dingo Games' other titles, Laser Dolphin, was released for iOS on May 4, 2011.

=== Plot ===
The plot is shown solely through comic strips at the beginning and end of some levels. The first comic strip shows a scientist telling his assistant about his latest discovery, the Grey Goo, a microscopic bathroom cleaner that can eat anything smaller than itself and grows every time it eats.

After eating the Moon, Earth, and the Solar System, the Goo moves on to nearby stars like Alpha Centauri and beyond the Milky Way. However, its mass becomes too great after devouring the fabric of space and time, and it implodes, destroying and recreating the universe.

=== Reception ===
Tasty Planet was compared by reviewers to Katamari Damacy, for its similar gameplay.

Joel Brodie, writing for Gamezebo, praised the game for its addictive gameplay. At the same time, he pointed out the crude graphics, music reused from other games and an unoriginal premise. A Macworld review by Peter Cohen described the Mac version as having a "fun, cartoon-drawn style and a peppy, upbeat lounge-like soundtrack". He also highlighted the diversified gameplay. However, Cohen criticized the uneven difficulty between levels, with some being frustratingly challenging.

== Tasty Planet: Back for Seconds (2010) ==
=== Gameplay ===
Tasty Planet: Back for Seconds consists of 48 levels, divided into six chapters: "Modern Era", "Cretaceous Era", "Ancient Egypt", "Ancient Rome", "Feudal Japan", and "Far Future".

The game introduced a new feature compared to its predecessor: during a level, once the grey goo reaches a certain size, the environment expands and new objects are available. There is also a cooperative mode, where both players control their own goo. It allows them to experience the entire game together, as well as special levels that require cooperation.

=== Plot ===
The story presents a scientist who created a grey goo. The creature eats candy left on a table by the scientist's assistant and grows as other objects become accessible. Eventually, it absorbs the scientist's time machine and proceeds to travel throughout history, feeding on all kinds of objects. Its trips include the Cretaceous period, Ancient Egypt, Ancient Rome, and feudal Japan. In the process, it prevents the dinosaurs' extinction and the fall of Rome, and destroys the Great Pyramids.

The scientist by this point has figured out that the Grey Goo has only one jump left, this time to their future, and they must be prepared for it, so he and his assistant preserve their brains so they can survive until the goo appears. They prepare microscopic robots and energy weapons to stop the Goo, but it survives and infinitely consumes the turtles that the universe rests on.

=== Reception ===
Gamezebo's Jon Mundy was positive about the enemy AI, pointing out how gratifying it felt to eat an enemy that had previously chased the character. He also praised the special levels and humorous comic strips, and noticed improvement in the graphics and soundtrack. Mundy did, however, state that the gameplay "can become a little stale".

== Tasty Blue (2014) ==
Tasty Blue is the third game in the franchise. It is the first game in the franchise to not be top-down, instead being a side-scroller, and the first not to feature the Grey Goo as the protagonist. It is set in the ocean, where the player navigates one of three aquatic creatures: a goldfish, a dolphin or a shark. It was released for macOS on May 21, 2014.

=== Gameplay ===
Tasty Blue has over 70 levels that take place across three different areas: temperate, tropical, and arctic. It also features a split-screen multiplayer mode.

=== Reception ===
Pocket Gamer's Harry Slater described the game as "fun, pure and simple", while acknowledging the limited depth and originality of the gameplay.

== Tasty Planet Forever (2018) ==
Tasty Planet Forever is the fourth game in the franchise and was released on October 16, 2018. It has eight main worlds, each with its own distinct protagonist and scenario, alongside eight bonus characters. The game features over 150 levels and includes a co-op mode.

== Tasty Planet: Final Bite (2026) ==
Tasty Planet: Final Bite is the fifth game in the franchise, and was released on January 23, 2026. It has six scenarios, each featuring a different storyline and protagonist.
