= Magothy Formation =

Geologic formation in the Mid-Atlantic region of the United States

- Stratigraphic range: Turonian
- Type: Formation
- Underlies: Cheesequake Formation
- Overlies: Raritan Formation

Location
- Region: Delaware, Maryland, New Jersey, and New York
- Country: United States

The Magothy Formation is an Upper Cretaceous geologic formation in northeastern Maryland and extending into Delaware, New Jersey, and New York.

== Description ==
The Magothy Formation extends from Long Island, New York, south to Maryland. It preserves fossils dating back to the Turonian stage of the Cretaceous period.

In New York, the Magothy Formation is best known for its aquifer. The Magothy Aquifer is the main source of drinking water for the majority of Long Island, and the water drawn from it serves millions of people on the island each day.

== See also ==
- List of fossiliferous stratigraphic units in Maryland
- Geography of Long Island
- Geology of New York (state)
- Geology of New Jersey
- Paleontology in Maryland
