= Telmatornis =

Telmatornis Temporal range: Late Cretaceous (Maastrichtian)

Scientific classification
- Kingdom: Animalia
- Phylum: Chordata
- Class: Aves
- Order: Charadriiformes
- Genus: †Telmatornis; Marsh, 1870
- Species: †T. priscus

Binomial name
- †Telmatornis priscus Marsh, 1870

Synonyms
- Telmatornis affinis Marsh, 1870 ?"Graculavus" pumilis Marsh, 1872

Extinct genus of birds

Telmatornis is a valid prehistoric bird genus which has been placed in Charadriiformes. It apparently lived in the Late Cretaceous; its remains were found in the early Maastrichtian (c.71-68 million years ago) Navesink Formation of New Jersey. A single species is included today, Telmatornis priscus.

There is some uncertainty about its taxonomic affiliation. For some time it was united with other taxa of aquatic birds from around the Cretaceous-Paleocene boundary in the form taxon "Graculavidae", the supposed "transitional shorebirds", but this group is now known to be artificial. Some sources erroneously claim it was allied with ducks and geese. The reason for this is that the early anseriform Anatalavis rex was for some time included in Telmatornis. Hope (2002), however, noted that Telmatornis shares many characters with members of Charadriiformes, the ancient and diverse group of modern birds that includes for example gulls, auks and waders.

A cladistic analysis of the forelimb skeleton (Varricchio 2002) found it highly similar to the great crested grebe and unlike the painted buttonquail (now known to be a basal charadriiform lineage), the black-necked stilt (a more advanced charadriiform), or the limpkin (a member of the Grui suborder of Gruiformes), namely in that its dorsal condyle of the humerus was not angled at 20°–30° away from long axis of the humerus. The analysis did not result in a phylogenetic pattern but rather grouped some birds with similar wing shapes together while others stood separate. It is thus unknown whether this apparent similarity to grebes represents an evolutionary relationship, or whether Telmatornis simply had a wing convergent on that of grebes and moved it like they do.
