= Matawan Formation =

Geologic formation in the United States

- Stratigraphic range: Cretaceous
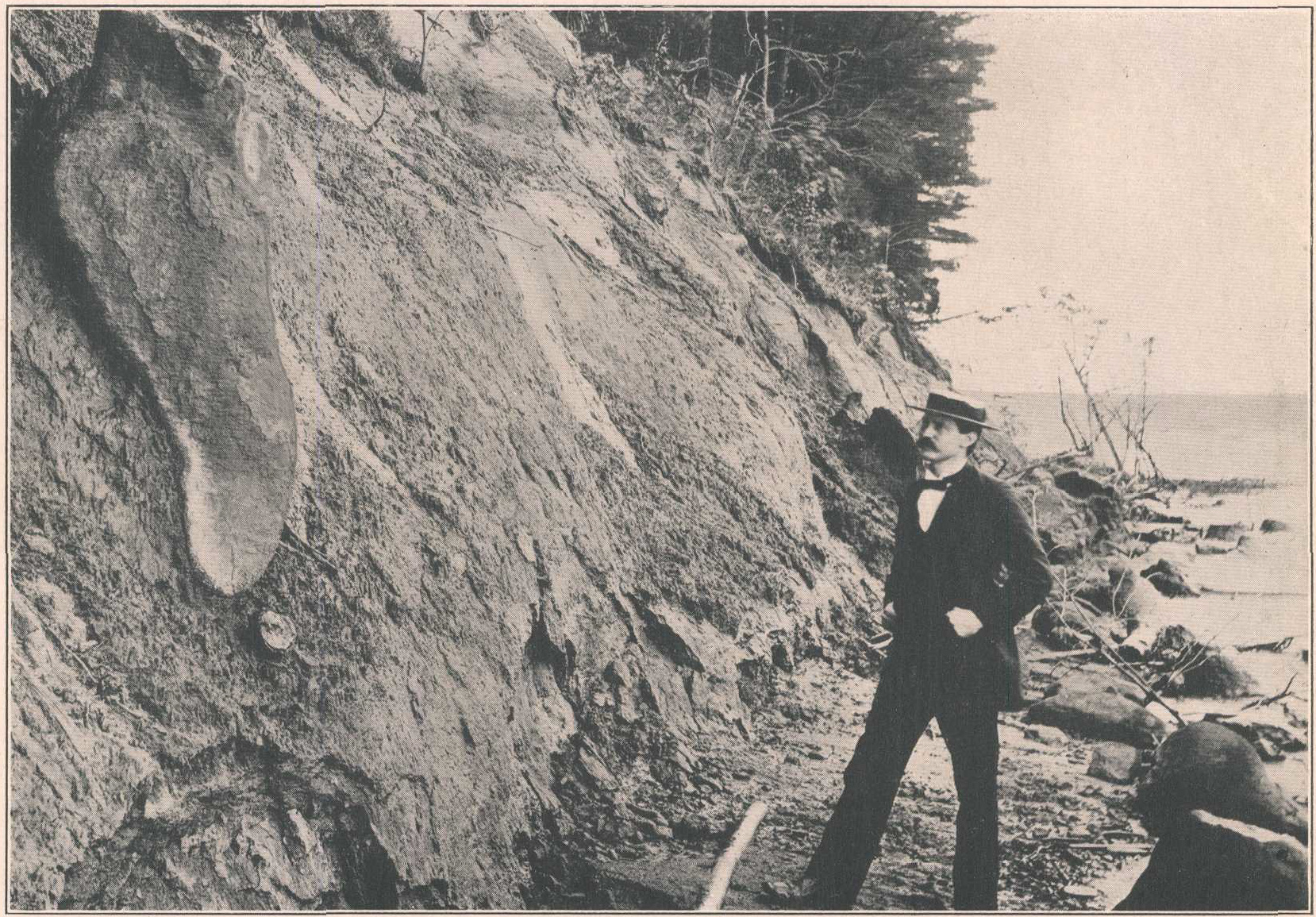
- Matawan Formation containing large concretions, Gibson Island (c. 1917)
- Type: Sedimentary

Location
- Region: Maryland, New Jersey
- Country: United States

Type section
- Named for: Matawan Creek
- Named by: William Bullock Clark

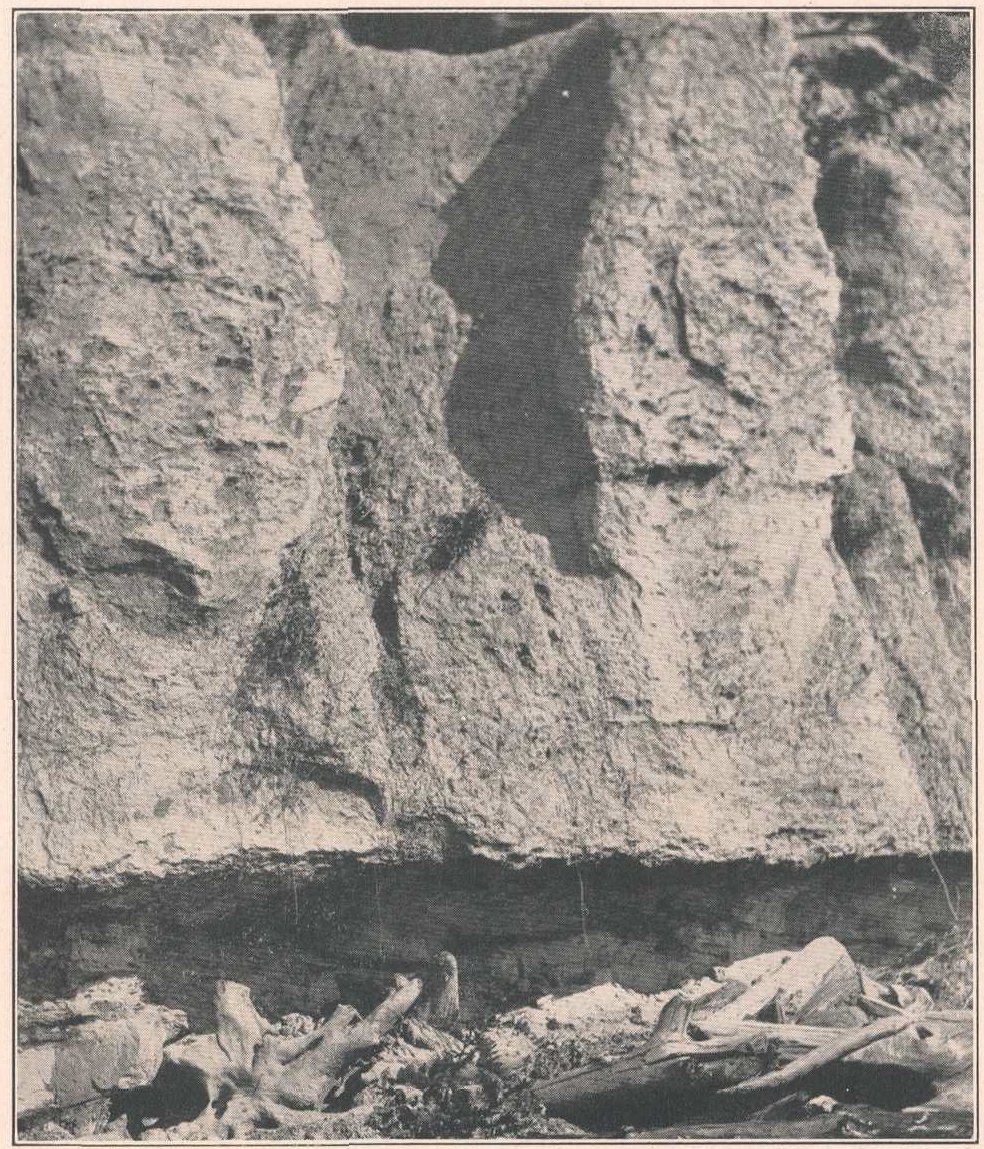
Bluff of clay marl of Matawan Formation underlain by Magothy Formation near Grove Point, Cecil County, Maryland.

The Matawan Formation is a geologic formation in Maryland and New Jersey. It preserves fossils dating back to the Cretaceous period.

A description of the formation in Maryland from the USGS Tolochester Folio (1917) follows:

The formation consists chiefly of glauconitic sand intimately mixed with dark-colored clay, but all through the material small flakes of mica are abundant. In some places the deposits consist almost entirely of black clay; in others, particularly where the upper beds are exposed, the arenaceous phase is predominant, and some beds consist entirely of sand ranging in color from white to dark greenish-black. Where the glauconite decomposes, the iron oxidizes and the materials are stained reddish-brown and in places are firmly indurated by the iron oxide. In places a small layer of gravel lies at the base of the formation. Small amounts of pyrite are occasionally seen. A prominent feature in several exposures of the Matawan formation in this quadrangle is the presence of large spherical to oblong concretions of clay ironstone, in places very numerous and attaining a length of 5 feet and a thickness of 3 feet. They stand erect in the formation in most places. In the erosion of the bluffs of the formation, they persist long after the inclosing loose sands and sandy clays have been removed and are found scattered over the beaches in large numbers. They are especially noticeable on Dutch Ship Island, on the west side of Gibson Island, and in the high bluff at the mouth of Lloyd Creek.

== See also ==
- List of fossiliferous stratigraphic units in Maryland
- Paleontology in Maryland
