= Mount Laurel Formation =

Mesozoic geologic formation in New Jersey and Delaware

- Stratigraphic range: late Campanian to early Maastrichtian
- Type: Geological formation
- Underlies: Navesink Formation
- Overlies: Wenonah Formation

Location
- Region: New Jersey, Delaware
- Country: United States

The Mount Laurel Formation is a Mesozoic geologic formation located in New Jersey and Delaware. Dinosaur remains diagnostic to the genus level are among the fossils that have been recovered from the formation. Dinosaur teeth recovered from this formation include tyrannosauroid teeth similar to those of Dryptosaurus, as well as teeth from a ~3-4m saurornitholestine dromaeosaurid. Other fossils include: Belemnites in the genus Belemnitella, Oysters such as Exogyra and Pycnodonte, and rare mosasaur, turtle, and plesiosaur remains.

== See also ==
- List of dinosaur-bearing rock formations
  - List of stratigraphic units with few dinosaur genera
