= Navesink Formation =

Geological Formation in New Jersey

- Stratigraphic range: Maastrichtian
- Type: Geological formation
- Unit of: Monmouth Group
- Underlies: Sandy Hook Formation, New Egypt Formation
- Overlies: Mount Laurel Formation

Location
- Coordinates: 39.8°N 75.2°W
- Approximate paleocoordinates: 40.2°N 50.3°W
- Region: New Jersey
- Country: United States

Type section
- Named for: Navesink, New Jersey

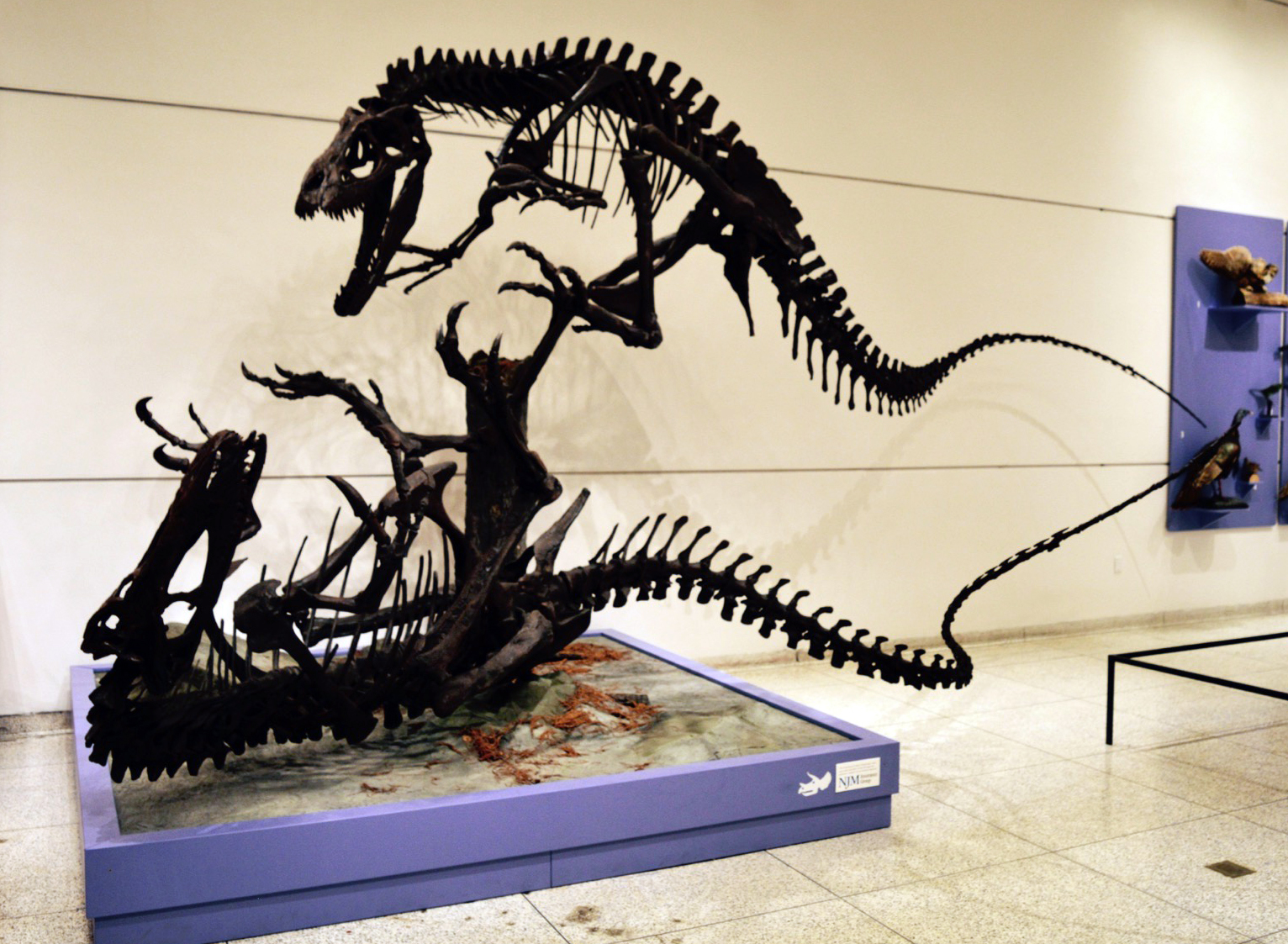

The Navesink Formation is a 66 to 70 mya greensand glauconitic marl and sand geological formation in New Jersey. It is known for its Cretaceous period fossil shell beds and dinosaur bones.

== Description ==
The Navesink Formation, named after Navesink, New Jersey, is typically found above the Mount Laurel Formation and under the Red Bank Formation. There is a 5 mya gap between the Navesink and Mount Laurel Formations. The Navesink varies in depth from 45 feet (14 m) to 65 feet (20 m) across its range from Sandy Hook to Pennsville.

The Navesink has the highest radon gas potential of the New Jersey geologic formations.

== Sites ==
There are several locations where the Navesink Formation is visible including Poricy Park in Middletown, New Jersey which has several exposures along Poricy Brook. There is also exposure in Big Brook Park in Marlboro, NJ.

== Paleofauna ==
Dinosaurs: Color key: Taxon / Reclassified taxon / Taxon falsely reported as present / Dubious taxon or junior synonym / Ichnotaxon / Ootaxon / Morphotaxon / Notes; Uncertain or tentative taxa are in small text; ~~crossed out~~ taxa are discredited.
Genus	Species	Material	Notes	Images
Coelosaurus	C. antiquus	Tibia	An ornithomimid.	
Diplotomodon	D. horrificus	Tooth	Indeterminate theropod.	
Dryptosaurus	D. aquilunguis		A large eutyrannosaur.	
Hadrosaurus	H. foukii	Caudal vertebrae	A hadrosaurid.	
"Hadrosaurus"	"H." minor	Partial hindlimb, vertebrae, [and] ribs.	Probably a basal hadrosaurid different from Hadrosaurus.	
Nodosauridae	Indeterminate	Vertebra	An indeterminate nodosaurid, possibly a new taxon.	
Ornithomimosauria	Indeterminate	End of metatarsal, end of tibia, pedal phalanges	Ornithomimosaur part of "Laelaps" macropus.	
"Teihivenator"	Indeterminate	Tibia fragments	Informal genus of tyrannosauroid theropod. Might be a chimera of tyrannosauroid and ornithomimid remains.	
Telmatornis	T. priscus		Possibly a charadriform.	
Tyrannosauroidea	Indeterminate	Tibia	Tyrannosauroid part of "Laelaps" macropus. A small tyrannosauroid, possibly juvenile, closely related to Bistahieversor.	
Tyrannosauroidea	Indeterminate	Pedal phalanx	A large tyrannosauroid possibly the same taxon as "Laelaps" macropus.	
