= Paleontology in New Jersey =

Paleontological research in the U.S. state of New Jersey

The location of New Jersey in the United States

Paleontology in New Jersey refers to paleontological research in the U.S. state of New Jersey. The state is especially rich in marine deposits.

During the Precambrian, New Jersey was covered by a shallow sea that was home to stromatolite forming bacteria. During the early part of the Paleozoic, the state was still covered by the sea, which was home to creatures like brachiopods and trilobites. By the Silurian, the northern part of the state was home to a river system. Sea levels rose and fell throughout the remainder of the state's Paleozoic rock record. There are no local rocks of Carboniferous or Permian age. During the Triassic, the state was a terrestrial ecoregion. Local lakes were home to the crustacean Cyzicus and the coelacanth Diplurus. On land, dinosaurs left behind footprints, and continued to do so into the Jurassic.

A sea rose over southern New Jersey during the Cretaceous. Invertebrates, plesiosaurs and turtles lived in its waters. Dinosaurs roamed the land. New Jersey has the most fossiliferous Late Cretaceous rocks of the Mid-Atlantic region. Southern New Jersey remained a sea home to invertebrates and sharks into the Cenozoic era. By the Ice Age, northern New Jersey was home to mastodons and glaciers covered the northern part of the state. Local Native Americans are known to have possessed petrified wood. By the late 18th century, local fossils had attracted scientific attention. In the mid-19th century Hadrosaurus foulkii was discovered and named. The Cretaceous duck-billed dinosaur Hadrosaurus foulkii is the New Jersey state fossil.

== Prehistory ==
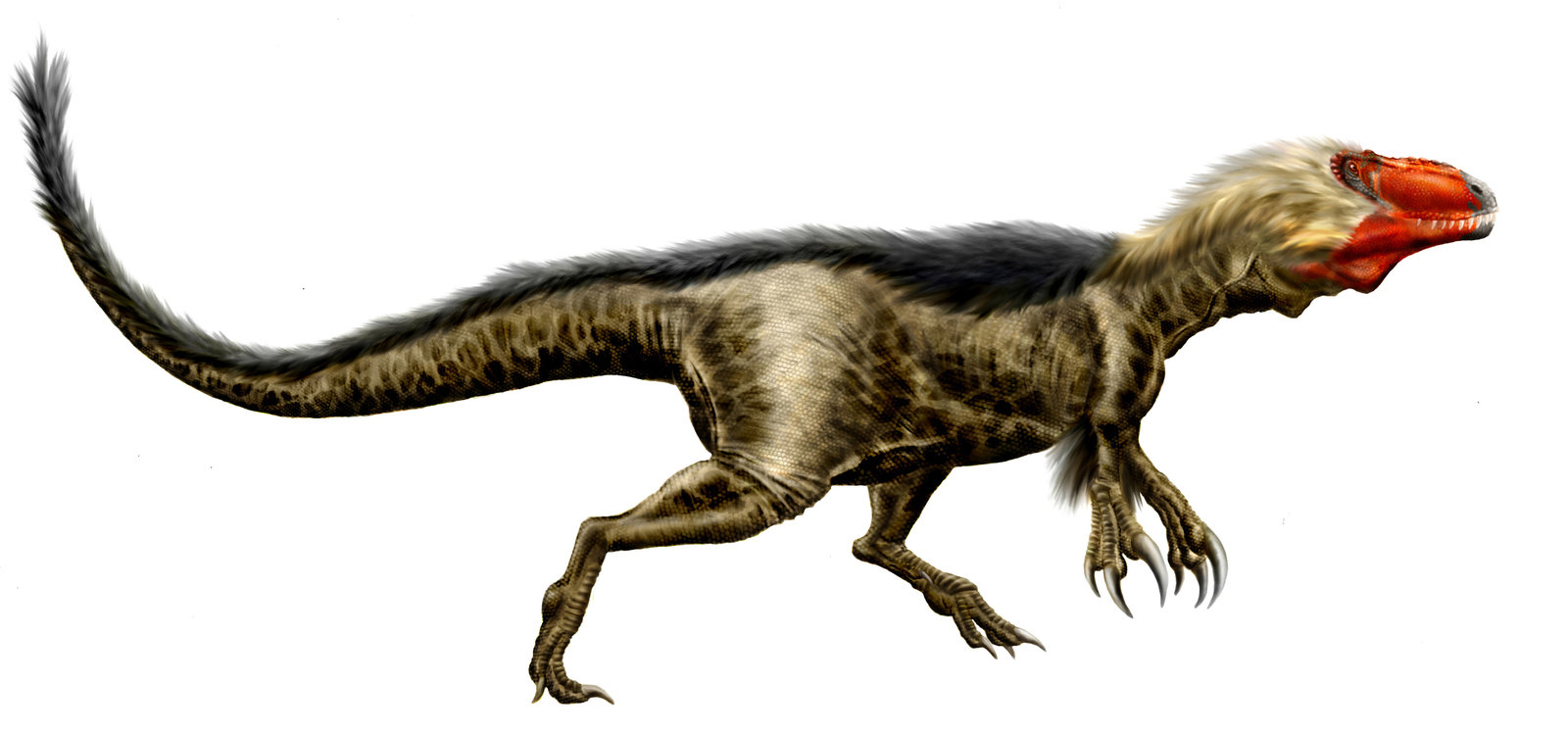
Dryptosaurus

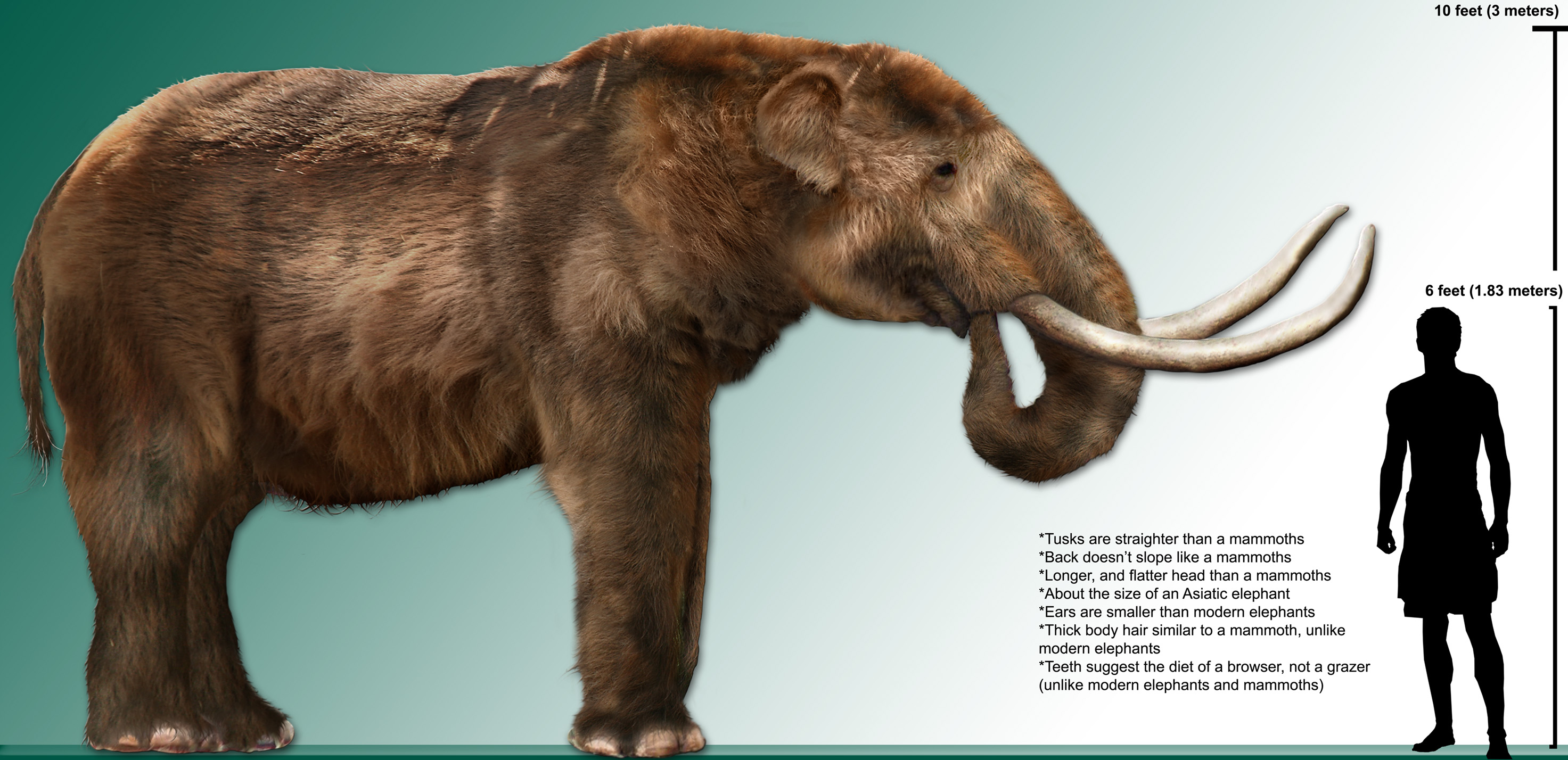
American mastodon

During the Precambrian New Jersey was covered in seawater. The activities of contemporary local bacteria formed stromatolites in those waters. During the Cambrian period of Paleozoic era New Jersey was still inundated by seawater. Cambrian life left behind few fossils in New Jersey. Among the Cambrian fossils that are present were brachiopods and trilobites. Stromatolites continued to form in the local area. During the ensuing Ordovician period the seas deepened. Like the Cambrian, Ordovician life also left little evidence for paleontologists to interpret in New Jersey. Ordovician fossils include corals, sponges, and trilobites. Northern New Jersey was home to a river system during the Silurian. As time went on local sea levels rose and fell so the area alternated between a riverside or marine environment. In contrast to the Ordovician, Silurian fossils were preserved in abundance near Clinton. During the Late Silurian the area remained submerged by the shallow sea through the Devonian. The local sea was inhabited by creatures like brachiopods, bryozoans, corals, and crinoids. Local sediments were being eroded away rather than deposited from the Carboniferous to the Permian, so there are no rocks of this age in which fossils could have been preserved.

During the Triassic, New Jersey was experiencing geologic upheaval caused by the breakup of Pangaea. Rifts formed in the state as the supercontinent was being disassembled. Water filled these rifts and created large lakes. Local reptiles would sometimes be preserved in the sediments of these lakes. During the Triassic, local dinosaurs left behind footprints that would later fossilize. Other Triassic life included the coelacanth Diplurus, which fossilized by the hundreds, and the crustacean Cyzicus, which also left behind abundant fossils. Cycads were significant members of the state's fossil flora. In the Jurassic, Pangaea was still breaking up. Lava flows formed in New Jersey during the Jurassic. Local dinosaurs left behind footprints that would later fossilize.

During the ensuing Cretaceous period the southern part of New Jersey was submerged under seawater. Invertebrate remains are the state's most common Cretaceous fossils. Invertebrates that lived in New Jersey during the Cretaceous include the oysters Exogyra ponderosa and Gryphaea. Others include mollusks and the tubular trace fossil Halymenites major. Cephalopods were also present. More than fifty different vertebrate species from this time have been found in New Jersey. Shark teeth are relatively common, but bony fish remains are rare. Among the local fishes were sharks and rays. These were generally more abundant in Cretaceous New Jersey than they were at the same time in the Seaway of the western US. The swordfish-like bony fish Protosphyraena has been preserved in the Navesink Formation. The turtle Bothremys also lived in New Jersey during the Cretaceous. Other local marine vertebrates included plesiosaurs and mosasaurs. Occasionally fossil footprints dating back to this age are found. Few plant fossils are known in New Jersey from this time. Northern New Jersey, in contrast to the state's southern half, was dry land. A rich flora grew in the state at the time. Local plants left behind leaves that would later fossilize. Local insect life also left behind fossils. Dinosaurs inhabited the region in forests and swamps, such as ornithopods like Hadrosaurus, and theropods like Dryptosaurus, "Coelosaurus" antiquus, and Dromaeosaurs, as well as birds. In addition, there were many other reptiles found, most notably crocodilians like Deinosuchus and Thoracosaurus. They left behind both footprints and bones.

During the Tertiary period of the ensuing Cenozoic era the local New Jersey climate was warmer than it is today. Southern New Jersey remained inundated by seawater. Brachiopods, corals, echinoderms, and sharks lived there. On land, there were at least 8 kinds of Eocene bird in New Jersey. Miocene life in New Jersey included a brachiopod, a crustacean, more than 60 pelecypods and more than forty gastropods. During the Quaternary northern New Jersey was covered by glaciers. Local sea levels rose and fell in time with the melting or expansion of the glaciers. Pleistocene deer, fish, and whale fossils have been found under the marshes of Atlantic and Cape May Counties. Mastodons living in New Jersey left behind remains in places like Mannington Township and the region between Hackettstown and Vienna. Even areas off the Atlantic coast bear mastodon remains. Mammoths also inhabited the state.

== History ==
=== Indigenous interpretations ===
Two ancient Native American archaeological sites dating from between the years 1000 and 1500 preserved pieces of Miocene petrified wood. The fossils had evidently been transported a significant distance from their place of origin to their final resting place in the Native villages. Each piece of petrified was charred. This suggests that the Native villagers had attempted to burn them. Archaeologists who studied the sites have suggested that shamans may have burned the petrified wood to highlight its non-flammability, which may have seemed supernatural. Another possibility is that the fossils were burnt for a magic ritual aimed at having one's wishes granted.

=== Scientific research ===
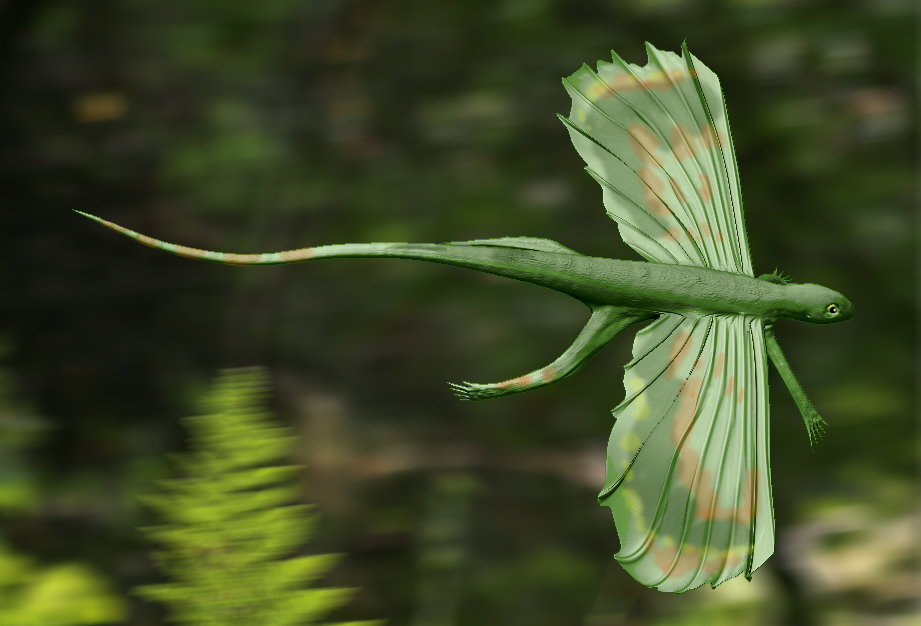
Icarosaurus

One of the earliest significant events relating to paleontology in New Jersey occurred on October 5, 1787. Caspar Wistar and Timothy Matlack presented a probable dinosaur metatarsal discovered in Late Cretaceous rocks near Woodbury Creek as "a large thigh bone" to the American Philosophical Society in Philadelphia, Pennsylvania. In 1818, more Cretaceous reptile remains were reported from the state. A tooth and partial jaw recovered from the Navesink Formation of New Jersey were described for the scientific literature. These were the first mosasaur fossils scientifically documented in North America. Another early New Jersey discovery helped clarify a misinterpretation of a fossil found out west. 1830 Isaac Hays described a new species of fossil fish from the Cretaceous of New Jersey that he named Saurodon leanus. The new find by Hays was similar enough to the purported marine reptile Saurocephalus lanciformis discovered in Iowa during the Lewis and Clark Expedition that he realized Saurocephalus had been misidentified and was actually a fish.

Another significant event occurred around 1838, when workers excavating marl for fertilizer on land owned by John E. Hopkins uncovered some Late Cretaceous bones. The remains were mostly vertebrae but also included a possible shoulder blade. Hopkins wasn't especially interested in the bones and allowed some guests to take away all of the bones. He never could remember the names of those who took the bones, so they were lost to science. Later rumors speculated that the fossils ended up as door stops and window props.

Later in the 19th century, during the summer of 1858, William Foulke heard about the fossil bones that had been discovered on the Hopkins farm while spending the summer in Haddonfield. In the fall of that same year, Foulke hired a team to reopen the Hopkins marl pit, which had become overgrown. Roughly 10 feet down they found bones. Then Joseph Leidy described the fossils found by Foulke in the reopened Hopkins marl pit. He noted the discovery of 28 partial vertebrae, a complete humerus, ulna, and radius, a partial ilium and possible pubis, a complete femur and tibia, a fibula with one end missing, two complete metatarsals and a phalanx, two small pieces of the jaws and nine teeth.[68] He interpreted the fossils as the remains of a bipedal amphibious reptile that had been swept out to sea by the river it lived alongside. Leidy called the creature Hadrosaurus foulkii after Foulke.

In 1865, Joseph Leidy described a single poorly preserved tooth of a Late Cretaceous theropod from the greensand at Mullica Hill. He called the animal who left the tooth Diplotomodon horrificus. In 1866, dinosaur remains were discovered in a marl pit near Barnsboro, New Jersey, owned by the Wet Jersey Marl Company. The discovery included partial lower jaws with teeth, both humeri, the left femur, tibia, and fibula, and a large number of vertebrae. He called it Laelaps aquilunguis. Two years later, in 1868, several significant paleontological events occurred. The first was Leidy's work with artist Benjamin Waterhouse Hawkins to mount Hadrosaurus foulkii for the Academy of Natural Sciences of Philadelphia. This became both the first mounted dinosaur skeleton ever mounted for public display but also one of the most popular exhibits in the history of the Academy. Estimates have the Hadrosaurus exhibit as increasing the number of visitors by up to 50%. Also that year, Cope gave Othniel Charles Marsh a tour of the marl pit where Laelaps was found. While there, Marsh secretly made arrangements with some of the workers for them to send any fossils they found to him at the Yale Peabody Museum instead of to Cope at the Academy of Natural Sciences of Philadelphia. This may have been the "first shot" of the Bone Wars.

1869 was another busy year for New Jersey paleontology. In 1869, a nearly complete mastodon skeleton was discovered in Mannington Township preserved in a grey bed of marl. In life it would have been 9 feet 8 inches tall and 22 feet long. The specimen was curated by the Rutgers museum. A major dinosaur discovery also occurred. Samuel Lockwood discovered Late Cretaceous dinosaur fossils along the shore of Raritan Bay at Union. The find was scant and only preserved the lower part of the leg and the ankle bones of the animal. That May, Lockwood wrote a letter to Marsh describing an encounter with Cope. Just before Lockwood was going to ship the fossils he found at Union to Marsh, Cope appeared and asked for the remains. Lockwood refused, but allowed the insistent Cope to see the fossils. Cope made drawings and notes about the remains. Cope formally described the fossils as Ornithotarsus imannis before Marsh could receive the fossils.

One of the significant late 19th century events was Marsh's 1870 naming of a new species of Hadrosaurus, H. minor, based on vertebrae sent to him by his surreptitious contacts established at the West Jersey Marl Company's Barnsboro quarry. In 1886, John Eyerman discovered fossil footprints near Milford in Hunterdon County. Rounding out the 19th century was Lewis Woolman's 1896 discovery of a 15 inch long fossil foot bone in Merchantville during excavations for a Pennsylvania Railroad underpass. Woolman sent the specimen to Cope, who referred it to Ornithotarsus.

Early in the 20th century, the end of a broken theropod foot bone was discovered in a Roebling sand pit on the Delaware River's south bank. This specimen was likely a Late Cretaceous fossil from the Raritan Formation and was donated to Princeton University by Charles C. Abbot. Another early 20th century discovery occurred around 1914. Dinosaur footprints were discovered in the Hampton Cutter Clay Works Pit at Woodbridge in Middlesex County but were accidentally destroyed while being excavated. In 1929, dinosaur footprints were discovered in the Hampton Cutter Clay Works Pit at Woodbridge in Middlesex County. These 90-million-year-old tracks are among the few known Cretaceous dinosaur footprints in the eastern United States.

The mid-20th century saw several important fossil discoveries. In 1946 a major fossils fish find occurred in Princeton, when hundreds of fossil coelacanths of the Triassic genus Diplurus were discovered under Princeton University's Firestone Library. Many specimens of the crustacean Cyzicus were also discovered. Later, in 1966, Edwin Colbert described the small gliding lizard Icarosaurus siefkeri, which was discovered at North Bergen.

More recently, on September 29, 1984, a small monument paid for by the Academy of Natural Sciences of Philadelphia was dedicated to Hadrosaurus foulkii near the site of its discovery in Haddonfield. The dedication was the culmination of Haddonfield resident Christopher Brees's Eagle Scout project. Almost a decade later, on June 13, 1991, Governor James Florio signed a bill declaring Hadrosaurus foulkii to be the state dinosaur of New Jersey.

In November 2014 a large cache of late Cretaceous fossils was discovered in a quarry in Mantua Township, and suspected to be a relic of the event that caused the Extinction of the dinosaurs.

== People ==
=== Births ===
- Robert T. Bakker was born in Bergen County on March 24, 1945.
- Paul E. Olsen was born in 1953.

=== Deaths ===
- Carroll Lane Fenton died in New Brunswick on 16th, November 1969.
- Richard H. Tedford died in Demarest on July 15, 2011.

== Natural history museums ==
- Morris Museum, Morristown
- New Jersey State Museum, Trenton
- Newark Museum, Newark
- Rutgers University Geology Museum, New Brunswick
- Edelman Fossil Park & Museum, Mantua Township

== Notable clubs and associations ==
- New Jersey Paleontological Society
- Delaware Valley Paleontological Society
- Monmouth Amateur Paleontologists Society

== See also ==
- Paleontology in New York
- Paleontology in Pennsylvania
