= List of fossiliferous stratigraphic units in Delaware =

This article contains a list of fossil-bearing stratigraphic units in the state of Delaware, U.S.

== Sites ==
Group or Formation	Period	Notes
Chesapeake Group/Calvert Formation	Neogene	
Crosswicks Clay	Cretaceous	
Englishtown Formation	Cretaceous	
Marshalltown Formation	Cretaceous	
Matawan Formation	Cretaceous	
Merchantville Formation	Cretaceous	
Mount Laurel Formation	Cretaceous	

== See also ==
- Paleontology in Delaware
