= English Town =

English Town may refer to:

- A town in England; see List of towns in England
- Englishtown (disambiguation), the name of various places
