= Paleontology in Washington =

Paleontology in Washington may refer to:

- Paleontology in Washington (state)
- Paleontology in Washington, D.C.
