= Crosswicks Clay =

Geological formation in Delaware

- Stratigraphic range: Cretaceous
- Type: Formation

Location
- Region: Delaware
- Country: United States

The Crosswicks Clay is a geologic formation in Delaware. It preserves fossils dating back to the Cretaceous period.

== See also ==
- List of fossiliferous stratigraphic units in Delaware
- Paleontology in Delaware
