= Englishtown =

Englishtown may refer to:

- Englishtown, New Jersey, United States, a borough
- Englishtown, Nova Scotia, an unincorporated area

== Townlands in Ireland ==
There are several townlands of this name on the island of Ireland. See:

- List of townlands of County Antrim
- List of townlands of County Galway
- List of townlands of County Limerick
- List of townlands of County Londonderry
- List of townlands of County Tipperary
- List of townlands of County Waterford
- List of townlands of County Wicklow

== See also ==
- Englishtown Formation, Delaware, United States, a geologic formation
