= Englishtown Formation =

Geologic formation in Delaware, United States

- Stratigraphic range: Cretaceous
- Type: Formation
- Underlies: Marshalltown Formation
- Overlies: Woodbury Formation

Location
- Region: Delaware
- Country: United States

The Englishtown Formation is a geologic formation in Delaware. It preserves fossils dating back to the Cretaceous period.

== See also ==
- List of fossiliferous stratigraphic units in Delaware
- Paleontology in Delaware
