= Woodbury Formation =

Geological formation in New Jersey

- Stratigraphic range: Early Campanian, 83.6–77.9 Ma
- Type: Geological formation
- Underlies: Englishtown Formation
- Overlies: Merchantville Formation
- Thickness: 15 m

Lithology
- Primary: Clay, Silt
- Other: Sand

Location
- Region: New Jersey
- Country: United States

The Woodbury Formation is a Mesozoic geologic formation in New Jersey, United States. It primarily consists of massive dark gray clays and silts with carbonized wood fragments and pyrite, deposited in a marine setting.

The remains of the dinosaur Hadrosaurus have been recovered from this formation.

Using radio isotope dating of bivalve shells, the formation has been dated to between 80.5 and 78.5 million years ago. However, a more accurate date make range from 83.6 to around 77.9 MYA.

== See also ==
- List of dinosaur-bearing rock formations
- List of stratigraphic units with few dinosaur genera
