= Paleontology in Maryland =

Paleontological research in the U.S. state of Maryland

The location of the state of Maryland

Paleontology in Maryland refers to paleontological research occurring within or conducted by people from the U.S. state of Maryland. The invertebrate fossils of Maryland are similar to those of neighboring Delaware. For most of the early Paleozoic era, Maryland was covered by a shallow sea, although it was above sea level for portions of the Ordovician and Devonian. The ancient marine life of Maryland included brachiopods and bryozoans while horsetails and scale trees grew on land. By the end of the era, the sea had left the state completely. In the early Mesozoic, Pangaea was splitting up. The same geologic forces that divided the supercontinent formed massive lakes. Dinosaur footprints were preserved along their shores. During the Cretaceous, the state was home to dinosaurs. During the early part of the Cenozoic era, the state was alternatingly submerged by sea water or exposed. During the Ice Age, mastodons lived in the state.

Local Delaware people told myths about a creature called the "Grandfather of the Monsters" and Little People that may have been inspired by local dinosaur footprints. By the 1850s, formal scientific investigation of the local fossils had commenced. Early discoveries included Astrodon, the first scientifically described sauropod from North America. Maryland was home to one of the most significant Pleistocene mammal discoveries in American history: the early 20th century discovery of Pleistocene fossils in an Allegany County cave. The Miocene murex snail Ecphora gardnerae gardnerae is the Maryland state fossil. Astrodon johnstoni is the state dinosaur of Maryland.

== Prehistory ==
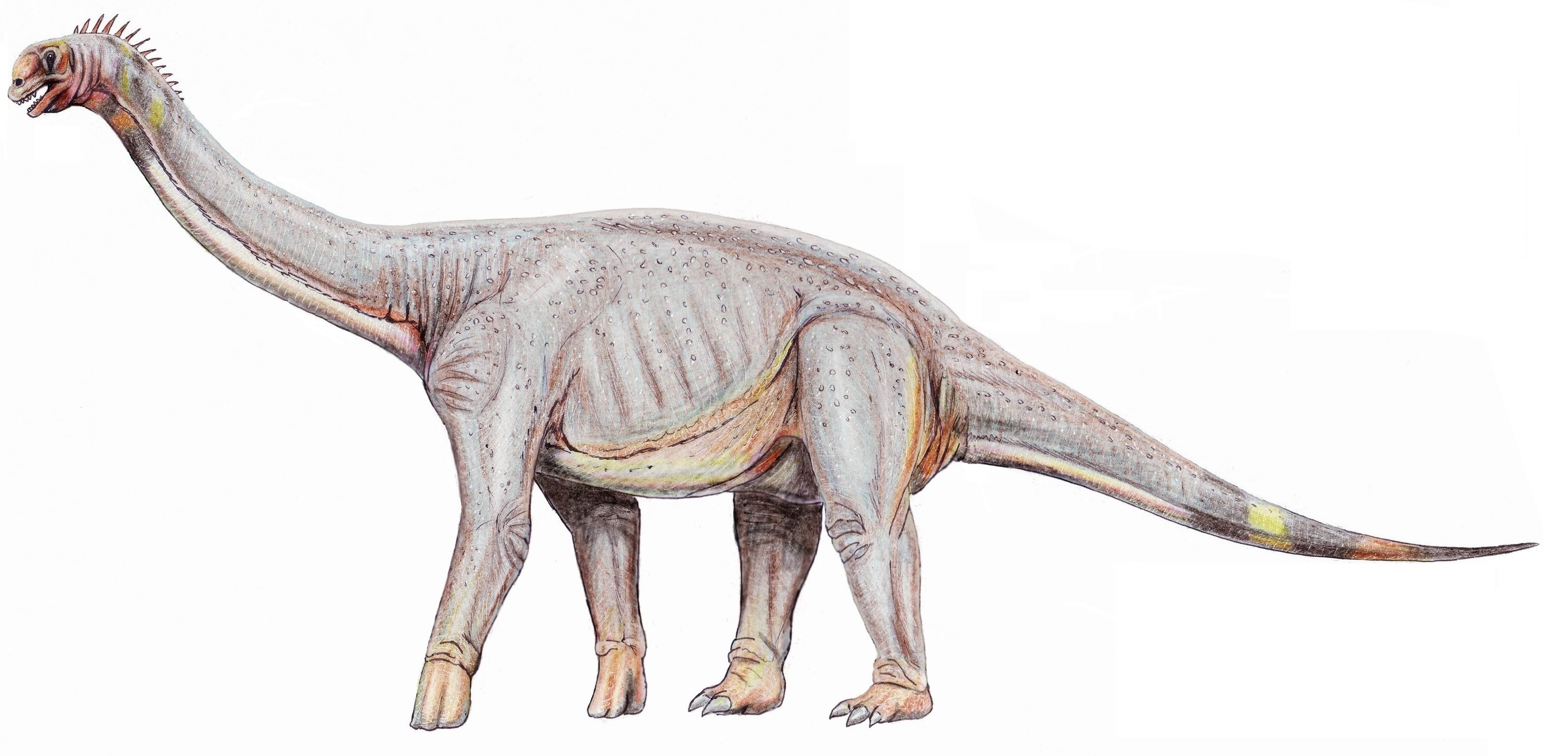
Astrodon.

No Precambrian fossils are known from Maryland. As such, the state's fossil record does not begin until the Paleozoic. Maryland was covered by a warm shallow sea during the Cambrian and Ordovician periods. Geologic forces elevated the state above sea level late in the latter period, although the seas later returned. During the Devonian another period of uplift raised the state out of the sea, before erosion and subsidence brought it back under. One final episode of uplift during the Paleozoic occurred at the boundary between the Carboniferous and Permian. Maryland was home to creatures like brachiopods and bryozoans during periods where the state was under seawater. While the sea was absent, horsetails and scale trees grew across the state. Maryland was hot and humid during the late Paleozoic. By the end of the era the state was almost entirely a terrestrial environment.

During the Mesozoic powerful geologic forces were splitting the supercontinent of Pangaea. These same forces formed rifts in Maryland. Lakes and river formed in these rifts. Elements of the local flora would end up fossilized in sediments deposited by these same bodies of water. The first of two dinosaur footprint bearing formations in Maryland were laid down during the Late Triassic on sediments that later became the Gettysburg Formation north of Emmitsburg in Frederick County. For a 30 million year interval spanning the Late Triassic-Early Jurassic boundary, the Culpeper Basin was an extensive lake.

Sea levels fluctuated during the ensuing Cretaceous period. Sometimes Maryland was subemerged under the sea and sometimes it was exposed as dry land. Contemporary marine life included brachiopods and molluscs. Maryland and Washington, D.C. are the only places where Early Cretaceous dinosaur remains are known to have been preserved east of the Mississippi River. The only known Late Cretaceous dinosaur fossils discovered in Maryland were found in the Severn Formation of Prince George's County east of Washington, D.C. Many Late Cretaceous sharks such as Squalicorax are found in the Severn formation, as well as the occasional Mosasaur fossil.

During the ensuing Tertiary period of the Cenozoic era, sea levels also varied substantially. During the Paleocene Maryland was home to at least 10 different kinds of ostracods. During the Miocene, Maryland was home to the sea turtle Bothremys, which may have fed by crushing snails. The famed Chesapeake group exposes along the coast of Calvert County is known for its diverse Marine Mammal fauna. Many species of shark swam over Calvert County, including Otodus megalodon which was the largest shark ever to exist. The large amount of juveniles may mean it was a breeding or nursing ground for them. The Chesapeake group is also home to Maryland's state fossil, Ecphora gardenerae was one of the first described fossils in North America. It is known for its fragility and distinctive color, and recently was discovered to hold remnants of the original proteins from the living animal.

Glaciers never reached Maryland during the later Ice Age. However, they still affected the local environment as when water was trapped frozen in glaciers it caused the local sea levels to drop. The local climate was cold and the area often received snow. Because of this, the local flora were correspondingly different. The local wildlife was also different and included such animals as mastodons, mammoths, and smilodon. During warmer periods the glaciers would melt and sea levels rise. Clams, oysters, mussels, and snails lived in these higher waters and were preserved in the eastern part of the state. On land, Pleistocene Maryland was home to a great diversity of mammals. During the middle of that epoch, Maryland was covered in a moist woodland habitat. Around this time a cavity in the limestone composing an Allegany County hill served as a death trap for many unwary animals over an extended period. Among the preserved remains were animals from very warm, intermediate and very cold climates, documenting the changes in the make up of the local wildlife in response to the planet's changing climate. The mammals typifying the warm southern fauna included some of the bats, peccaries, and a tapir. A crocodile discovered in the cave showed evidence of reptilian megafauna existing in the state in prehistory. The intermediate latitude-type fauna was characterized by a badger, a variety of bears, deer, a mastodon, otter, and a puma-like animal. The mammals more typical of northern habitats included elk, a fisher, hare, lemming, mink, jumping mouse, muskrat, pika, porcupine, long-tailed shrew, red squirrel, and wolverine. Large animals are conspicuously absent from the deposit and few of the fossils suggest anything larger than a modern black bear. Also conspicuous is the absence of many kinds of animal that are common in the Pleistocene deposits in the United States like bison, camels, giant ground sloths, grizzly bears, and musk oxen.

== History ==
=== Indigenous interpretations ===
The Lenape or Delaware people have lived in Maryland and told myths likely influenced by the theropod dinosaur tracks common in the area. They believed that in the early days of earth's history the land and sea were full of Monsters. The grandfather of these Monsters was the most terrifying Monster of all and menaced all living creatures. He was so huge that when he crossed the mountains he left footprints in solid rock. The creature was eventually killed by lightning after being trapped in a mountain pass. Folklorist Adrienne Mayor has mused that the depiction of the grandfather of the Monsters in the Delaware myth resembles modern portrayals of Tyrannosaurus rex as a fearless, superlative predator. The Delaware also had a fossil related custom where the women of the tribe collected "uki rocks" which were imprinted with the tracks of small dinosaurs. The Lenape attributed these footprints to mythical Little People. They believed that placing the trace fossil-bearing uki rocks along the edges of their fields would benefit their crops.

=== Scientific research ===
In 1859, state agricultural chemist Philip T. Tyson discovered the first dinosaur fossils of the Arundel Formation in an iron pit at Bladensburg, Prince George's County. The discovery consisted of two Early Cretaceous fossil teeth. Around the same time Tyson also discovered the Arundel Formation's first known fossil cycad trunks.[84] Tyson took the dinosaur teeth to a local doctor named Christopher Johnston. Johnston cut thin sections of one tooth to examine it under a microscope. He published a paper titled "Note Upon Odontography" in the American Journal of Dental Science. Johnson named the teeth Astrodon. In 1865 Joseph Leidy formally named the species Astrodon johnstoni after Christopher Johnston. This represents the first formal naming of a sauropod species in North America.

In late 1887 Othniel Charles Marsh sent John Bell Hatcher to look for dinosaur remains in the Arundel Clay. While on this expedition, Hatcher discovered an iron mine on a farm near Muirkirk owned by a man named William Coffin. This mine was nicknamed Swampoodle by the locals and became the best source of Early Cretaceous dinosaur fossils on the east coast of the US. Hatcher did most of his Maryland excavations during the winter, which was particularly harsh that year. Early in 1888, Hatcher continued his grueling winter excavations of Arundel Clay dinosaur fossils. His efforts helped the region between Maryland and Washington D.C. become known as Dinosaur Alley. Hatcher recovered hundreds of bones and teeth, although the remains were poorly preserved, disarticulated and often from animals who weren't fully grown. Later in 1888, Marsh named five new species of dinosaurs based on the remains uncovered by Hatcher's 1887-1887 expedition to the Arundel Clay deposits of Dinosaur Alley. They were the ankylosaur Priconodon crassus, the sauropods Pleurocoelus altus and Pleurocoelus nanus, and the theropods Allosaurus medius and Coelurus gracilis. Although these remains are now regarded as Early Cretaceous, at the time Marsh thought them to be Late Jurassic.

In 1894, Arthur Bibbins was hired by the Woman's College of Baltimore (now known as Goucher College) to teach biology, geology, and curate their museum. Bibbins began collecting fossils from the Arundel Clay that year and demonstrated significant skill in finding the trunks of fossil cycads. During the summer of 1894, Bibbins learned that more dinosaur bones had been discovered locally both in the same iron mine Marsh had prospected and new localities. Bibbins began prospecting these sites and quickly amassed a sizable collection of dinosaur bones, although he described the excavation work as "attended by much difficulty". The only known dinosaur footprints in Maryland were discovered the next year in 1895 by James A. Mitchell in a Frederick County quarry north of Emmitsburg. The prints were preserved in the rock of the Late Triassic Gettysburg Formation. In addition to discovering them he also illustrated them.

Early in the twentieth century, Maryland was home to one of the most significant Pleistocene mammal discoveries in American history. In 1912, workers digging in a cave for a railroad construction project about four miles west of Cumberland in Allegany County uncovered and incidentally destroyed many fossils in the course of their labor. However, eventually the scientific significance of the fossils was realized and paleontologist J. W. Gidley conducted fieldwork at the cave between 1912 and 1915.

In 1965 the collection of fossils belonging to Goucher College, for whom Arthur Bibbins had collected cycad and dinosaur fossils, were permanently loaned to the National Museum of Natural History at the Smithsonian.

After J. W. Gidley's 1931 death, his son continued his father's work researching the fossils found in the Allegany County Cave. In 1938 the younger Gidley published a significant report on the subject in the scientific literature. The fossils obtained there are now curated by the Smithsonian Institution. By the time of the 1938 report more than 50 different kinds of animals had been identified among the fossils. This variety included many animal groups that would have seemed much more typical of significantly higher or lower latitudes. Most of the animals were relatively small and some Pleistocene life forms common in other parts of the country were strangely absent.

In 1952, the first known Paleocene deposits of Maryland were documented in Prince George's County. By early 1954 ten different species of ostracods had been described from those deposits. Later, in 1966 researchers from the Carnegie Museum performed fieldwork at Scientists' Point on the Chesapeake Bay looking for invertebrate fossils. More recently, in 1998, Astrodon johnstoni was designated the state dinosaur of Maryland.

== People ==
- R. S. Lull was born in Annapolis on November 6, 1867.

== Natural history museums ==
- Maryland Science Center, Baltimore
- Natural History Society of Maryland, Baltimore
- Peale Museum, Baltimore
- Calvert Marine Museum, Solomons

== Notable clubs and associations ==
- Maryland Geological Society
- Calvert Marine Museum Fossil Club

== See also ==
- Paleontology in Delaware
- Paleontology in Pennsylvania
- Paleontology in Virginia
- Paleontology in Washington, D.C.
- Paleontology in West Virginia
