= Paleontology in Washington, D.C. =

Study of ancient life in Washington, D.C.

The location of Washington, D.C.

Local paleontology in Washington, D.C., is known primarily for two serendipitously discovered dinosaur fossils. The first was a vertebra from a carnivorous dinosaur nicknamed "Capitalsaurus" that was related to Tyrannosaurus rex. "Capitalsaurus" is the official dinosaur of the District of Columbia; the place it was discovered was named Capitalsaurus Court in its honor and it even has its own local holiday. The second major fossil find was a thighbone from the long-necked sauropod Astrodon. The District of Columbia and Maryland are the only places where Early Cretaceous dinosaur remains are known to have been preserved east of the Mississippi River.

== History ==
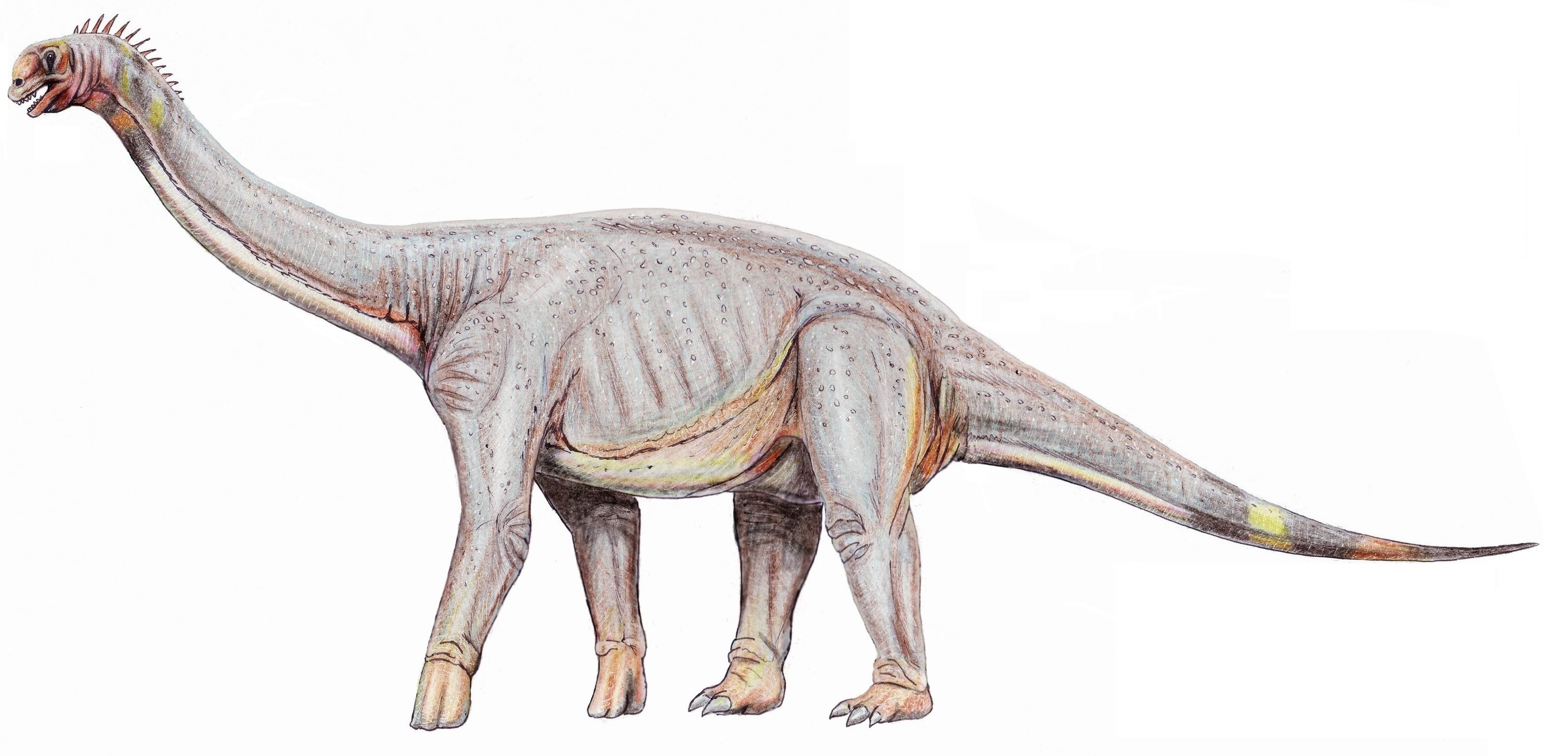
Astrodon

Early in the history of local paleontology, 1846 was significant as the year the US National Museum was founded. A few decades later, in January 1898, a vertebra and some other fragmentary remains of a large theropod dinosaur were discovered by workers attempting to install a sewer line at First and F Streets SE. The fossils were donated to the Smithsonian by J. K. Murphy on the 28th of that month and assigned the specimen number NMNH 3049. The remains belonged to a carnivorous dinosaur related to Tyrannosaurus rex that was nicknamed "Capitalsaurus". Capitalsaurus is endemic to the federal district and known from nowhere else on earth. It lived in the Washington, D.C. area about 110 million years ago, when the area resembled modern southern Louisiana.

Significant events from the early 20th century included the 1916 transfer of the fossil collection curated by the Goucher College museum to the US National Museum at the Smithsonian. Less than a decade later, in 1923, renowned paleontologist Charles W. Gilmore became curator of the museum. In 1942, near the end of Gilmore's career, a sizable thigh bone belonging to Astrodon was discovered during construction at the McMillan Water Filtration Plant. Just three years later, in 1945, Gilmore's time as curator of the US National Museum ended. On September 30, 1998 Capitalsaurus was recognized as the official dinosaur of Washington, D.C. On January 28, 2000, the 102nd anniversary of the discovery of and donation to the Smithsonian of Capitalsaurus the site of its discovery was formally named Capitalsaurus Court. On the next anniversary of the discovery mayor Anthony A. Williams declared it a local holiday, "Capitalsaurus Day".

== People ==
=== Births ===
- Alpheus Hyatt was born on April 5, 1838.
- Gregory S. Paul was born on 24 December, 1954.

=== Deaths ===
- Remington Kellogg died on 8 May 1969 at age 76.
- Edward Oscar Ulrich died on 22 February 1944.
- Charles Doolittle Walcott died on February 9, 1927 at age 76.

== Natural history museums ==
- National Geographic Museum at Explorers Hall
- National Museum of Natural History, Smithsonian Institution

== See also ==
- Paleontology in Maryland
- Paleontology in Virginia
- Paleontology in West Virginia
