= Merchantville Formation =

Geological Formation in the United States

- Stratigraphic range: Late Cretaceous, late Santonian to early Campanian
- Type: Geological formation
- Underlies: Woodbury Formation
- Overlies: Cheesequake Formation and Magothy Formation

Location
- Region: North America
- Country: United States

Type section
- Named for: Merchantville, New Jersey

The Merchantville Formation is a geological formation in the northeastern United States whose strata date back to the Late Cretaceous, around the time of the Santonian and Campanian age. Dinosaur remains are among the fossils that have been recovered from the formation.

== Vertebrate fauna ==
- Tyrannosauroidea (Dryptosauridae) indet. (="Cryptotyrannus")
- Hadrosauridae indet. (="Atlantohadros")
- Hadrosaurus foulkii
- Bothremys cooki
- Mosasaurus sp.
- Ornithomimidae indet.
- Pteranodon sp?

== See also ==
- List of dinosaur-bearing rock formations
