= Paleontology in Delaware =

Paleontological research in the U.S. state of Delaware

The location of the state of Delaware

Paleontology in Delaware refers to paleontological research occurring within or conducted by people from the U.S. state of Delaware. There are no local rocks of Precambrian, Paleozoic, Triassic, or Jurassic age, so Delaware's fossil record does not begin until the Cretaceous period. As the Early Cretaceous gave way to the Late Cretaceous, Delaware was being gradually submerged by the sea. Local marine life included cephalopods like Belemnitella americana, and marine reptiles. The dwindling local terrestrial environments were home to a variety of plants, dinosaurs, and pterosaurs. Along with New Jersey, Delaware is one of the best sources of Late Cretaceous dinosaur fossils in the eastern United States. Delaware was still mostly covered by sea water through the Cenozoic era. Local marine life included manatees, porpoises, seals, and whales. Delaware was worked over by glaciers during the Ice Age. The Cretaceous belemnite Belemnitella americana is the Delaware state fossil.

== Prehistory ==
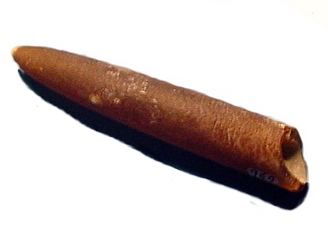
Belemnitella.

No fossils are known from the rocks of the Precambrian or Paleozoic of Delaware because the rocks are metamorphic in origin. Fossils are also locally absent from the Triassic and Jurassic period since there are no local rocks of these ages in which they might be preserved. However, Cretaceous rocks and fossils are known. During the transition between the Early and Late Cretaceous, Delaware was changing from a terrestrial environment to a shallow sea. A variety of local plants left behind abundant fossils in the state's contemporary terrestrial environments. Local animals included hadrosaur and ornithomimid dinosaurs, and pterosaurs. Meanwhile, fossils of other reptiles include the alligator-related Deinosuchus and mosasaurs, like Globidens. Cretaceous invertebrates of Delaware included annelids, cephalopods, crustaceans, gastropods, and pelecypods. One of the most common Cretaceous invertebrate species found in the state is the crab Callianassa mortoni, whose claws are abundant in the Merchantville Formation. Notable cephalopods of Cretaceous Delaware included the swift swimming belemnite Belemnitella americana. Cretaceous trace fossils include the mysterious tube-like Halymenites major. Marine reptiles inhabited the sea that came to expand over the state. Along with New Jersey, Delaware is one of the best sources of Late Cretaceous dinosaur fossils in the eastern United States.

Delaware continued to be largely covered by seawater during the Cenozoic era, although its level rose and fell over time. Local marine life included manatees, porpoises, seals, and whales. On land, the state was home to bears, beavers, dogs, and snakes. About 17.5 million years ago, more than 100 kinds of mollusks lived in the waters off the Delaware coast. Local marine vertebrates included bony fishes, porpoises, rays, sea cows, sharks, sea turtles, and whales. Fossil pollen suggests that the state's Miocene coastal regions were less marshy than they are today. Local vegetation included forests composed of oaks, palms, and pines. The climate may have resembled that of modern Georgia's southern half. On land, the local inhabitants included beavers, a possible saber-toothed cat, chalicotheres, deer-like animals, rabbits, peccaries, hornless rhinoceroses, and small primitive horses. Local Ice Age glacial activity made significant sedimentary deposits, but these preserved few fossils.

== History ==
=== Indigenous interpretations ===
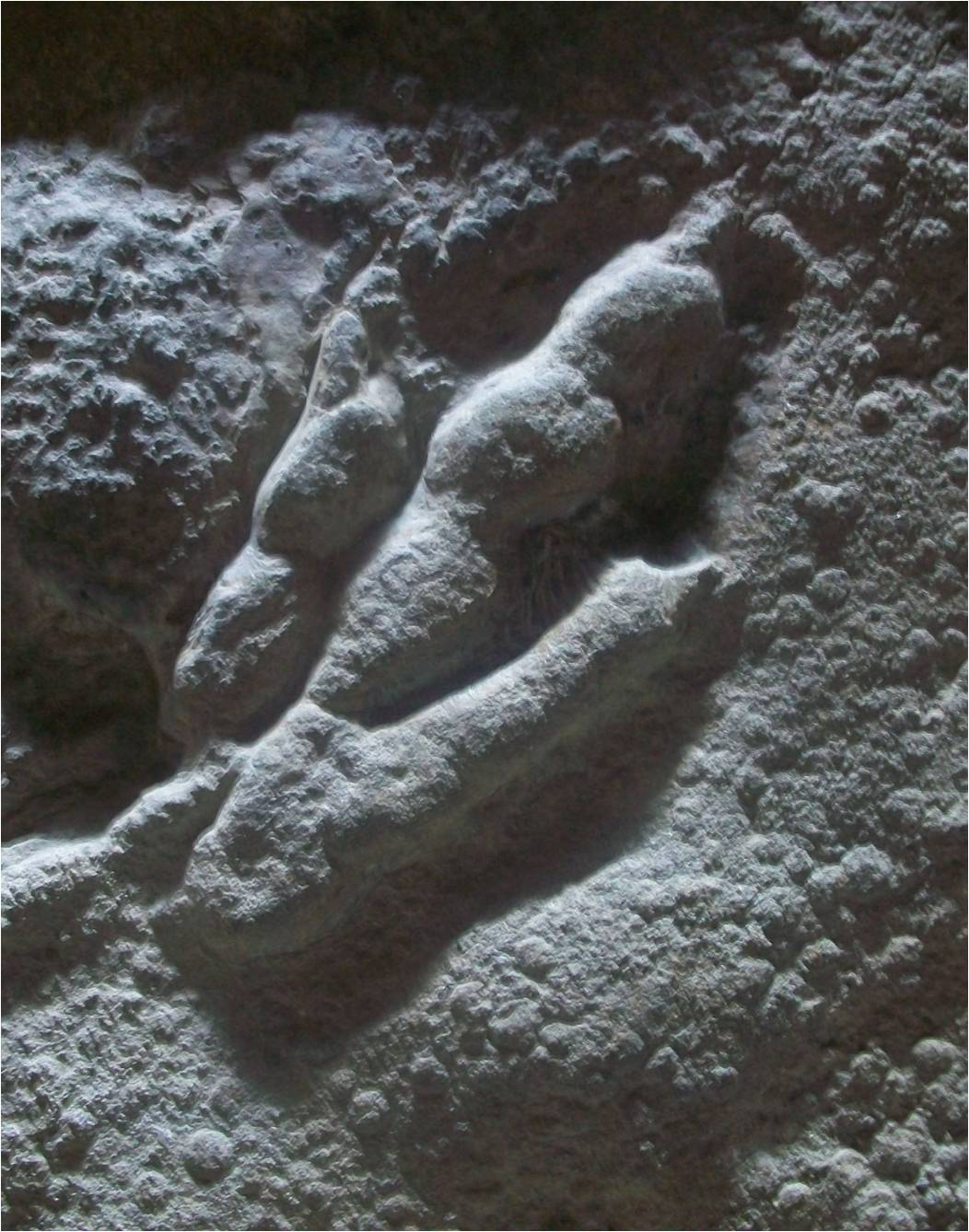
Grallator.

The Lenape or Delaware people have lived in Delaware and told myths likely influenced by the theropod dinosaur tracks common in the area. They believed that in the early days of earth's history the land and sea were full of Monsters. The grandfather of these Monsters was the most terrifying Monster of all and menaced all living creatures. He was so huge that when he crossed the mountains he left footprints in solid rock. The creature was eventually killed by lightning after being trapped in a mountain pass. Folklorist Adrienne Mayor has mused that the depiction of the grandfather of the Monsters in the Delaware myth resembles modern portrayals of Tyrannosaurus rex as a fearless, superlative predator. The Delaware people also used to have a custom related to fossil footprints. Delaware women once collected "uki rocks" which were imprinted with the tracks of small dinosaurs attributed to mythical Little People. They believed that placing the trace fossil-bearing uki rocks along the edges of their fields would benefit their crops.

=== Scientific research ===
In the summer of 1991, highway workers digging for a construction project near Smyrna made a major Miocene fossil deposit. Although most of its fossils were of marine life, researchers have regarded its mammal remains as the best discovered north of Florida in the eastern United States. Excavators dug 50 feet into the sediment to uncover both invertebrate and vertebrate remains. Invertebrates included more than a 100 kinds of marine mollusks, roughly a quarter of which were previously undescribed. The site's famous mammals included beavers, a possible saber-toothed cat, chalicotheres, deer-like animals, rabbits, peccaries, hornless rhinoceroses, and small primitive horses. The deposit may have formed as terrestrial animal carcasses bloated and drifted downstream and out to sea, mingling their remains with those of marine life. Alternatively they may have died and been buried on land only to be eroded out of the sediments by the action of the sea.

== Natural history museums ==
- Delaware Museum of Nature & Science, Wilmington
- University of Delaware Mineralogical Museum, Newark
- Iron Hill Museum, Newark

== See also ==
- Paleontology in Maryland
