= Kryptohadros =

Kryptohadros Temporal range: Late Cretaceous, Maastrichtian
- Life reconstruction

Scientific classification
- Kingdom: Animalia
- Phylum: Chordata
- Class: Reptilia
- Clade: Dinosauria
- Clade: †Ornithischia
- Clade: †Ornithopoda
- Clade: †Telmatosauridae
- Genus: †Kryptohadros; Magyar et al., 2026
- Species: †K. kallaiae

Binomial name
- †Kryptohadros kallaiae Magyar et al., 2026

Genus of ornithopod dinosaurs

Kryptohadros (lit. 'hidden hadrosauroid') is an extinct genus of hadrosauroid ornithopod dinosaur known from the Late Cretaceous (Maastrichtian age) Densuș-Ciula Formation of Romania. The genus contains a single species, Kryptohadros kallaiae, known from a partial skull and skeleton. Phylogenetic analyses revealed Kryptohadros is closely related to the coeval Transylvanian Telmatosaurus and the Italian Tethyshadros, together forming a group of southeastearn European-endemic taxa, called the Telmatosauridae. Kryptohadros is the second named non-hadrosaurid hadrosauroid from the Hațeg Basin, following Telmatosaurus, which was named by Franz Nopcsa in 1903.

== Discovery and naming ==
The Kryptohadros holotype specimen, LPB [FGGUB] R.2882, was discovered between 2022 and 2024 in the Fântânele-3 site of the uppermost Densuș-Ciula Formation in the westernmost part of Hunedoara County, Romania. The associated fossil material preserves a partial skull, dorsal rib fragments, caudals, neural spine fragment, chevrons, and a partial hindlimb. The fused vertebral column elements and the size of the known material indicate that the fossil belongs to an individual that at least reached a subadult stage.

In 2026, János Magyar and colleagues described this incomplete skeleton as a new genus and species of hadrosauroid, Kryptohadros kallaiae. The generic name, Kryptohadros, is derived from the Ancient Greek words κρυπτός (kryptós, "hidden"), regarding its presence as a second hadrosauroid taxon of the Hațeg Basin in close proximity to a previously known fossil locality being unrecognized for decades, and ἁδρός (hadrós, "thick" or "bulky"), which is often used to name hadrosauroids. The specific name, kallaiae, honors Magyar's mother, Csilla Kállai.

== Classification ==
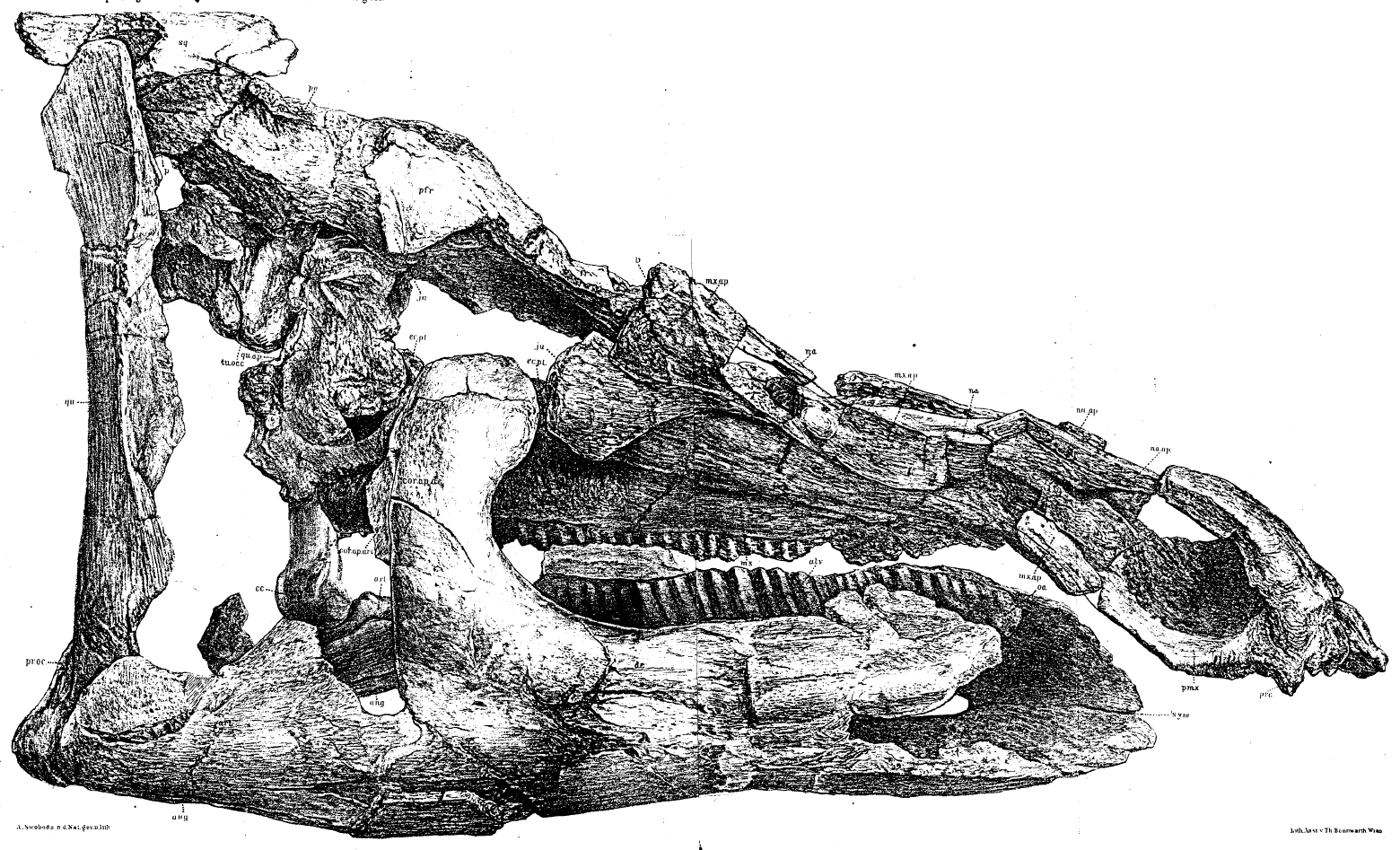
Skull of the closely related Telmatosaurus

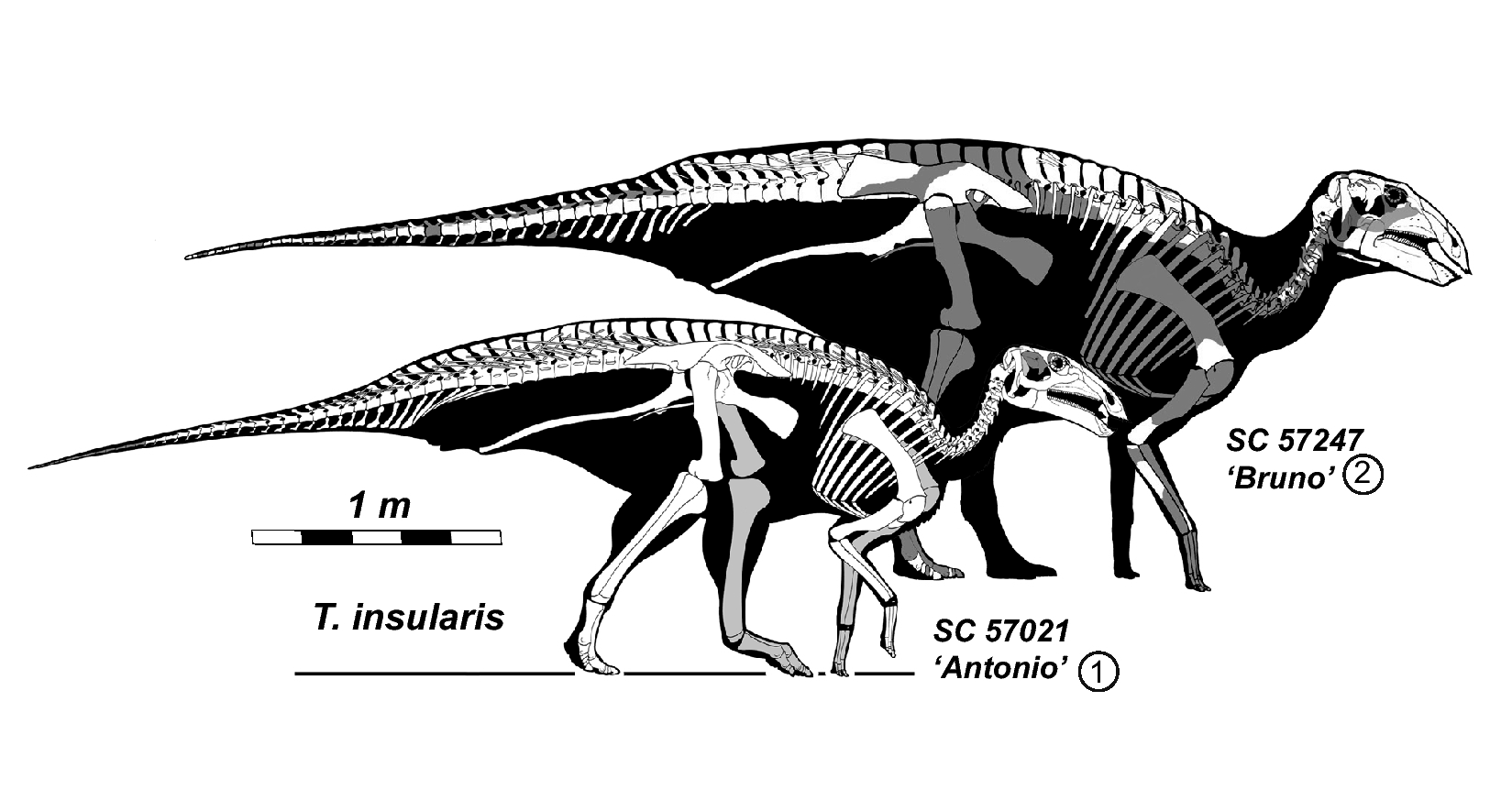
Reconstructed skeletons of the closely related Tethyshadros

To test the relationships and affinities of Kryptohadros, Magyar and colleagues included it in an updated version of the phylogenetic matrix of Longrich et al. (2024) and the similar but less extensive matrix of Dai et al. (2025). Both datasets consistently recovered Kryptohadros as the sister taxon to the Italian genus Tethyshadros. Telmatosaurus, another genus from Hațeg Basin coeval with Kryptohadros, was recovered as the sister to these two taxa using both datasets. Magyar et al. named the group containing these three genera as the new clade Telmatosauridae. The results of the majority rule consensus analysis from the former matrix are displayed in the cladogram below:

- Hadrosauroidea
  - Mantellisaurus atherfieldensis
  - - Ouranosaurus nigeriensis
    - - Jinzhousaurus yangi
      - - Equijubus normani
        - - Sirindhorna khoratensis
          - - Xuwulong yueluni
            - - - Probactrosaurus gobiensis
                - Zuoyunlong huangi
                - - Batyrosaurus rozhdestvenskyi
                  - Jintasaurus meniscus
              - Hadrosauromorpha
                - - Eolambia caroljonesa
                  - Protohadros byrdi
                - - Yunganglong datongensis
                  - - Levnesovia transoxiana
                    - - Tanius sinensis
                      - - Nanyangosaurus zhugeii
                        - - - Bactrosaurus johnsoni
                            - Fylax thyrakolasus
                          - - Gilmoreosaurus mongoliensis
                            - Shuangmiaosaurus gilmorei
                          - - Nanningosaurus dashiensis
                            - - Claosaurus agilis
                              - - Telmatosauridae
                                  - Telmatosaurus transsylvanicus
                                  - - Kryptohadros kallaiae
                                    - Tethyshadros insularis
                                - - - Plesiohadros djadokhtaensis
                                    - - Gobihadros mongoliensis
                                      - Penelopognathus weishampeli
                                  - - Eotrachodon orientalis
                                    - - Zhanghenglong yangchengensis
                                      - - - Huehuecanauhtlus tiquichensis
                                          - Jeyawati rugoculus
                                        - Hadrosauridae
                                          ⊞
                                          - Hadrosaurus foulkii
                                          - Euhadrosauria
                                            - Saurolophinae
                                              ⊞
                                              - Wulagasaurus dongi
                                              - - Brachylophosaurini
                                                - - Kritosaurini
                                                  - - Edmontosaurini
                                                    - Saurolophini
                                              ⊟
                                            - Lambeosaurinae
                                              ⊞
                                              - Aralosaurus tuberiferus
                                              - Jaxartosaurus aralensis
                                              - Nipponosaurus sachalinensis
                                              - - Tsintaosaurus spinorhinus
                                                - - Arenysaurini
                                                  - Corythosauria
                                                    - Lambeosaurini
                                                    - Parasaurolophini
                                              ⊟
                                          ⊟
