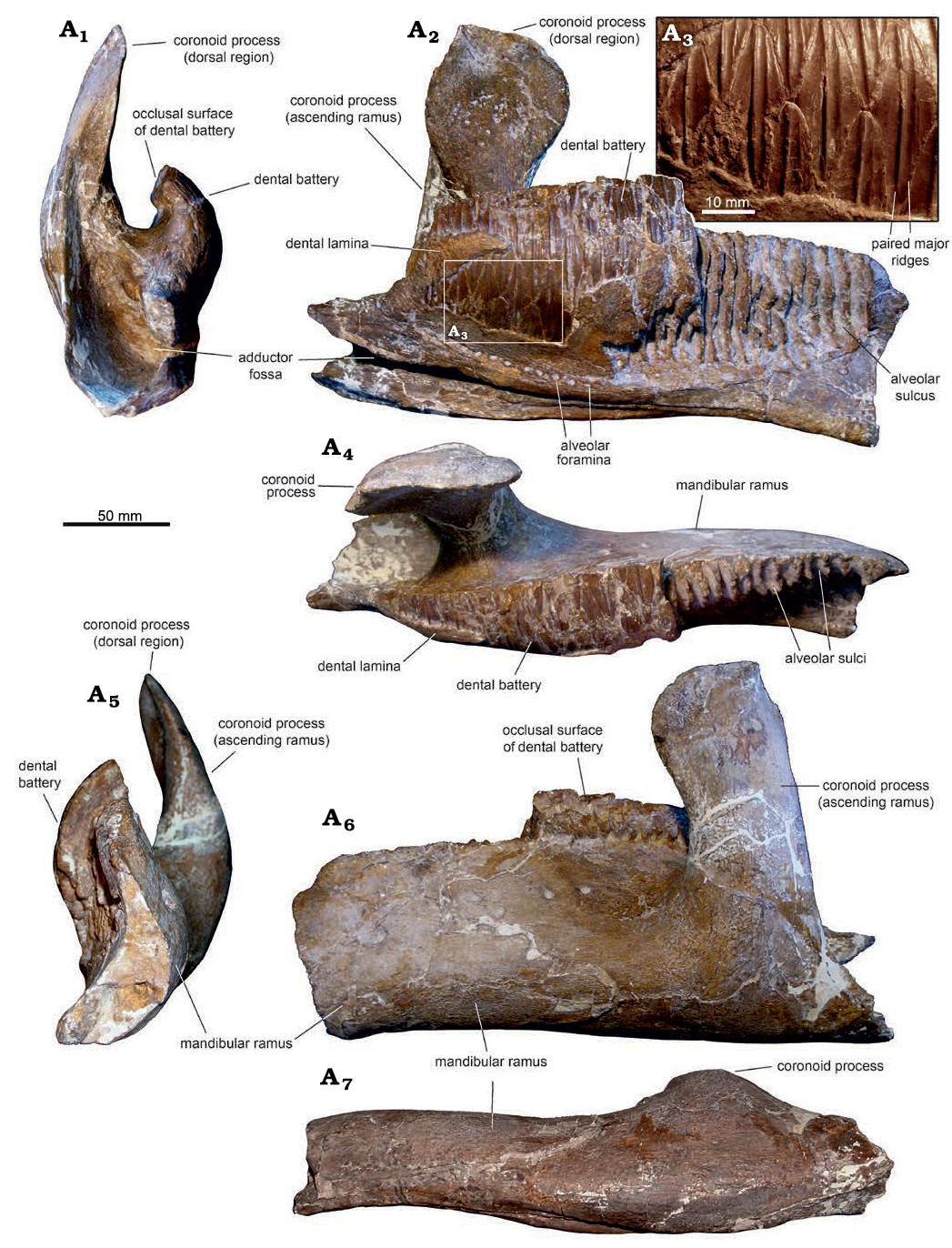
- Holotype dentary from multiple angles

Scientific classification
- Kingdom: Animalia
- Phylum: Chordata
- Class: Reptilia
- Clade: Dinosauria
- Clade: †Ornithischia
- Clade: †Ornithopoda
- Clade: †Hadrosauromorpha
- Genus: †Fylax; Prieto-Márquez & Carrera Farias, 2021
- Species: †F. thyrakolasus

Binomial name
- †Fylax thyrakolasus Prieto-Márquez & Carrera Farias, 2021

= Fylax =

Fylax Temporal range: Late Cretaceous, 66.052–66 Ma

Genus of hadrosauroid dinosaur from the Late Cretaceous period

Fylax (meaning "keeper") is a genus of hadrosauroid ornithopod from the Late Cretaceous Figuerola Formation of Spain. The genus contains a single species, Fylax thyrakolasus, known from a nearly complete left dentary.

== Discovery and naming ==
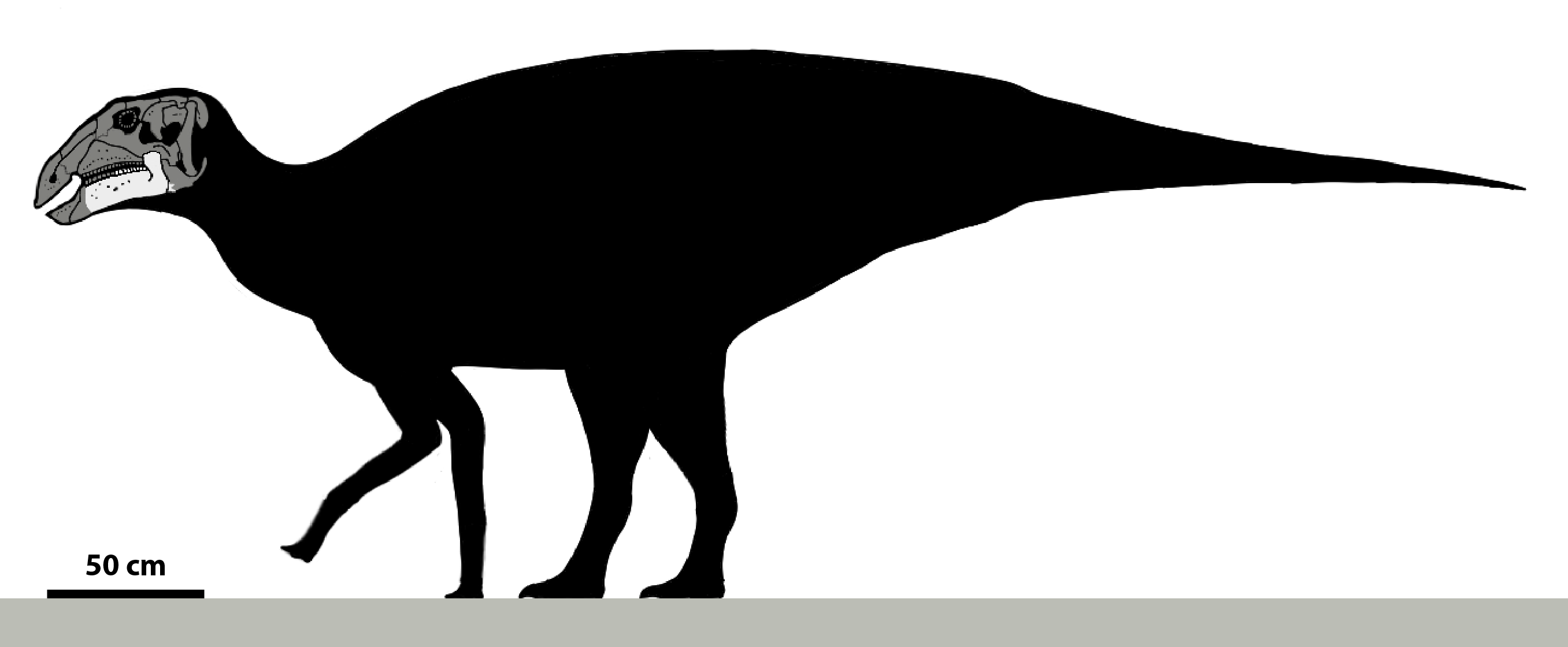
Reconstructed skeleton based on Tethyshadros, with the preserved dentary in white

The holotype of Fylax, IPS-36338, a left dentary, was discovered in the early 1990s. It was found in the Figuerola Formation in Lleida province, northeastern Spain. It was initially described in 1999.

In 2021, Albert Prieto-Márquez and Miguel Ángel Carrera Farias described the dentary as belonging to a new genus of hadrosauroid dinosaur. The generic name, Fylax, comes from the modern Greek, fýlax (keeper), and the specific name, thyrakolasus, comes from the Greek thýra (gate) and kólasi (hell), thus creating the combination "keeper of the gates of hell” in reference to the proximity of this taxon to the Cretaceous-Paleogene mass extinction event.

== Classification ==
Prieto-Márquez and Carrera Farias (2021) recovered Fylax as the sister taxon to Tethyshadros in a derived position in the Hadrosauromorpha, making it one of the latest surviving non-hadrosaurid hadrosauromorphs. Their cladogram is shown below:

- Hadrosauromorpha
  - - Jeyawati
    - - Eolambia
      - Protohadros
  - - Tanius
    - - Bactrosaurus
      - - Gilmoreosaurus
        - - - Lophorhothon
            - - Penelopognathus
              - Telmatosaurus
          - - Claosaurus
            - - - Fylax
                - Tethyshadros
              - - Plesiohadros
                - - Eotrachodon
                  - Hadrosauridae

In their 2026 description of Kryptohadros, Magyar and colleagues included Fylax in an updated version of the phylogenetic matrix of Longrich et al. (2024) and the similar but less extensive matrix of Dai et al. (2025). Both datasets failed to recover a close relationship between Fylax and Tethyshadros, as initially proposed in 2021. Instead, Tethyhadros was recovered as the sister taxon of Kryptohadros in a clade also containing Telmatosaurus, deemed the Telmatosauridae. Using the latter matrix, Fylax was placed in a more derived position, as an early-diverging member of the Hadrosauridae. The majority rule tree using the dataset of Longrich et al. (2024) placed Fylax in a more basal position, as the sister taxon to the Chinese Bactrosaurus. These results are displayed in the cladogram below:

- Hadrosauromorpha
  - - Eolambia caroljonesa
    - Protohadros byrdi
  - - Yunganglong datongensis
    - - Levnesovia transoxiana
      - - Tanius sinensis
        - - Nanyangosaurus zhugeii
          - - - Bactrosaurus johnsoni
              - Fylax thyrakolasus
            - - Gilmoreosaurus mongoliensis
              - Shuangmiaosaurus gilmorei
            - - Nanningosaurus dashiensis
              - - Claosaurus agilis
                - - Telmatosauridae
                    - Telmatosaurus transsylvanicus
                    - - Kryptohadros kallaiae
                      - Tethyshadros insularis
                  - - - Plesiohadros djadokhtaensis
                      - - Gobihadros mongoliensis
                        - Penelopognathus weishampeli
                    - - Eotrachodon orientalis
                      - - Zhanghenglong yangchengensis
                        - - - Huehuecanauhtlus tiquichensis
                            - Jeyawati rugoculus
                          - Hadrosauridae
                            ⊞
                            - Hadrosaurus foulkii
                            - Euhadrosauria
                              - Saurolophinae
                                ⊞
                                - Wulagasaurus dongi
                                - - Brachylophosaurini
                                  - - Kritosaurini
                                    - - Edmontosaurini
                                      - Saurolophini
                                ⊟
                              - Lambeosaurinae
                                ⊞
                                - Aralosaurus tuberiferus
                                - Jaxartosaurus aralensis
                                - Nipponosaurus sachalinensis
                                - - Tsintaosaurus spinorhinus
                                  - - Arenysaurini
                                    - Corythosauria
                                      - Lambeosaurini
                                      - Parasaurolophini
                                ⊟
                            ⊟
