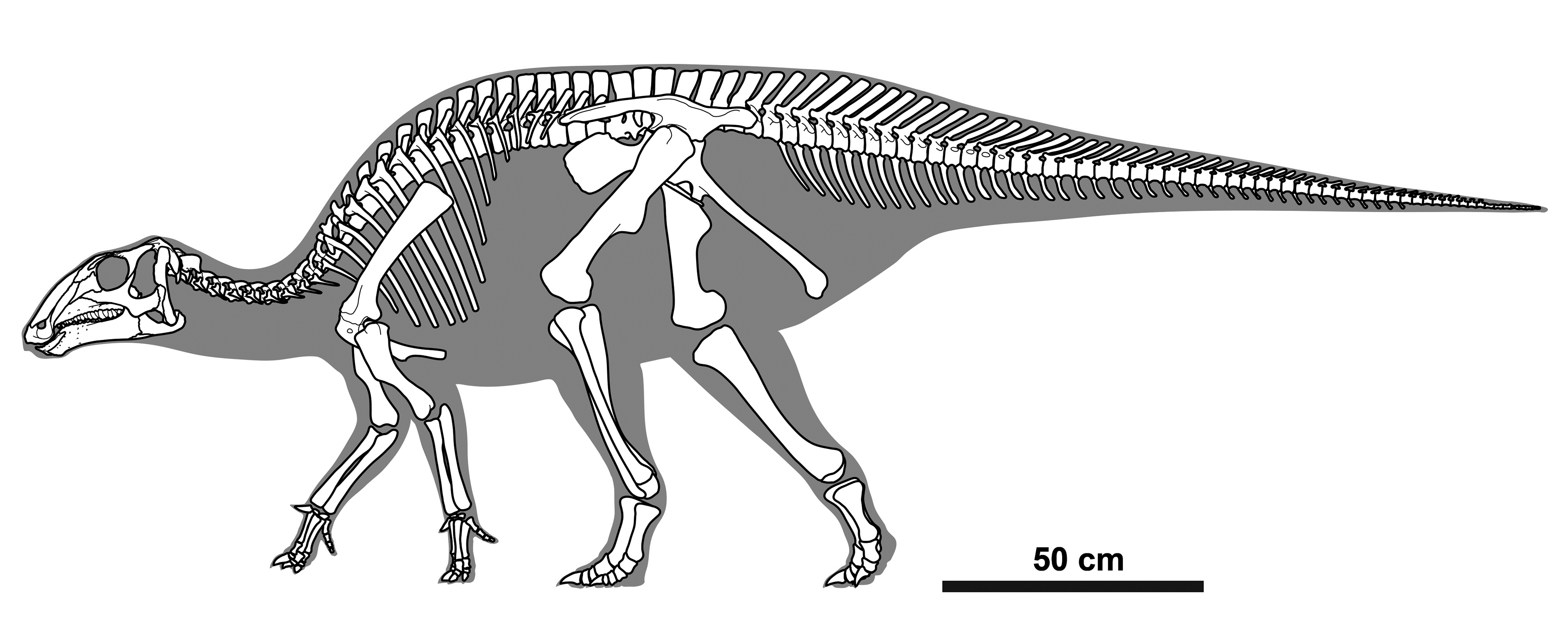
- Skeleton of Gobihadros

Scientific classification
- Kingdom: Animalia
- Phylum: Chordata
- Class: Reptilia
- Clade: Dinosauria
- Clade: †Ornithischia
- Clade: †Ornithopoda
- Clade: †Hadrosauriformes
- Superfamily: †Hadrosauroidea
- Clade: †Hadrosauromorpha; Norman, 2015 vide Norman, 2014

Subgroups
- †Bactrosaurus; †Claosaurus; †Eolambia; †Fylax; †Gilmoreosaurus; †Glishades?; †Gobihadros; †Gonkoken; †Huehuecanauhtlus; †Jeyawati; †Jintasaurus; †Levnesovia; †Lophorhothon; †Nanningosaurus; †Nanyangosaurus; †Orthomerus?; †Plesiohadros; †Protohadros; †Tanius; †Yunganglong; †Zhanghenglong; †Telmatosauridae; †Kryptohadros; †Telmatosaurus; †Tethyshadros; †Hadrosauridae

= Hadrosauromorpha =

Hadrosauromorphs Temporal range: Late Cretaceous, 96.7–66 Ma

Extinct clade of dinosaurs

Hadrosauromorpha is a clade of iguanodontian ornithopods, defined in 2014 by David B. Norman to divide Hadrosauroidea into the basal taxa with compressed manual bones and a pollex, and the derived taxa that lack them. The clade is formally defined in the PhyloCode as "the largest clade containing Hadrosaurus foulkii, but not Probactrosaurus gobiensis". This results in different taxon inclusion depending on the analysis.

== Classification ==
Hadrosauromorpha was first used in literature by David B. Norman in 2014 in a discussion of phylogenetics of Hypselospinus. In his 2014 paper Norman references another of his publications as the authority for Hadrosauromorpha, a chapter in the book Hadrosaurs. However, the book was in fact published later, in 2015. Following Article 19.4 of the PhyloCode, the authorship of the clade is thus Norman (2015), while the authorship of the definition is Norman (2014).

=== Definition ===
Hadrosauromorpha was first given a phylogenetic definition by Norman (2014 and 2015) as hadrosauroid taxa closer to Edmontosaurus regalis than Probactrosaurus gobiensis. This definition was contested by Mickey Mortimer, who stated that to follow the PhyloCode the taxon Hadrosaurus must be included in the definition, as it is the type genus of Hadrosauromorpha. By this definition, Norman (2015) considered Hadrosauromorpha to include Hadrosauridae, as well as the taxa Tethyshadros and Bactrosaurus. Norman in 2014 had included more taxa in Hadrosauromorpha, those of Norman (2015) as well as Levnesovia, Gilmoreosaurus and Telmatosaurus, the last of which was considered inside Hadrosauridae by Norman in 2015. Another phylogenetic analysis by Xing et al. in 2014 also found that Eolambia and Protohadros, both found outside Hadrosauromorpha by Norman, fell within his definition, as well as a large number of other taxa.

=== Phylogeny ===
Many different versions of phylogenies have been conducted on the group of hadrosauromorphs. Norman (2014) created his own analysis, which includes 105 different morphological characters and 27 select ornithopod taxa. His phylogeny is shown below, using his specific clade definitions:

- Hadrosauriformes (Altirhinus + Edmontosaurus)
  - Altirhinus
  - - Eolambia
    - - Equijubus
      - - Probactrosaurus
        - Hadrosauromorpha
          - Tethyshadros
          - - Levnesovia
            - - Bactrosaurus
              - - Gilmoreosaurus
                - - Telmatosaurus
                  - Euhadrosauria

Norman's definitions have been heavily criticized by Mickey Mortimer as being unnecessary changes which cause more confusion to classification. Other phylogenetic analyses, like the results of Madzia et al. in 2020, have placed Hadrosauromorpha in the middle of a long grade of stem-hadrosaurs, without any large groups of taxa unlike previous versions of the same analysis, apart from a large group of Eurasian taxa.

- Hadrosauroidea
  - - Morelladon
    - Mantellisaurus
  - - Equijubus
    - - - Bolong
        - Ouranosaurus
      - - Jinzhousaurus
        - - - Xuwulong
            - - Altirhinus
              - - Koshisaurus
                - - Gongpoquansaurus
                  - - Batyrosaurus
                    - - Proa
                      - Ratchasimasaurus
          - - Penelopognathus
            - - Sirindhorna
              - Zuoyunlong
              - Probactrosaurus
              - Hadrosauromorpha
                - - Eolambia
                  - Jintasaurus
                - - Jeyawati
                  - - Protohadros
                    - - Datonglong
                      - Tethyshadros
                      - Levnesovia
                      - Nanyangosaurus
                      - - Bactrosaurus
                        - Gilmoreosaurus
                        - Orthomerus
                        - - - Tanius
                            - Zhanghenglong
                          - - - Plesiohadros
                              - Shuangmiaosaurus
                            - Hadrosauridae

== Description ==
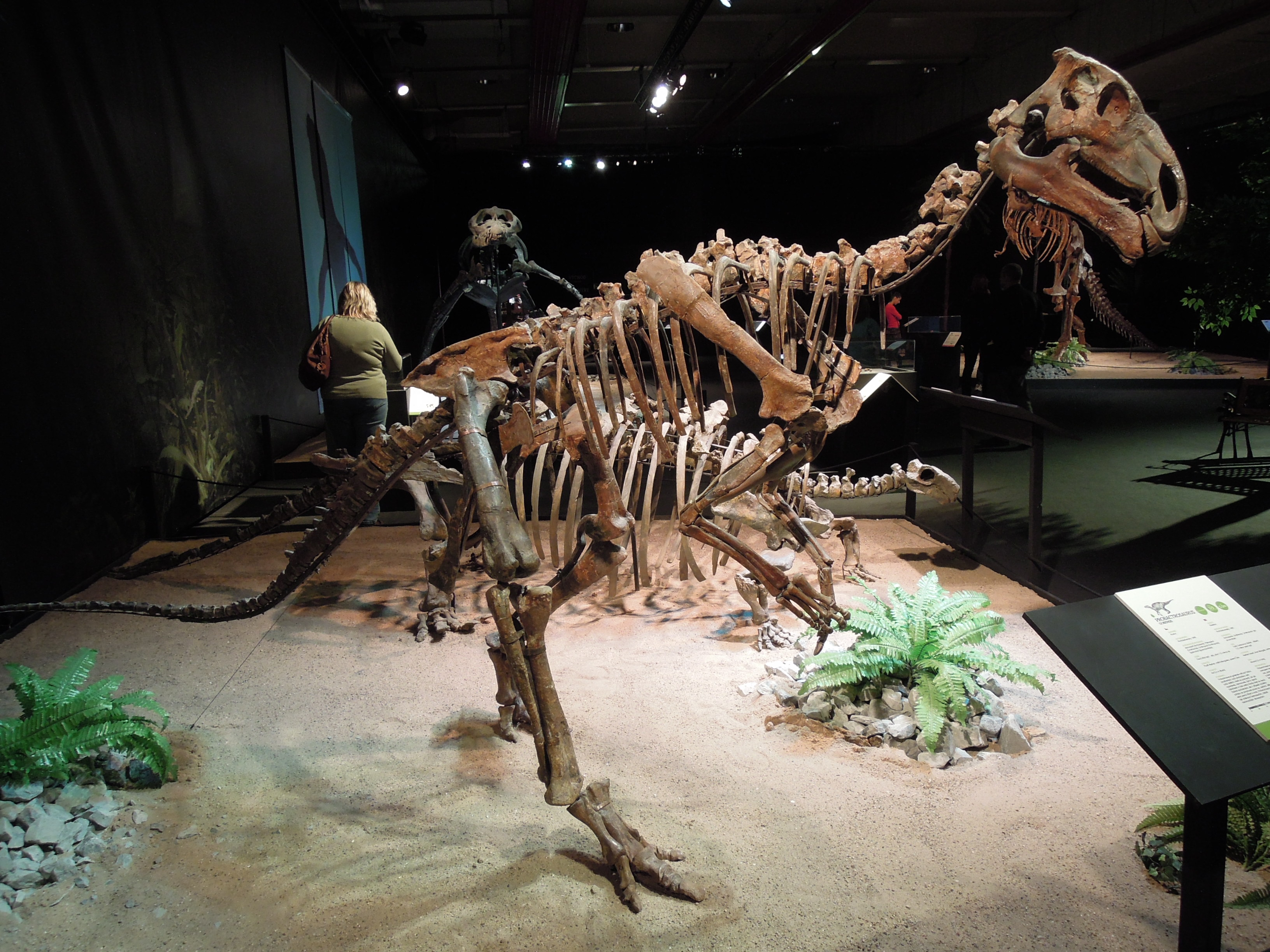
Skeleton of Probactrosaurus, the taxon just outside Hadrosauromorpha

Probactrosaurus was selected as the outgroup to Hadrosauromorpha because of numerous differences that Norman (2014) thought to be significant. The tooth crowns in the dentary are asymmetrical and have multiple vertical ridges; there is a foramen in the surangular; and the quadrate bone has a more prominent depression for the articulation of the jugal. None of these features are found in the skulls of the more derived hadrosauromorphans. The premaxilla contacts the prefrontal, and the jugal contact with the ectopterygoid bone of the palate is reduced.

In the appendicular regions, hadrosauromorphans the scapulae are not J-shaped, instead having an overhanging projection. The lower forelimb bones are more slender in both hadrosauromorphans and Probactosaurus, unlike their more robust ancestors. Probactosaurus, however, possesses the basal condition of having a small, conical pollex, like in earlier ornithopods such as Iguanodon or Hypselospinus. This absence of a pollex is also linked to a reduction of the carpal bones, and a less mobile manus. The ilium bones of Probactrosaurus are more angular than in hadrosauromorphs, which lack a brevis shelf. It was also identified that the femoral shaft is straight in hadrosauromorphans and the pedal bones are truncated
