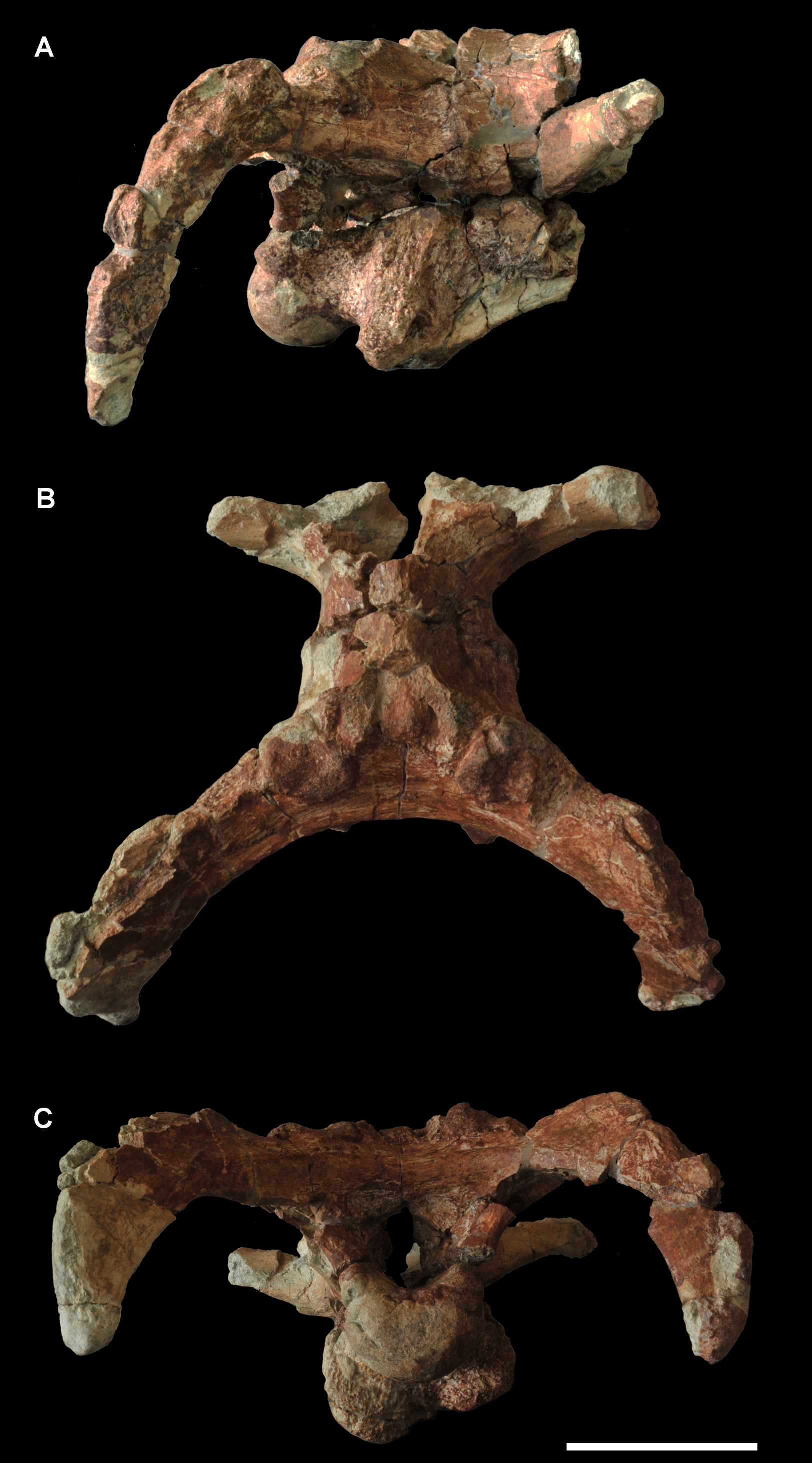
- Skull elements

Scientific classification
- Kingdom: Animalia
- Phylum: Chordata
- Class: Reptilia
- Clade: Dinosauria
- Clade: †Ornithischia
- Clade: †Ornithopoda
- Clade: †Hadrosauromorpha
- Genus: †Yunganglong; Wang et al., 2013

Type species
- †Yunganglong datongensis Wang et al., 2013

= Yunganglong =

Yunganglong Temporal range: early Late Cretaceous, Cenomanian

Genus of dinosaurs

Yunganglong is an extinct genus of basal hadrosauroid dinosaur known from the early Late Cretaceous lower Zhumapu Formation of Zuoyun County, Shanxi Province of northeastern China. It contains a single species, Yunganglong datongensis.

== Discovery and naming ==
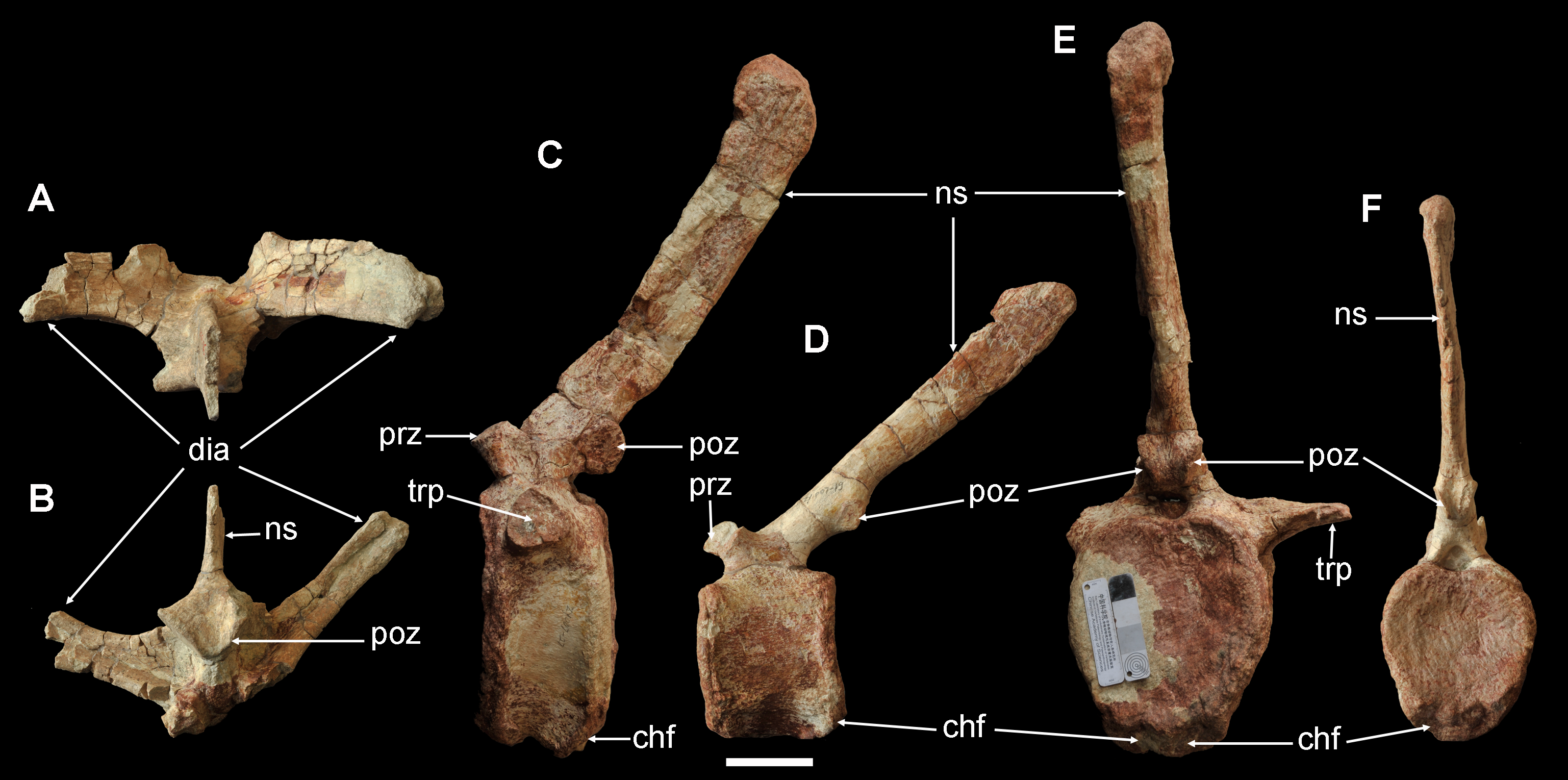
Partial dorsal and two caudal vertebrae

Yunganglong was first described and named by Run-Fu Wang, Hai-Lu You, Shi-Chao Xu, Suo-Zhu Wang, Jian Yi, Li-Juan Xie, Lei Jia and Ya-Xian Li in 2013 and the type species is Y. datongensis. The generic name honors Yungang Grottoes, a UNESCO World Heritage site built in the 5th and 6th centuries about 50 km east of the fossil locality, and derived from long meaning "dragon" in Chinese. The specific name refers to the city of Datong, located in northern Shanxi province, where the holotype was found.

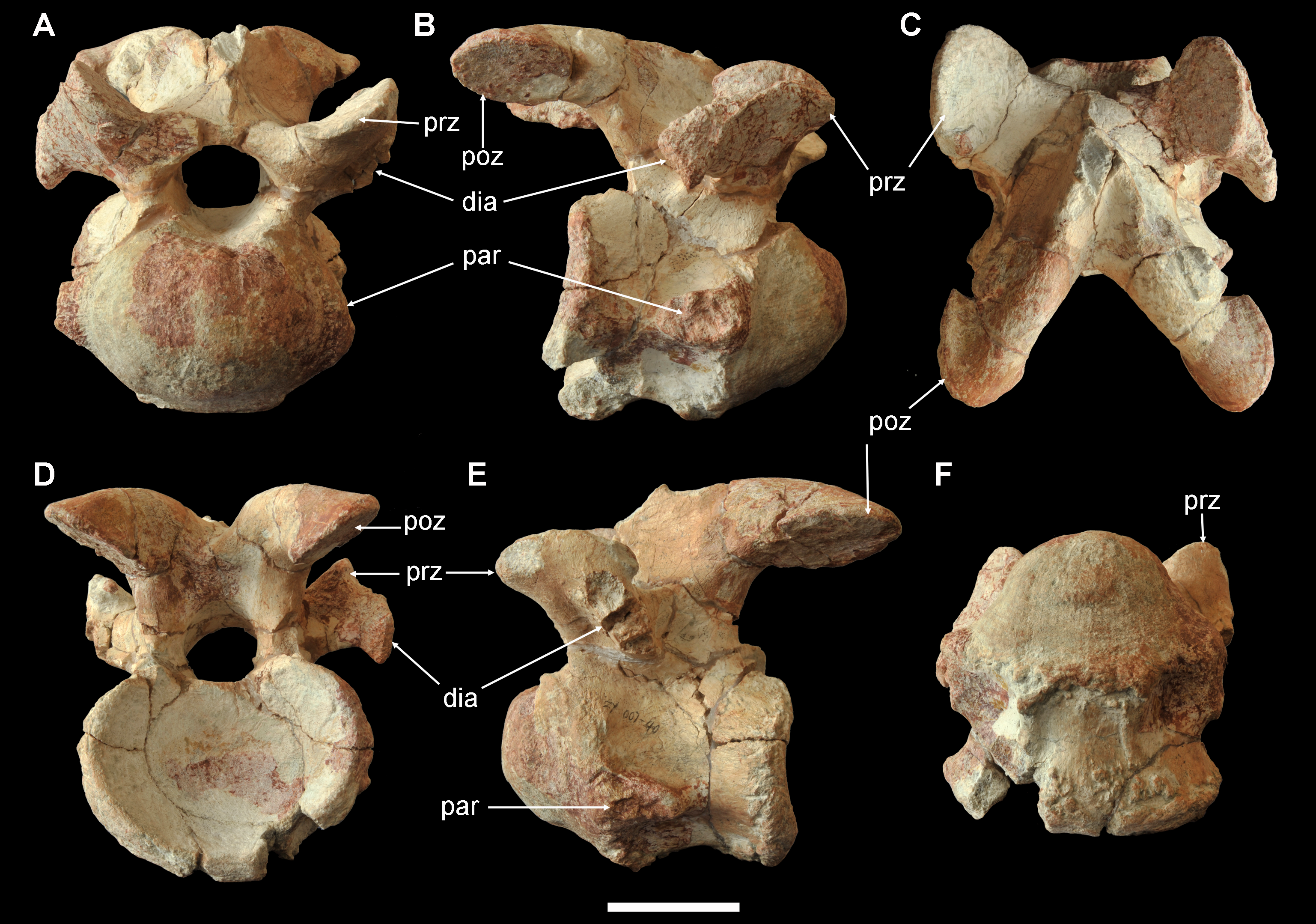
Cervical vertebra

Yunganglong is known solely from the holotype SXMG V 00001, field number ZY007, an associated but disarticulated partial skeleton housed at the Shanxi Museum of Geology. The holotype came from a single individual, and includes the caudodorsal part of the skull, ZY007-37 and ZY007-38, separated along the floor of the braincase; two cervical vertebrae ZY007-40 and ZY007-41; partial dorsal neural arch and neural processes ZY007-36; two caudal vertebrae, including the proximal ZY007-27 and the middle ZY007-19; distal portions of both ischia (left ZY007-11 and right ZY007-12, distal end of left femur ZY007-32, proximal portion of right tibia ZY007-1, and distal portion of left tibia with astragalus ZY007-2. The remains were collected in 2011 from Locality 7 of the Zhumapu Formation, as a part of a project to find dinosaurs for the Shanxi Museum of Geology, initiated by the Department of Land and Resources of Shanxi Province. SXMG V 00001 was found in the vicinity of Zuoyun County, from the lower part of Zhumapu Formation, dating to the early Late Cretaceous based on biostratigraphic correlations, overlying the late Early Cretaceous Zuoyun Formation. Other than SXMG V 00001, ankylosaur and ceratopsian remains were found from the newly discovered localities. The first dinosaur record in Shanxi Province was reported by Young (1958), from two localities in Zuoyun County. He assigned hadrosauroid material recovered from the Xinyaogou locality of the Zuoyun area to Bactrosaurus johnsoni, including two isolated teeth, some vertebrae including a series of 25 caudal vertebrae, one rib, one right humerus and several manual and pedal bones. Although no overlapping material exists, based on the more basal phylogenetic position and lower stratigraphic horizon of Yunganglong compared to Bactrosaurus, Young's material more probably pertains to Yunganglong.

== Description ==
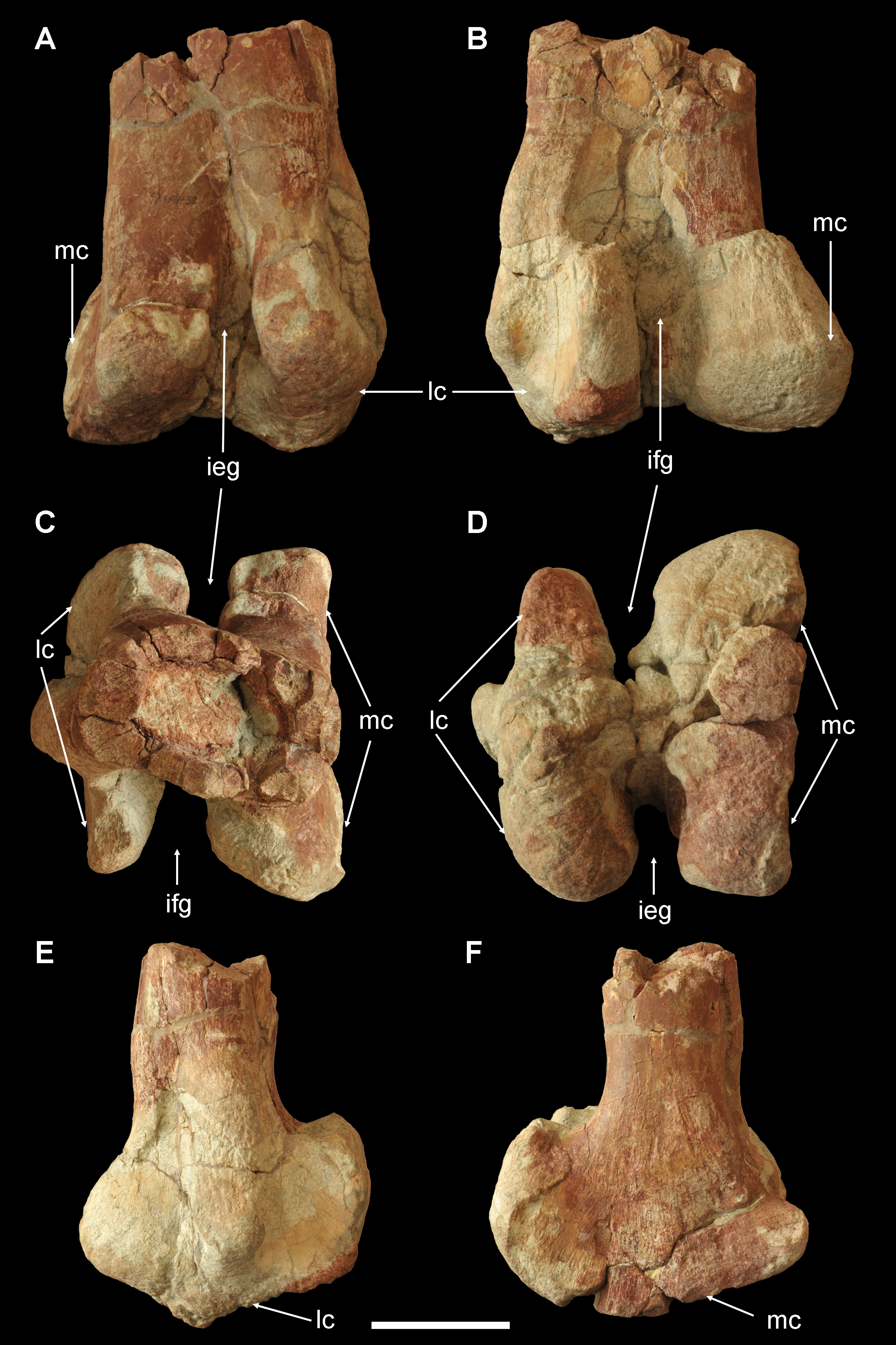
Distal end of left femur

Wang et al. (2013) diagnosed Yunganglong datongensis using a unique combination of four characters. The caudal surface of the supraoccipital in Yunganglong and more advanced hadrosauroids is inclined steeply forward at approximately 45°, while nearly vertical in Jintasaurus and less derived Hadrosauriformes. The horizontal portion of the paroccipital process is caudolaterally extended and accompanied by the squamosal, but laterally extended in Jintasaurus and less derived Hadrosauriformes. As observed in Yunganglong and Jintasaurus, but not in Bactrosaurus and more advanced taxa, the pendent portion of the paroccipital process does not curve cranially. Finally, Yunganglong and less derived Hadrosauriformes possess a deep, U-shaped, intercondylar extensor groove on the femur, partially enclosed by expansion of medial and lateral condyles, while in more advanced taxa (e.g. Nanyangosaurus) it is fully enclosed.

Yunganglong cannot be directly compared with three other non-hadrosaurid hadrosauroids. These include Shuangmiaosaurus from the early Late Cretaceous of Liaoning Province of northeastern China, and two other early Late Cretaceous taxa from North America: the Cenomanian Protohadros and the Turonian Jeyawati. Like other hadrosauroids, Yunganglong was a ground-dwelling herbivore that could walk bipedally, and could stand on all four legs. The skull of Yunganglong is relatively wide and low.

== Phylogeny ==
Based on its morphology Wang et al. (2013) showed that Yunganglong was more derived than the basal hadrosauriform Iguanodon but more primitive than the hadrosaurids, such as the well known Edmontosaurus and Corythosaurus. To further explore the phylogenetic position of Y. datongensis among hadrosauriforms, Wang et al. (2013) used a modified version of the data matrix first presented by Sues and Averianov (2009). Nanyangosaurus, Shuangmiaosaurus, and Yunganglong were added to the matrix, and two character codings were modified. In the strict consensus tree, Yunganglong was recovered as more advanced than Probactrosaurus, in an unresolved polytomy with Jintasaurus, Protohadros, Nanyangosaurus, Shuangmiaosaurus, Levnesovia, Bactrosaurus, Tanius, Telmatosaurus and the clade formed by Aralosaurus and Hadrosauridae. The 50% majority rule tree resolved its phylogenetic position further, as shown in the cladogram below.

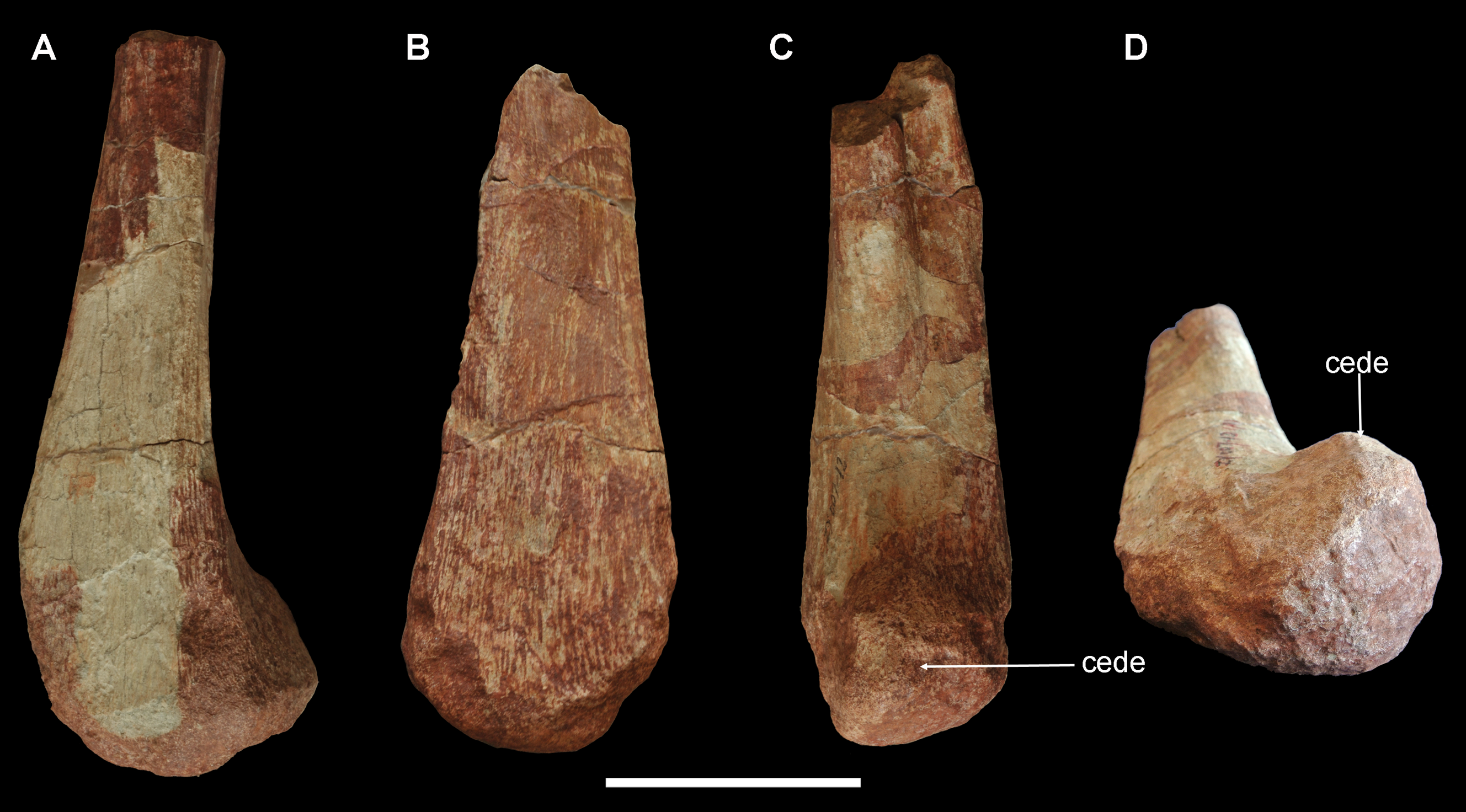
Portions of ischia

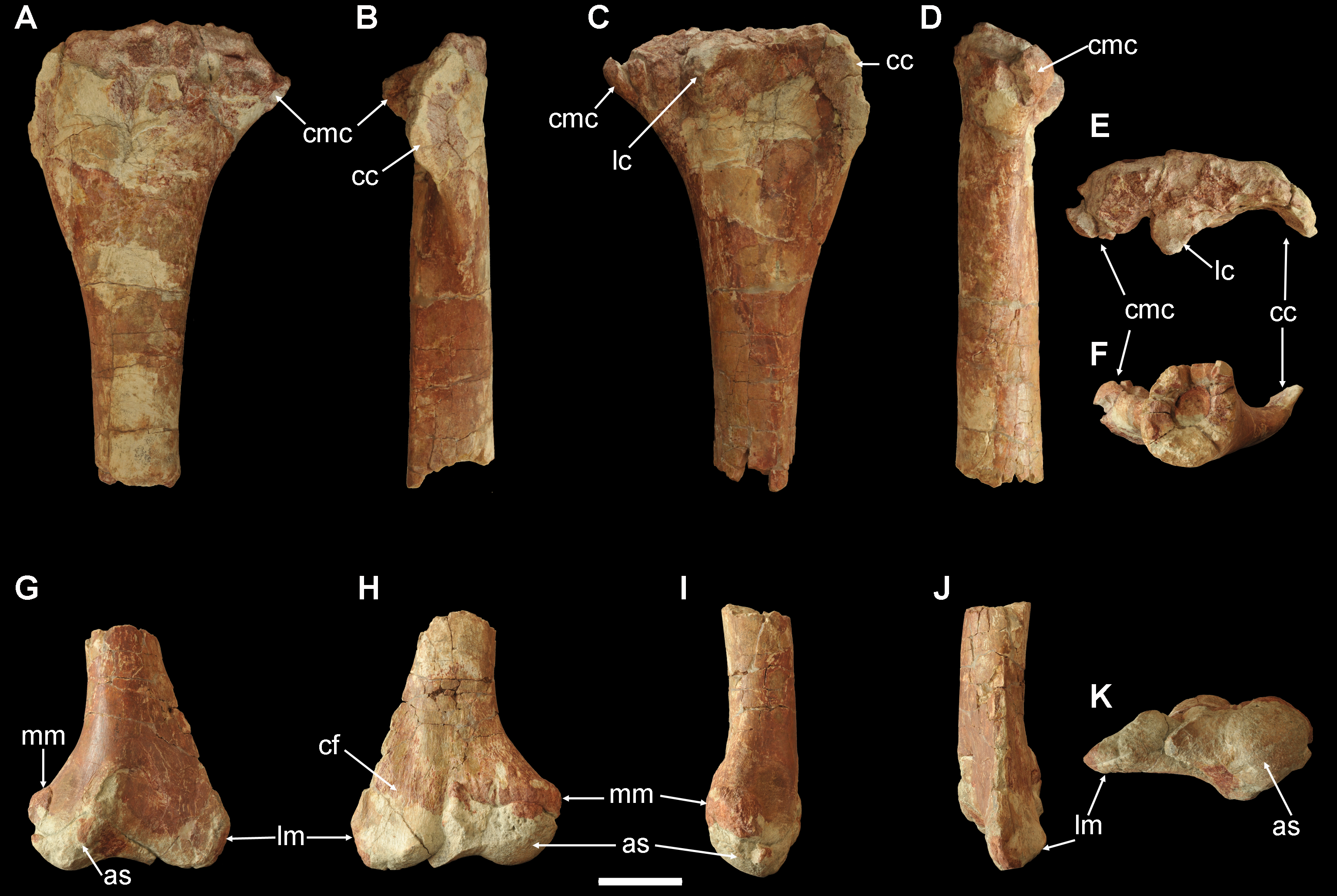
Tibia and astragalus

- Hadrosauriformes
  - Altirhinus kurzanovi
  - Iguanodon bernissartensis
  - Ouranosaurus nigeriensis
  - Hadrosauroidea
    - Equijubus normani
    - - Eolambia caroljonesa
      - Fukuisaurus tetoriensis
    - - Probactrosaurus gobiensis
      - - Jintasaurus meniscus
        - Nanyangosaurus zhugeii
        - Protohadros byrdi
        - Shuangmiaosaurus gilmorei
        - Yunganglong datongensis
        - - Tanius sinensis
          - - Bactrosaurus johnsoni
            - Levnesovia transoxiana
          - - Telmatosaurus transsylvanicus
            - - Aralosaurus tuberiferus
              - Hadrosauridae
