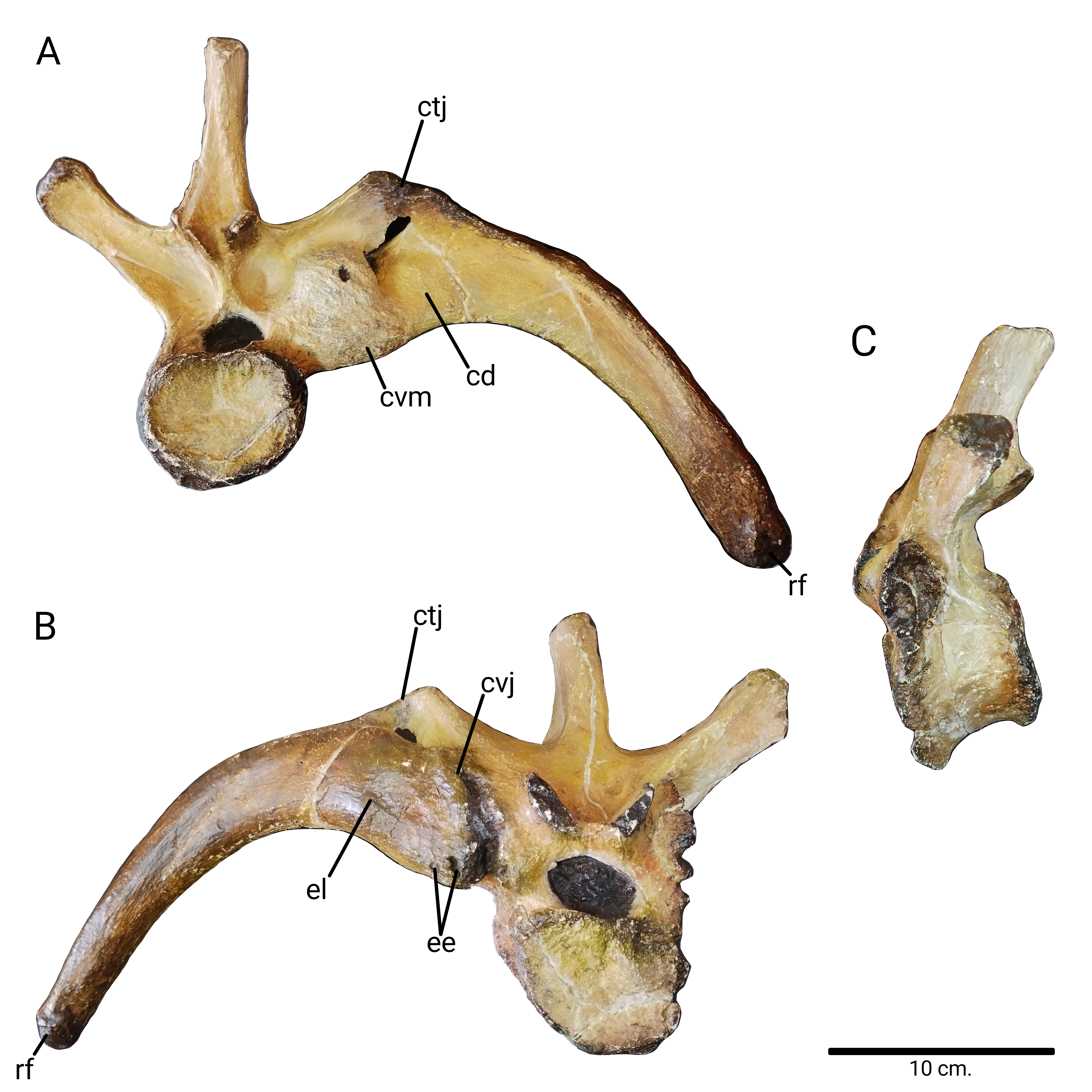
- Vertebra and a dorsal rib of H. tiquichensis (IGM 6253) with pathological conditions

Scientific classification
- Kingdom: Animalia
- Phylum: Chordata
- Class: Reptilia
- Clade: Dinosauria
- Clade: †Ornithischia
- Clade: †Ornithopoda
- Clade: †Hadrosauromorpha
- Genus: †Huehuecanauhtlus; Ramírez-Velasco et al., 2012

Type species
- †Huehuecanauhtlus tiquichensis Ramírez-Velasco et al. 2012

= Huehuecanauhtlus =

Huehuecanauhtlus Temporal range: Santonian, ~85.8–83.5 Ma

Extinct genus of dinosaurs

Huehuecanauhtlus is a genus of hadrosauroid dinosaur known from the Late Cretaceous (Santonian stage) of Michoacán, western Mexico. It contains a single species, Huehuecanauhtlus tiquichensis.

== Discovery ==
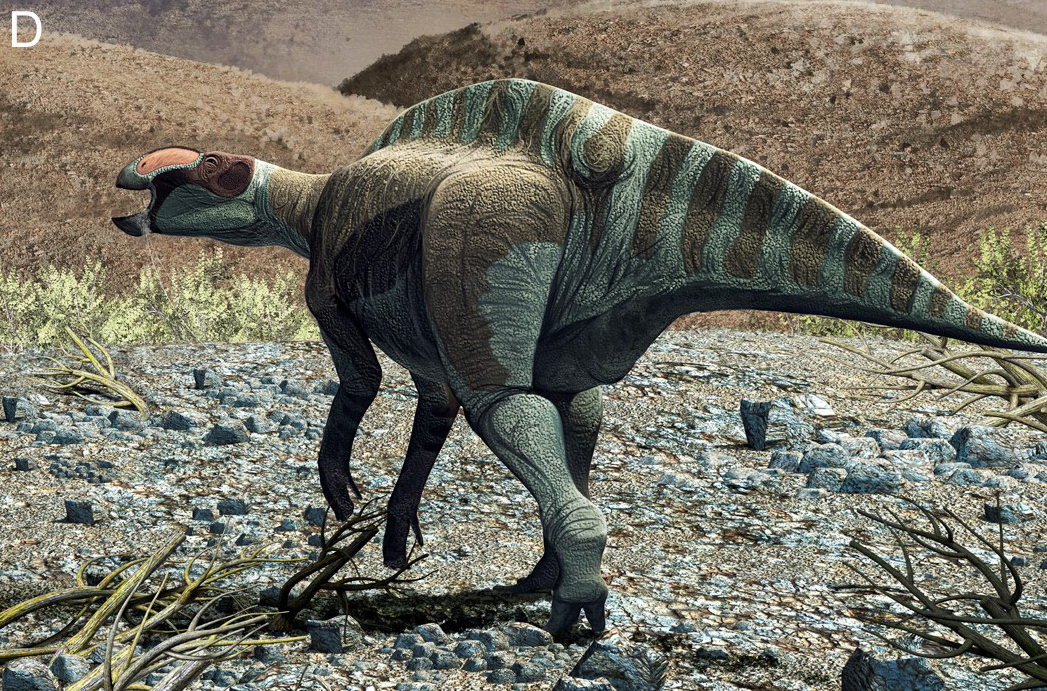
Restoration of H. tiquichensis in its environment

Huehuecanauhtlus is known only from two individuals. The holotype IGM 6253 represented by fragmentary skull (partial left maxilla and dentary fragment) and postcranial skeleton including four cervical vertebrae, nine dorsal vertebrae, four dorsal neural spines, one dorsal diapophysis, five right dorsal ribs, seven left dorsal ribs, seven sacral neural spines, seven sacral diapophyses, one caudal diapophysis, three caudal vertebrae, two caudal neural spine, eight fragmentary ossified tendons, left and right partial ilium, and left and right partial pubis. The smaller paratype, IGM 6254, is represented by fragment of left dentary, two teeth, and one cervical prezygapophysis.

Both specimens were collected at the Barranca Los Bonetes locality in Tuzantla, Michoacán. The holotype came from the sixth fossiliferous spot, whereas the paratype came from the third spot, of an unnamed formation, dating to the Santonian stage of the Late Cretaceous period, about 85.8–83.5 million years ago.

Huehuecanauhtlus was first described and named by Angel Alejandro Ramírez-Velasco, Mouloud Benammi, Albert Prieto-Márquez, Jesús Alvarado Ortega and René Hernández-Rivera in 2012 and the type species is Huehuecanauhtlus tiquichensis. The generic name is derived from Náhuatl (group of dialects related to the Aztecan languages) huehuetl, meaning "ancient" and canauhtli, meaning "duck" in reference to its hadrosauroid affinities. The specific name, tiquichensis, honors the town of Tiquicheo, for the generosity and hospitality of its people during the fieldwork season.

== Description ==
Huehuecanauhtlus was a medium-sized hadrosaur, measuring 6 metres (20 ft) long and weighing around 1–1.4 metric tons (1.1–1.5 short tons). Ramírez-Velasco et al. (2012) diagnosed Huehuecanauhtlus by a unique combination of characters. For example, two teeth exposed on the occlusal plane of the rostral third and the posterior third of the dentary and maxilla, respectively. It had seven sacral vertebrae and tall neural spines of posterior vertebrae, being between 3.5 and 4 times taller than their corresponding centra. As in Claosaurus, its supraacetabular process is as long as 75% of the length of the central iliac plate, with an apex located above the posteroventral corner of the ischiac tuberosity. It differs from other hadrosauroids in possessing an extremely deflected preacetabular process of the ilium, so that the bisecting long axis of the process forms an angle less than 130° with the horizontal plane defined by the ischiac and pubic peduncles. It can be differentiated from basal hadrosauroids in having a very deep concave profile of the dorsomedial margin of the iliac plate, adjacent to the supraacetabular process.

== Classification ==
A phylogenetic analysis performed by Ramírez-Velasco et al. (2012) found a big polytomy of all hadrosauroids which are more derived than Probactrosaurus but less derived than Hadrosauridae. The exclusion of Claosaurus, Jeyawati, Levnesovia, Nanyangosaurus, Shuangmiaosaurus and Telmatosaurus from the polytomy resulted in a more resolved topology. The cladogram below shows Huehuecanauhtlus phylogenetic position among other hadrosauroids following this topology (the relationships within Hadrosauridae are not shown).

- Hadrosauroidea
  - Jinzhousaurus yangi
  - - Fukuisaurus tetoriensis
    - - Penelopognathus weishampeli
      - - Equijubus normani
        - - Probactrosaurus gobiensis
          - - - Eolambia caroljonesa
              - Protohadros byrdi
            - - Tanius sinensis
              - - - Bactrosaurus johnsoni
                  - Glishades ericksoni
                - - Gilmoreosaurus mongoliensis
                  - - Huehuecanauhtlus tiquichensis
                    - - - Jintasaurus meniscus
                        - Tethyshadros insularis
                      - Hadrosauridae

== See also ==
- Timeline of hadrosaur research
