= Zhumapu Formation =

Late Cretaceous geologic formation in China

- Stratigraphic range: Cenomanian; ~99–93 Ma
- Type: Geological formation
- Overlies: Zuoyun Formation

Location
- Coordinates: 40.0°N 112.7°E
- Approximate paleocoordinates: 42.4°N 104.1°E
- Region: Shanxi Province
- Country: China
- Zhumapu Formation (China) Zhumapu Formation (Shanxi)

The Zhumapu Formation is an early Late Cretaceous (estimated Cenomanian) geologic formation in Shanxi Province, China. The hadrosauroids Yunganglong and Zuoyunlong and the informally named ankylosaur "Jindipelta" have been recovered from this unit.

== See also ==
- List of dinosaur-bearing rock formations
- Sunjiawan Formation
