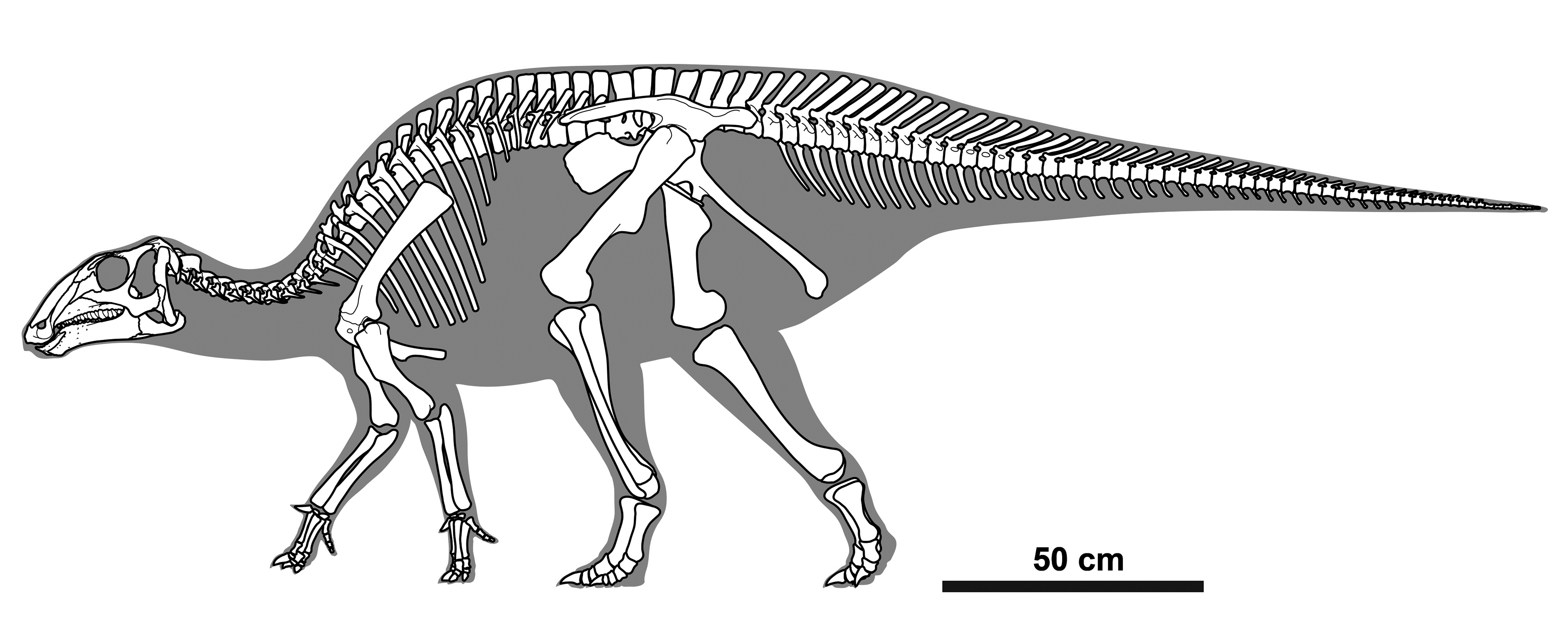
- Skeletal reconstruction

Scientific classification
- Kingdom: Animalia
- Phylum: Chordata
- Class: Reptilia
- Clade: Dinosauria
- Clade: †Ornithischia
- Clade: †Ornithopoda
- Clade: †Hadrosauromorpha
- Genus: †Gobihadros; Tsogtbaatar et al., 2019

Type species
- †Gobihadros mongoliensis Tsogtbaatar et al., 2019

= Gobihadros =

Gobihadros Temporal range: Late Cretaceous, 96–83.6 Ma

Extinct genus of dinosaurs

Gobihadros is a genus of basal hadrosauroid dinosaur that lived during the Late Cretaceous period in what is now the Bayanshiree Formation (dated to the Cenomanian-Santonian) of Mongolia. It contains only the type species Gobihadros mongoliensis, which has an estimated length of 7.5 m (25 ft).

== Discovery and naming ==
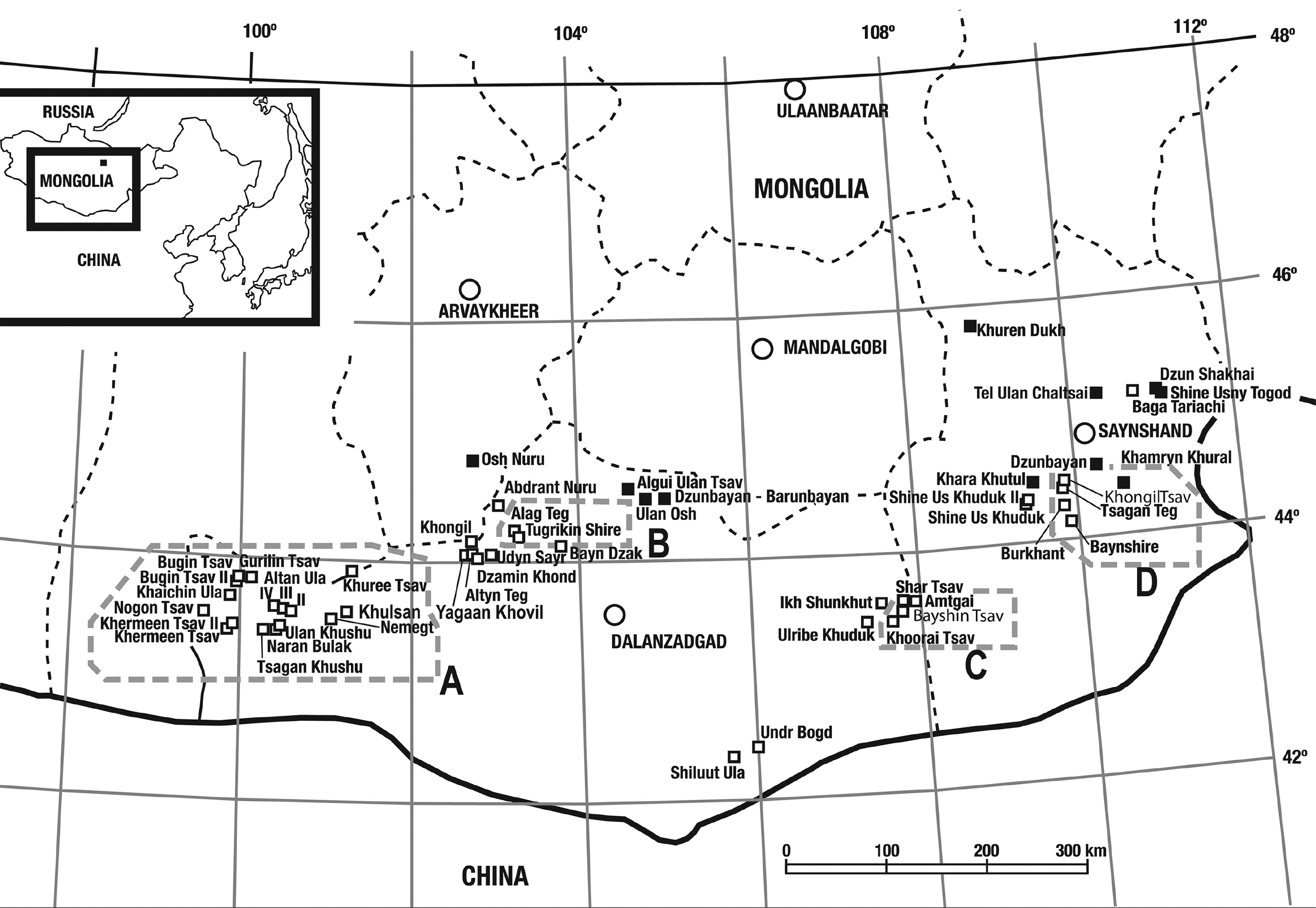
Fossil localities in Mongolia. Gobihadros is mainly known from C and D areas

Between 1993 and 2004, the Mongolian Palaeontological Center and the Japanese Hayashibara Museum of Natural Sciences excavated sites at Bayshin Tsav. Material was discovered of a basal hadrosauroid new to science. Tsogtbaatar treated this species in his dissertation of 2008.

In 2019, the type species Gobihadros mongoliensis was named and described by Khishigjav Tsogtbaatar, David Bruce Weishampel, David Christopher Evans, and Mahito Watabe. The generic name combines references to the Gobi Desert and the Hadrosauroidea. The specific name refers to the provenance from Mongolia. Because the describing article appeared in an electronic publication, Life Science Identifiers were needed to make the name valid. These were 38EE8AD7-AD50-44BF-B31D-B2675456556A for the genus and 2DB42EE7-6A64-4D64-AA19-E5D3453BF99C for the species.

The holotype, MPC-D100/746, was found in a layer of the Bayan Shireh Formation dating from the Cenomanian-Santonian stages. It consists of a nearly complete skeleton with a skull. While the postcranial skeleton was articulated, the skull was partly disintegrated. Numerous specimens have been referred to the species, the most important among them specimen MPC-D100/763, a complete articulated skull, with a hand. The specimens have partly been found in other sites in Mongolia. Combined, they make Gobihadros the most completely known basal hadrosauroid from Asia.

== Description ==
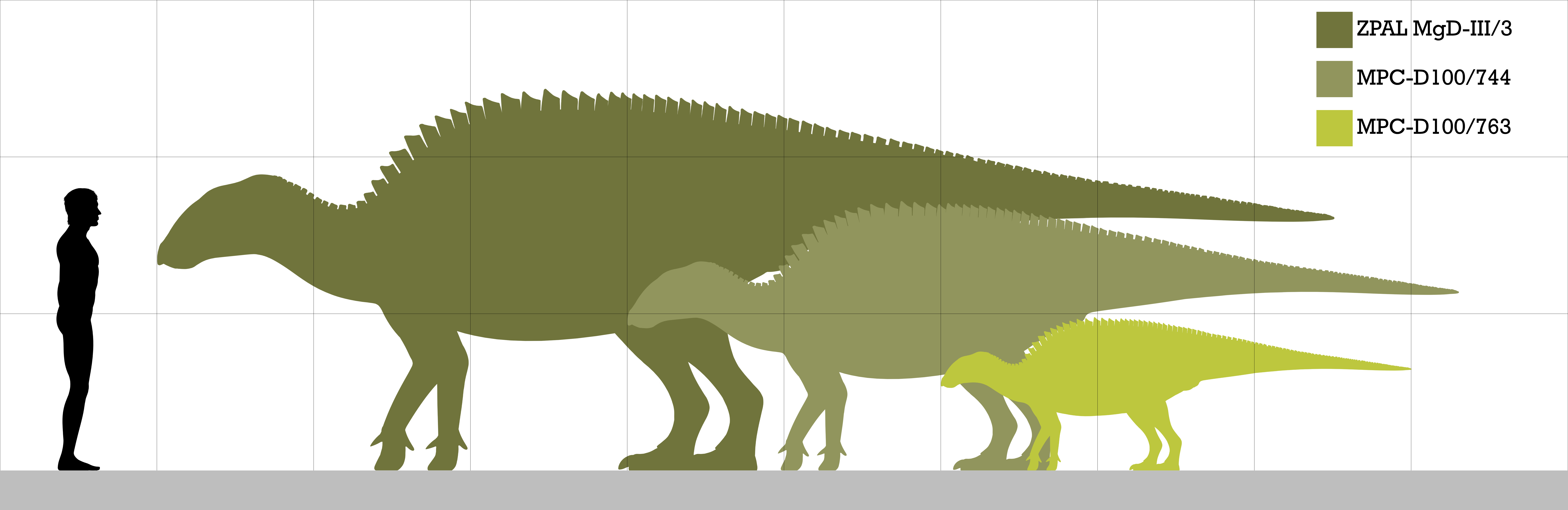
Size comparison of three specimens representing growth stages

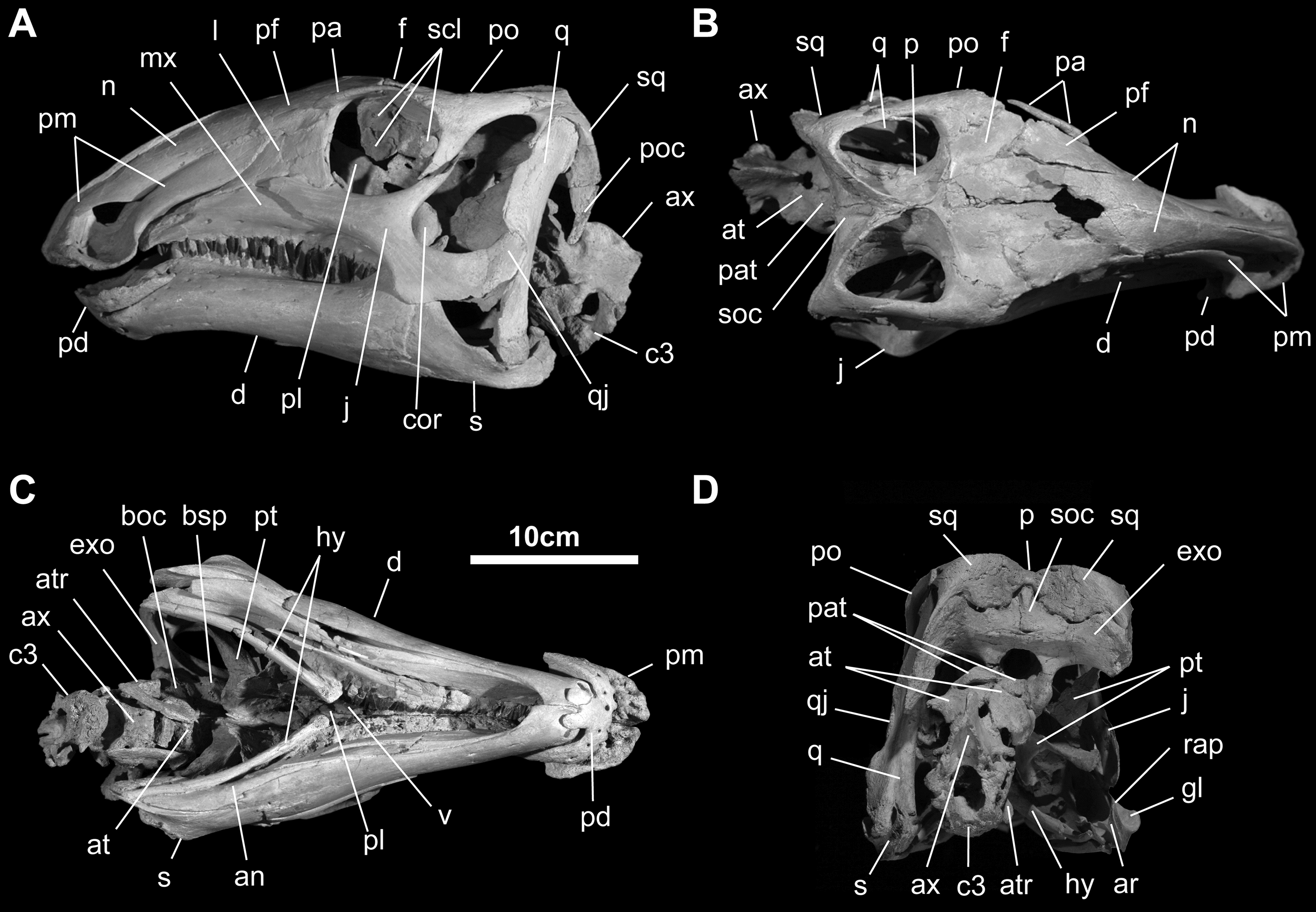
Skull of specimen MPC-D100/763

Gobihadros was a medium sized hadrosauroid. The specimen MPC-D100/763, was approximately 3 m (9.8 ft) at the time of its death, it was however, an immature individual. Other specimens reached larger sizes; MPC-D100/744 has a 72.8 cm (728 mm) long femur, indicating a length of 5.3 m (17 ft). Nevertheless, specimen ZPAL MgD-III/3 reached 7.5 m (25 ft) long, as indicated by its femur measuring 104 cm (1,040 mm). This size appears to be the top length in fully grown individuals, as indicated by the advanced age of ZPAL MgD-III/3, which features areas of bone resorption and bone remodeling on the femur and tibia.

The describing authors indicated some distinguishing traits. Gobihadros differs from all known other non-hadrosaurid hadrosauroids in possessing a double-layered tomial edge of the premaxilla and the presence of as much as three teeth per tooth position in the lower jaw. These are typical hadrosaurid traits and were concluded to have been acquired separately by the Hadrosauridae in a process of parallel evolution. Gobihadros differs from Bactrosaurus johnsoni, Probactrosaurus gobiensis, Eolambia caroljonesa, Claosaurus agilis and Tethyshadros insularis by an undulating upper profile of the ilium and a more sidewards projecting supra-acetabular crest. Gobihadros differs from T. insularis, Plesiohadros djadokhtaensis and the Hadrosauridae in possessing a conical spike-like claw of the first finger.

== Classification ==
Gobihadros was placed in the Hadrosauroidea in 2019, in a basal position outside of the Hadrosauridae. Its exact affinities were unclear as it was recovered in a polytomy with many other such forms. Its existence was seen as affirming a pattern of subsequent American hadrosauroid invasions into Asia.

== Paleobiology ==
=== Paleopathology ===
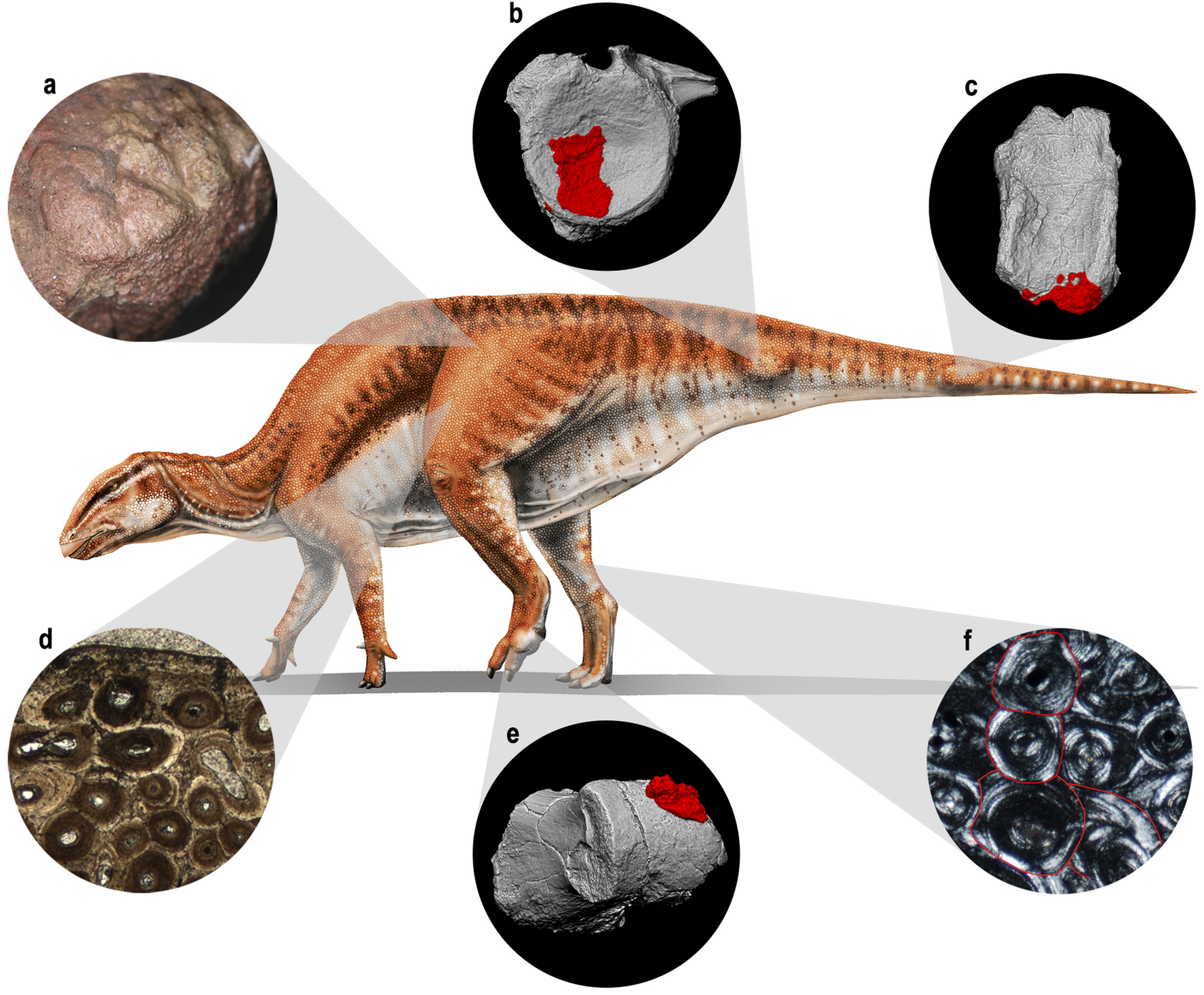
Life restoration of ZPAL MgD-III/3, showcasing features of its advanced age, including paleopathologies

In 2021 Justyna Słowiak and her team examined an exceptionally large individual of Gobihadros (ZPAL MgD-III/3) through CT scans, which was found to preserve traces of abnormal calcium deposits in some bones. These paleopathologies were interpreted to represent traces of calcium pyrophosphate deposition disease, and were found in caudal vertebrae and pedal phalanges. The presence of this disease in this individual combined with its large size—which may represent the top size limit of Gobihadros—indicates that it was a rather old animal and this disease would have been responsible for causing restriction and pain in the joint areas of affected bones. It is likely that the disease developed in the dinosaur due to old age rather than external factors, such as physical trauma. The team also reinforced its advanced age based on the presence of closely spaced lines of arrested growth (LAGS) and external fundamental system in the femur.
