= Glishades =

Glishades Temporal range: Late Cretaceous, 74.5–74 Ma

Scientific classification
- Kingdom: Animalia
- Phylum: Chordata
- Class: Reptilia
- Clade: Dinosauria
- Clade: †Ornithischia
- Clade: †Ornithopoda
- Clade: †Hadrosauromorpha
- Genus: †Glishades; Prieto-Márquez, 2010

Type species
- Glishades ericksoni Prieto-Márquez, 2010

Extinct genus of reptiles

Glishades (from the Latin "glis" meaning "mud", and the Greek "Hades", the mythological lord of the underworld; also meaning "unseen"; together meaning "concealed in mud", referring to being found in sedimentary strata while metaphorically referring to the world beneath the surface where fossils form) is a genus of hadrosauroid dinosaur that lived in the Late Cretaceous in North America. It is based on AMNH 27414, two partial premaxillae discovered in the Upper Cretaceous rocks of the upper Two Medicine Formation in Montana, dated to about 74.5 million years ago. Cladistic analysis conducted by Prieto-Márquez suggests that Glishades is a non-hadrosaurid hadrosauroid, probably a sister taxon to Bactrosaurus johnsoni. The type species is Glishades ericksoni. In 2012, Campione et al. suggest the holotype specimen of Glishades might actually be an indeterminate juvenile saurolophine hadrosaurid and consider it to be a nomen dubium.

== History and naming ==
The American Museum of Natural History sent an expedition led by American paleontologist Barnum Brown to the Late Cretaceous of Alberta and Montana in 1915, heading to the South Milk River region of northern Montana in October. One large quarry was opened in a shale where well-preserved but disarticulated bones were collected of small hadrosaurs and ceratopsians, as well as a large Saurolophus. From this quarry, 30 mi (48 km) west of Sweetgrass, Montana and within the Two Medicine Formation, Barnum, Peter Kaisen and A.F. Johnson collected AMNH FARB 27414, a pair of partial premaxillae. AMNH FARB 27414 remained undescribed until 2010 when Spanish paleontologist Albert Prieto-Márquez described it as the holotype of the new taxon Glishades ericksoni. The genus name was derived from the Latin word glis, "mud", and the Ancient Greek word and deity ᾍδης (Hades), which means "unseen" as well as metaphorically relates to the underworld realm of Hades as the "world" beneath the surface where fossils are uncovered, with the intended translation of "concealed in mud". The species name is in honor of American paleontologist Gregory M. Erickson for his work on archosaur paleobiology. Prieto-Márquez believed that Glishades was a non-hadrosaurid hadrosauroid, possibly closely related to Bactrosaurus, a unique identification as it would have lived alongside hadrosaurids in the Campanian of the formation.

The significance of Glishades as the first non-hadrosaurid from the Late Campanian of North America led to it being re-evaluated in 2012 by Canadian paleontologist Nicolás E. Campione and colleagues, who considered it a potential juvenile. From the description of its place of discovery, Campione and colleagues interpreted Glishades as likely coming from exposures in the area of Landslide Butte, which have been dated to 74.5 to 74 million years old, and where the hadrosaurids Prosaurolophus and Hypacrosaurus and their juveniles have both been found. The features believed by Prieto-Márquez to distinguish Glishades, including texturing of the beak margin, curvature, and foramina, were found to be more widespread, and phylogenetic analysis found Glishades to be closest to juveniles of Prosaurolophus, Maiasaura, and Gryposaurus supporting a juvenile identity. Glishades could not be distinguished from juveniles of Maiasaura, which is from a slightly older deposit, but is also very similar to contemporaneous Prosaurolophus and Gryposaurus. The lack of suitable characteristics to support referral to any of the genera led Campione and colleagues to consider Glishades as an undiagnostic juvenile saurolophine, a nomen dubium. As a result, no non-hadrosaurid hadrosauroids would be known from the Campanian to Maastrichtian of North America supporting their replacement by hadrosaurids.
