= Zuoyunlong =

Zuoyunlong Temporal range: Late Cretaceous, Cenomanian

Scientific classification
- Kingdom: Animalia
- Phylum: Chordata
- Class: Reptilia
- Clade: Dinosauria
- Clade: †Ornithischia
- Clade: †Ornithopoda
- Genus: †Zuoyunlong; Wang et al., 2017
- Species: †Z. huangi

Binomial name
- †Zuoyunlong huangi Wang et al., 2017

Extinct genus of dinosaurs

Zuoyunlong (meaning "Zuoyun County dragon") is an extinct genus of herbivorous ornithopod dinosaur belonging to the Hadrosauroidea that lived during the Late Cretaceous in the area of present China.

== Discovery and naming ==
The holotype, SXMG V 00 004, was discovered before 2015 by the team of the Shanxi Regional Geological Survey in a layer of the Zhumapu Formation in the province of Shanxi which dates from the Cenomanian, roughly ninety-five million years old. It consists of two bones from the right-hand half of the pelvis, a partial right ilium with the field number ZY004-001 to which the cover sheet is missing, and the lower end of the shaft of the right ischium, field number ZY004-002. Additional specimens are unassigned.

In 2017 the type species Zuoyunlong huangi was named and described by Wang Runfu, You Hailu, Wang Suozhu, Shichao Xu, Yi Jian, Xie Lijuan, Lei Jia, and Xing Hai. The generic name refers to the prefecture of Zuoyun with the Chinese word long, "dragon". The specific name honors the Chinese paleontologist Huang Weilong.

== Description ==
The descriptors established a unique feature derived, or autapomorphy for this taxon: the back sheet of the ilium has only half the length of the main body. The ilium has a preserved length of 62 centimetres (24 in). The shaft of the buttock ends in a side view in a large "foot" the tip of which points obliquely downwards and forwards. The shaft is much higher than the transverse width.

== Classification ==
A cladistic analysis found that Zuoyunlong had a basal position in the Hadrosauroidea, as sister taxon of Probactrosaurus. Thus, at the time of its description, Zuoyulong was the most basal hadrosauroid known from the Upper Cretaceous. As the oldest known hadrosauroid outside Asia, Eolambia and Protohadros from North America, also date from the Cenomanian, the descriptors considered that is likely that Zuoyunlong was close to the separation between the Asian and North American hadrosauroids.

== See also ==
- Timeline of hadrosaur research
- 2017 in archosaur paleontology
