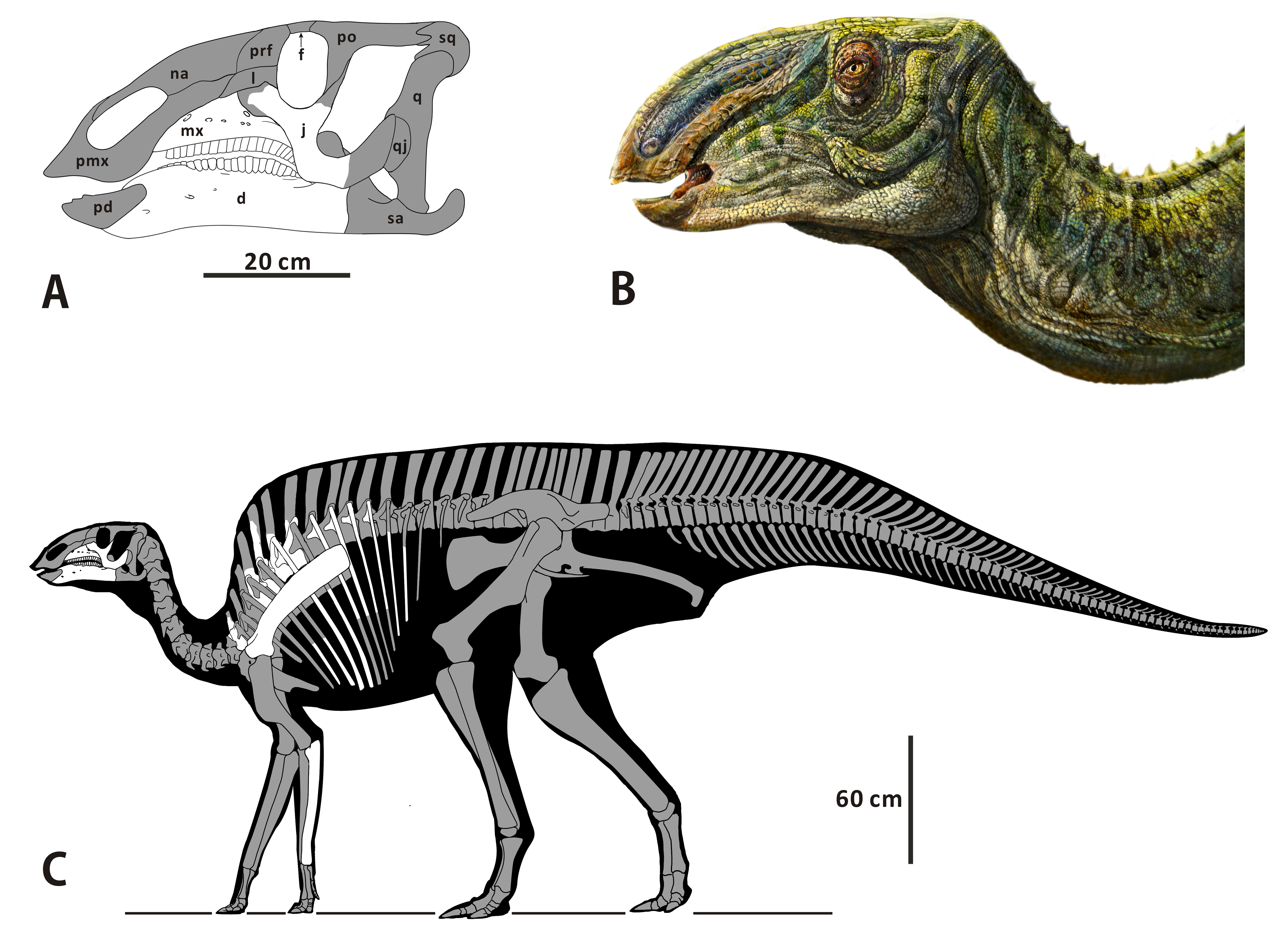
- Restoration

Scientific classification
- Kingdom: Animalia
- Phylum: Chordata
- Class: Reptilia
- Clade: Dinosauria
- Clade: †Ornithischia
- Clade: †Ornithopoda
- Clade: †Hadrosauromorpha
- Genus: †Zhanghenglong; Xing et al., 2014

Type species
- †Zhanghenglong yangchengensis Xing et al., 2014

= Zhanghenglong =

Zhanghenglong Temporal range: Late Cretaceous, 85 Ma

Extinct genus of dinosaurs

Zhanghenglong is an extinct genus of herbivorous hadrosauroid iguanodont dinosaur known from the Late Cretaceous (middle Santonian stage) Majiacun Formation in Xixia County of Henan Province, China. It contains a single species, Zhanghenglong yangchengensis, represented by a disarticulated and partial cranium and postcranial skeleton.

== Discovery and naming ==
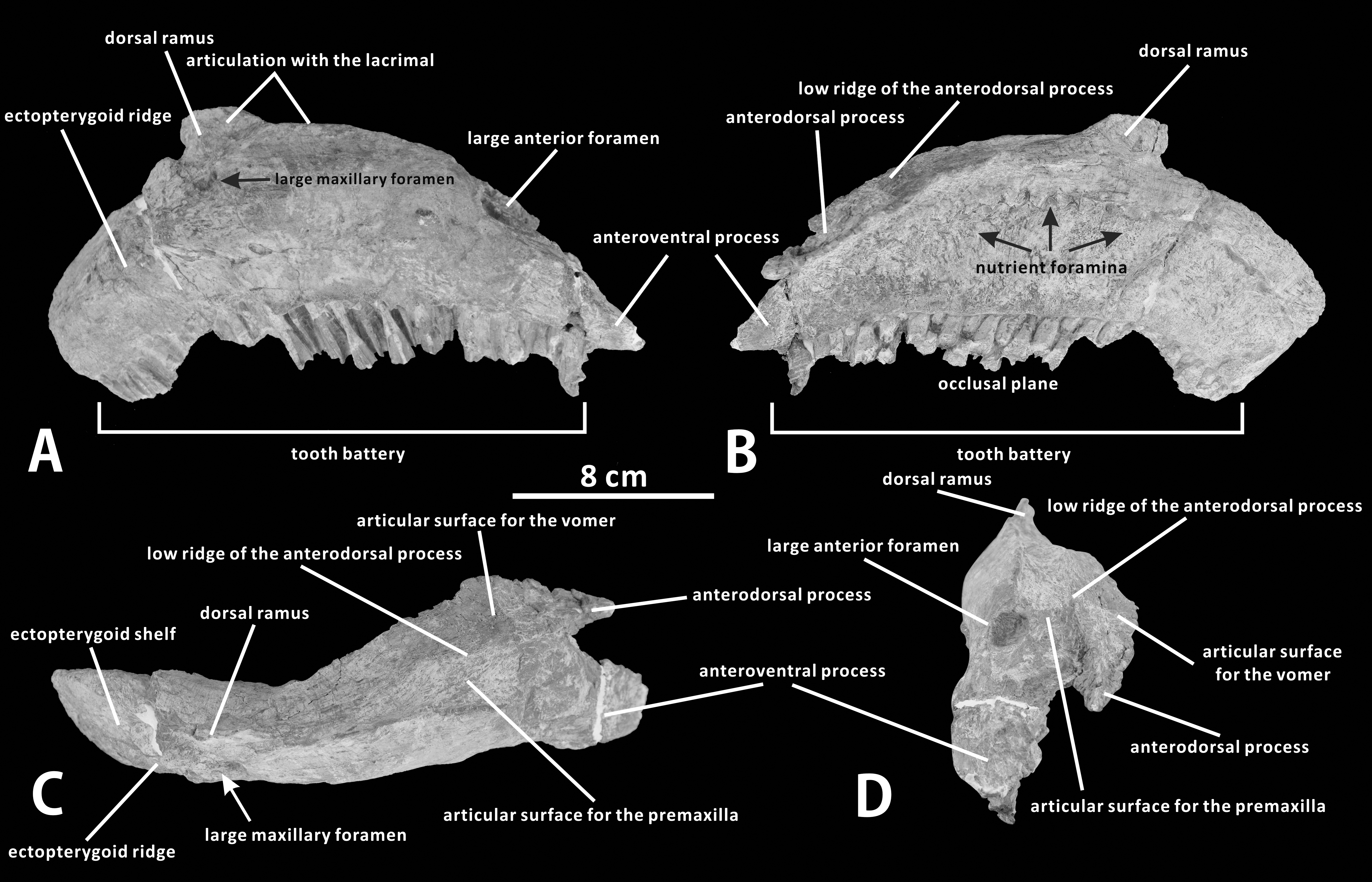
Maxilla of the type specimen

In 2011, at Zhoujiagou in Henan the remains were uncovered of a euornithopod.

In 2014, the type species Zhanghenglong yangchengensis was named and described by Xing Hai, Wang Deyou, Han Fenglu, Corwin Sullivan, Ma Qingyu, He Yiming, David Hone, Yan Ronghao, Du Fuming and Xu Xing. The generic name combines the name of the first century Chinese scientist Zhang Heng with long, Mandarin for "dragon". The specific name refers to Yangcheng, an administrative unit during the Eastern Zhou, partially coinciding with the present Henan.

The holotype, XMDFEC V0013, was found in the Majiacun Formation dating from the middle Santonian, about eighty-five million years old. It consists of a partial skull and lower jaw, including the right maxilla, the right jugal and the right dentary. The paratype is XMDFEC V0014, a partial skeleton lacking the skull, including five back vertebrae, ribs, a shoulder blade and the right ulna.

== Taxonomic status ==
Zhanghenglong is probably a non-hadrosaurid hadrosauroid based on a series of plesiomorphic features present in this taxon. The new genus and species significantly differs from other known members of Hadrosauroidea in having two distinct autapomorphies (strongly deflected posteroventrally posterior third of the maxilla relative to the anterior two thirds of it and dentary teeth with crowns of both median and distally offset primary ridges) and a unique combination of features. Despite the confluence of some plesiomorphic features typical of non-hadrosaurid hadrosauroids, Zhanghenglong possesses some derived characters seen in hadrosaurids, as well as two transitional features that are intermediate between the corresponding plesiomorphic and derived characters of hadrosauroids. This taxon may therefore represent a relatively derived non-hadrosaurid hadrosauroid, and is thought to be one of the closest relatives to Hadrosauridae.

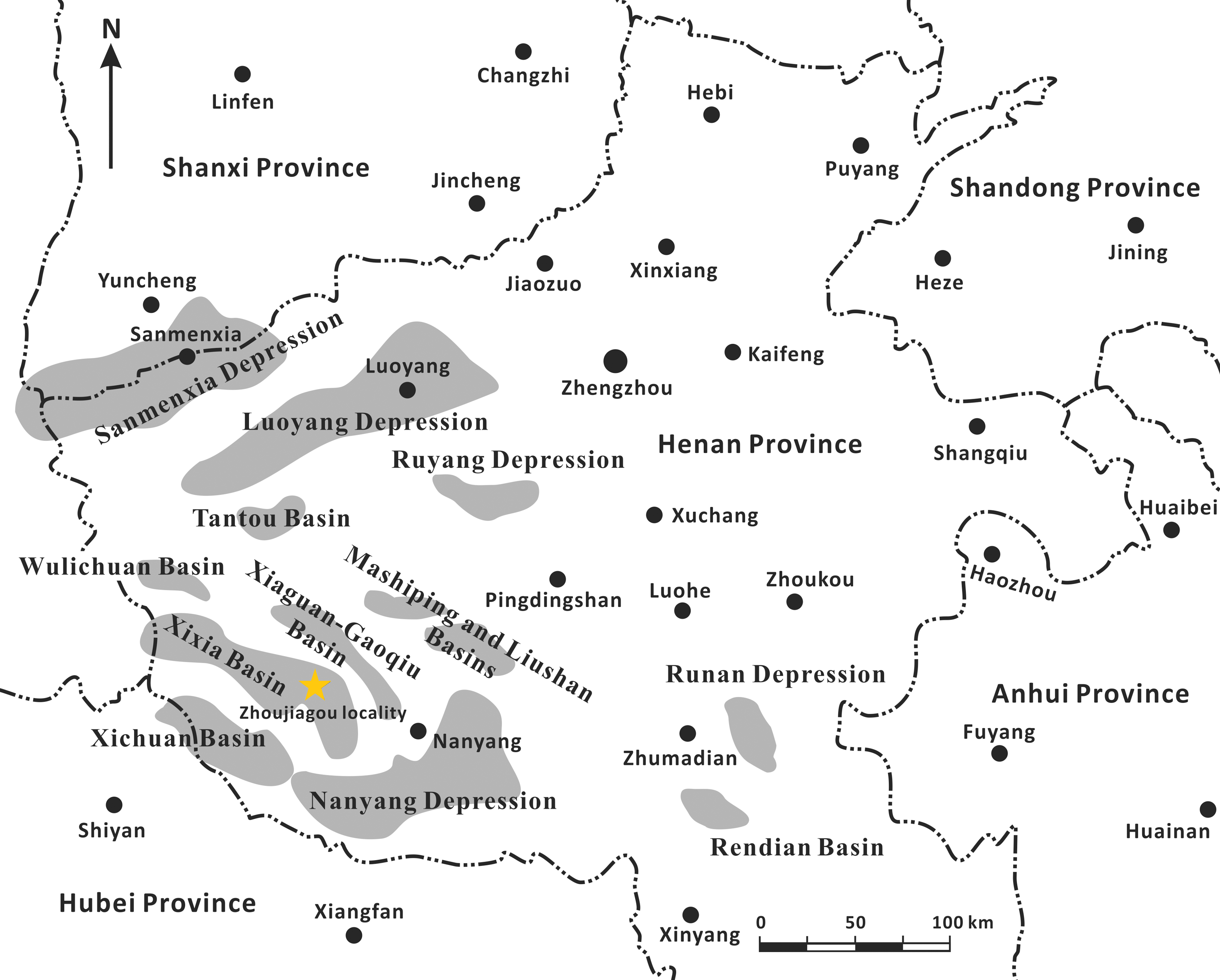
Locality of Z. yangchengensi (orange star) in the Xixia Basin, western Henan, China

- Bactrosaurus
- - Gilmoreosaurus
  - - Shuangmiaosaurus
    - - Nanningosaurus
      - - - Telmatosaurus
          - Tethyshadros
        - - Claosaurus
          - - Zhanghenglong
            - - Nanyangosaurus
              - Hadrosauridae
                - Hadrosaurinae
                - Lambeosaurinae
