= Zuoyun County =

Zuoyun County 左云县 Tsoyun
- County
- Location within Shanxi
- Coordinates: 40°00′47″N 112°42′11″E
- Country: People's Republic of China
- Province: Shanxi
- Prefecture-level city: Datong

Area
  - Total: 1,314 km^{2} (507 sq mi)

Population (2020)
  - Total: 117,943
  - Density: 89.76/km^{2} (232.5/sq mi)
- Time zone: UTC+8 (China Standard)

Zuoyun County is a county in the north of Shanxi province, China, bordering Inner Mongolia to the north. It is the westernmost county-level division of the prefecture-level city of Datong.

== Climate ==
Climate data for Zuoyun, elevation 1,336 m (4,383 ft), (1991–2020 normals, extremes 1981–2010)
| Month | Jan | Feb | Mar | Apr | May | Jun | Jul | Aug | Sep | Oct | Nov | Dec | Year |
|---|---|---|---|---|---|---|---|---|---|---|---|---|---|
| Record high °C (°F) | 10.2 (50.4) | 18.3 (64.9) | 23.7 (74.7) | 32.5 (90.5) | 32.8 (91.0) | 38.1 (100.6) | 38.1 (100.6) | 33.5 (92.3) | 33.3 (91.9) | 26.4 (79.5) | 19.6 (67.3) | 13.6 (56.5) | 38.1 (100.6) |
| Mean daily maximum °C (°F) | −3.9 (25.0) | 0.7 (33.3) | 7.5 (45.5) | 15.6 (60.1) | 21.8 (71.2) | 26.1 (79.0) | 27.5 (81.5) | 25.6 (78.1) | 20.8 (69.4) | 13.7 (56.7) | 5.0 (41.0) | −2.3 (27.9) | 13.2 (55.7) |
| Daily mean °C (°F) | −10.9 (12.4) | −6.7 (19.9) | 0.2 (32.4) | 8.2 (46.8) | 14.8 (58.6) | 19.2 (66.6) | 21.1 (70.0) | 19.2 (66.6) | 13.8 (56.8) | 6.6 (43.9) | −1.7 (28.9) | −8.8 (16.2) | 6.2 (43.3) |
| Mean daily minimum °C (°F) | −16.1 (3.0) | −12.5 (9.5) | −5.9 (21.4) | 1.3 (34.3) | 7.4 (45.3) | 12.4 (54.3) | 15.3 (59.5) | 13.6 (56.5) | 8.0 (46.4) | 1.1 (34.0) | −6.7 (19.9) | −13.7 (7.3) | 0.3 (32.6) |
| Record low °C (°F) | −29.6 (−21.3) | −26.6 (−15.9) | −21.9 (−7.4) | −21.4 (−6.5) | −6.1 (21.0) | 0.9 (33.6) | 8.0 (46.4) | 4.0 (39.2) | −2.2 (28.0) | −11.8 (10.8) | −24.0 (−11.2) | −27.4 (−17.3) | −29.6 (−21.3) |
| Average precipitation mm (inches) | 2.8 (0.11) | 4.2 (0.17) | 9.5 (0.37) | 22.9 (0.90) | 37.8 (1.49) | 52.5 (2.07) | 101.6 (4.00) | 94.5 (3.72) | 56.4 (2.22) | 25.5 (1.00) | 9.1 (0.36) | 2.4 (0.09) | 419.2 (16.5) |
| Average precipitation days (≥ 0.1 mm) | 2.6 | 3.2 | 4.1 | 4.8 | 7.2 | 11.0 | 12.8 | 12.0 | 9.1 | 6.0 | 3.7 | 3.0 | 79.5 |
| Average snowy days | 4.3 | 5.0 | 5.2 | 2.1 | 0.1 | 0 | 0 | 0 | 0 | 1.2 | 4.6 | 4.8 | 27.3 |
| Average relative humidity (%) | 55 | 49 | 42 | 38 | 40 | 51 | 64 | 68 | 63 | 56 | 54 | 54 | 53 |
| Mean monthly sunshine hours | 198.0 | 197.5 | 236.8 | 256.1 | 273.9 | 254.0 | 243.6 | 238.0 | 219.4 | 219.4 | 190.5 | 186.0 | 2,713.2 |
| Percentage possible sunshine | 66 | 65 | 64 | 64 | 61 | 57 | 54 | 57 | 59 | 64 | 65 | 64 | 62 |
Source: China Meteorological Administration
