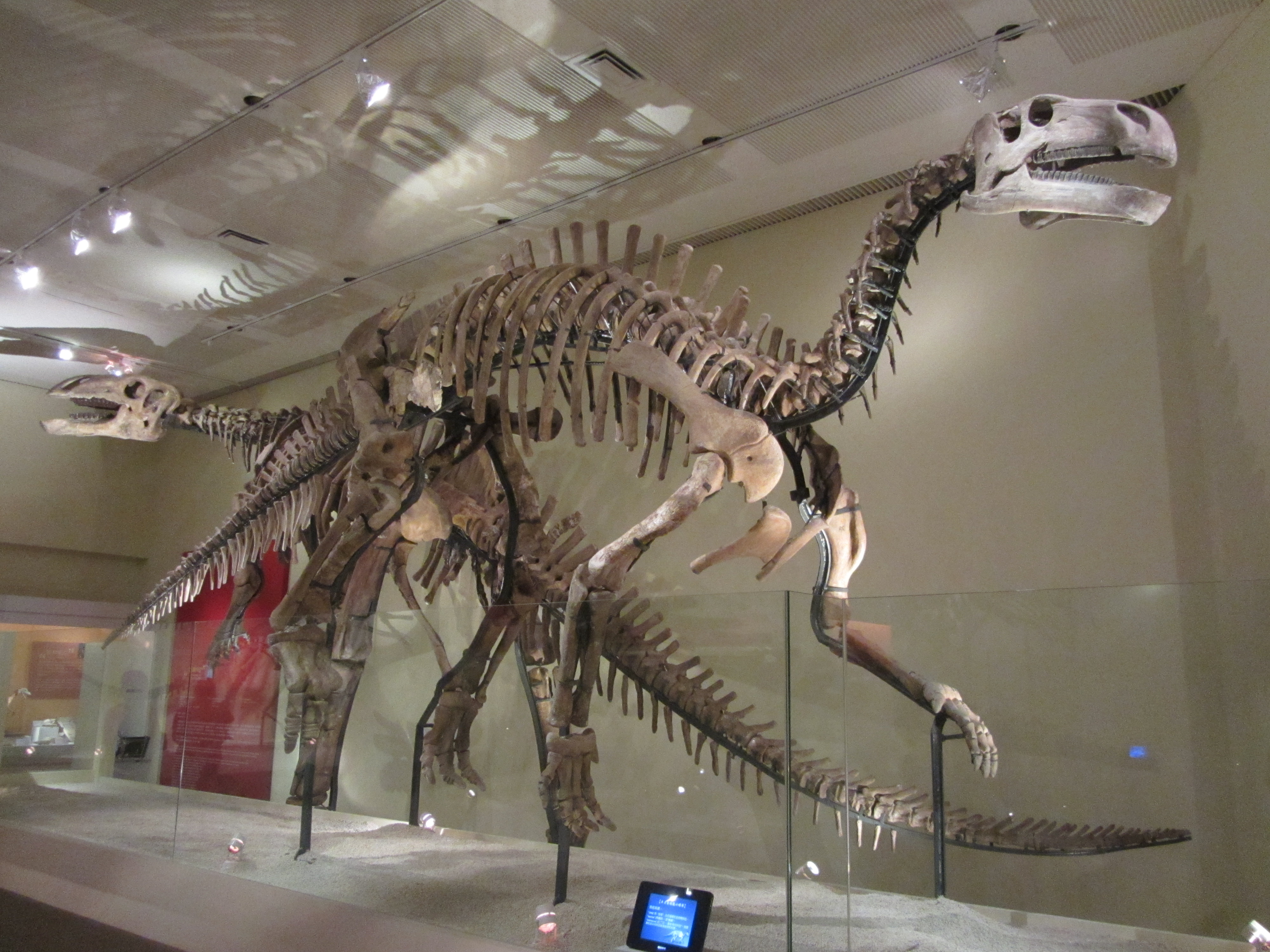
- Skeletal mount

Scientific classification
- Kingdom: Animalia
- Phylum: Chordata
- Class: Reptilia
- Clade: Dinosauria
- Clade: †Ornithischia
- Clade: †Ornithopoda
- Clade: †Hadrosauromorpha
- Genus: †Jintasaurus; You & Li, 2009
- Species: †J. meniscus

Binomial name
- †Jintasaurus meniscus You & Li, 2009

= Jintasaurus =

Jintasaurus Temporal range: Early Cretaceous, Albian

Extinct genus of dinosaurs

Jintasaurus (Chinese: 金塔龙; pinyin: Jīntǎ lóng; meaning "Jinta County dragon") is a genus of hadrosauriform dinosaur that lived during the Early Cretaceous of what is now Jiuquan, Gansu, northwestern China. The type species is J. meniscus, described by Hai-Lu You and Da-Qing Li in 2009. The holotype and only known specimen includes the postorbital skull, lacking the jugal and quadratojugal, whose discovery supports the theory that hadrosaurs originated in Asia.
