= Plesiohadros =

Plesiohadros Temporal range: Late Cretaceous, 80–71 Ma

Scientific classification
- Domain: Eukaryota
- Kingdom: Animalia
- Phylum: Chordata
- Clade: Dinosauria
- Clade: †Ornithischia
- Clade: †Ornithopoda
- Superfamily: †Hadrosauroidea
- Genus: †Plesiohadros; Tsogtbaatar et al., 2014

Type species
- Plesiohadros djadokhtaensis Tsogtbaatar et al., 2014

Extinct genus of dinosaurs

Plesiohadros (meaning "near to hadrosaurids") is an extinct genus of hadrosauroid dinosaur. It is known from a partial skeleton including the skull collected at Alag Teg locality, from the Campanian Alagteeg Formation of southern Mongolia. The type species is Plesiohadros djadokhtaensis.

== Paleoecology ==
Plesiohadros is the only known hadrosaur from the Alagteeg Formation.
