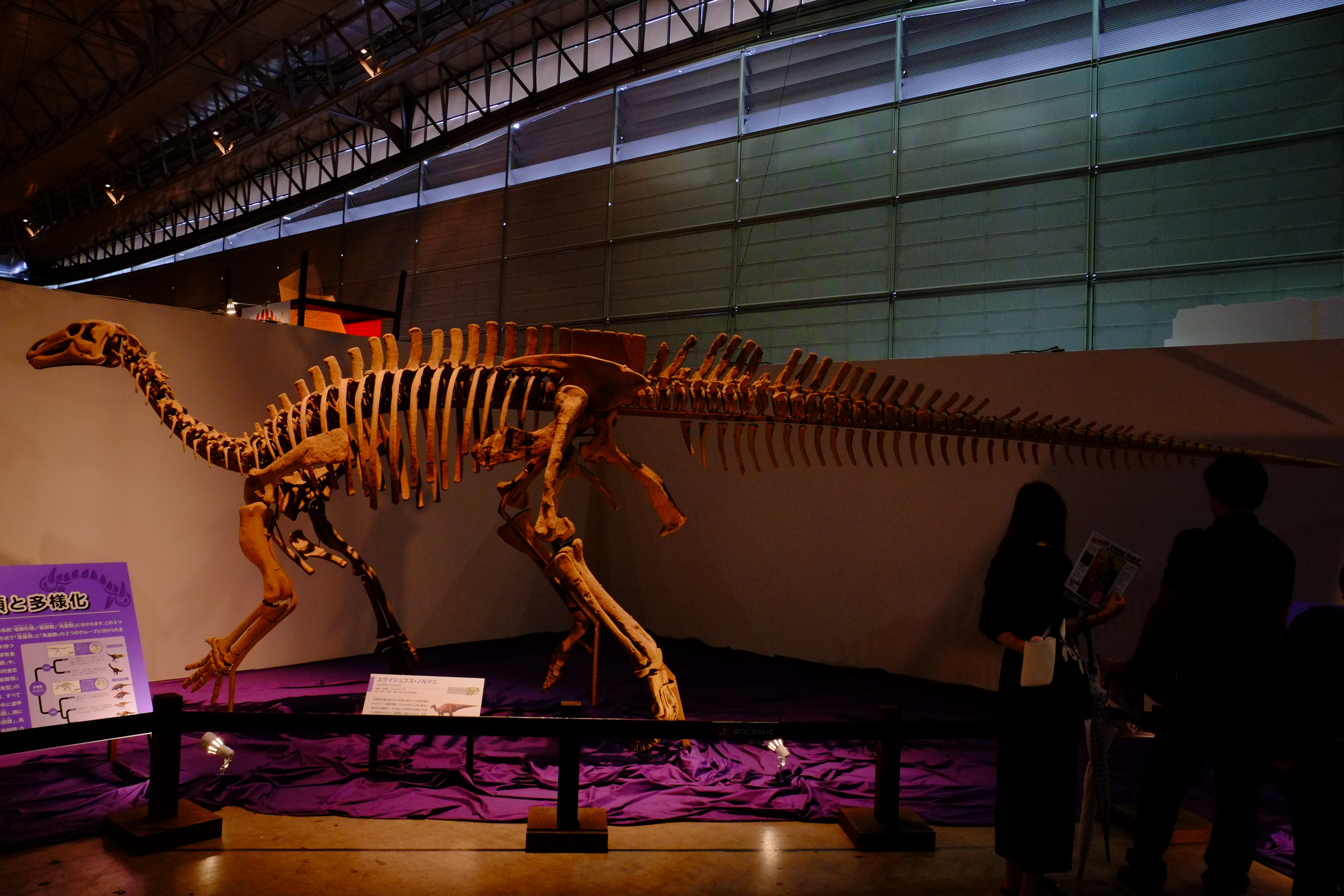
- Reconstructed skeleton

Scientific classification
- Kingdom: Animalia
- Phylum: Chordata
- Class: Reptilia
- Clade: Dinosauria
- Clade: †Ornithischia
- Clade: †Ornithopoda
- Genus: †Equijubus; You et al., 2003
- Species: †E. normani

Binomial name
- †Equijubus normani You et al., 2003

= Equijubus =

Equijubus Temporal range: Early Cretaceous, Albian

Extinct genus of dinosaurs

Equijubus (Chinese: 马鬃龙; pinyin: Mǎzōng lóng; Mǎzōng meaning "horse mane" after the area Mǎzōng Mountain 马鬃山 in which it was found), is a genus of herbivorous hadrosauroid dinosaur from the Early Cretaceous (Albian stage) of northwestern China.

== Discovery and naming ==
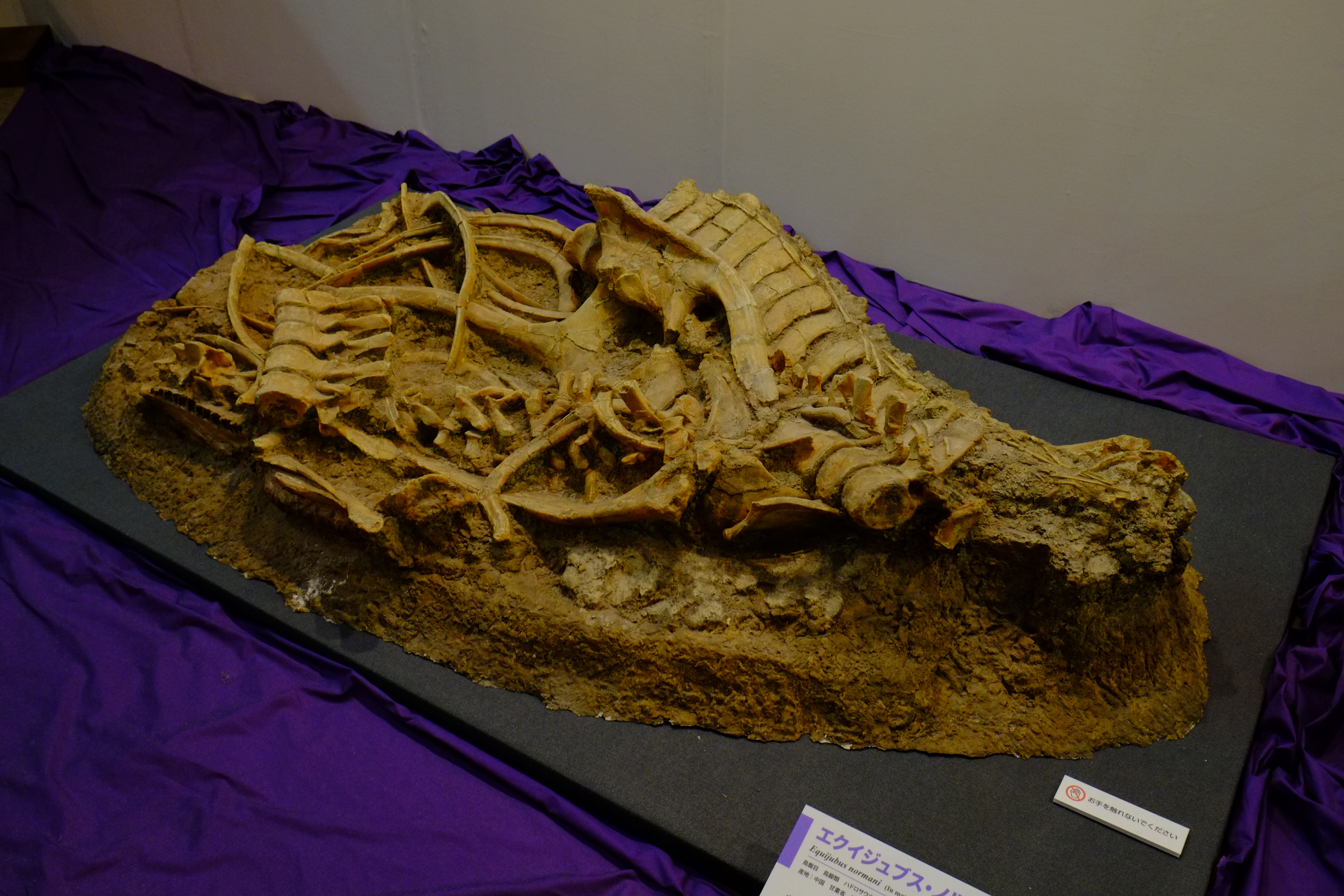
Skeleton in matrix

The type (and only known) specimen was found in the summer of 2000 by a Chinese-American expedition in the Mazong (= "horse mane") Shan area of China's Gansu Province. In 2002 You Hialu in a dissertation named and described the species Equijubus normani. The generic name is derived from Latin equus, "horse", and juba, "mane". The specific epithet "normani" is in honour of British palaeontologist David B. Norman. However, such a nomen ex dissertatione does not constitute a valid name.

The type species Equijubus normani was formally named in an article by You, Luo Zhexi, Neil Shubin, Lawrence Witmer, Tang Zhilu and Tang Feng in 2003.

The type specimen or holotype, IVPP V12534, consists of a complete skull with articulated (attached) lower jaws, plus associated incomplete postcrania: nine cervical (neck), sixteen dorsal (back), and six sacral (pelvic) vertebrae. It was found in fluvio-lacustrine sediments of the Middle Grey Unit of the Xinminpu Group, Gonpoquan Basin, Mazong Shan, Gansu Province, China.

Wu, You & Li (2018) described grass microfossils extracted from a specimen of Equijubus normani, which at the time of their description were the oldest known grass fossils, and might be the oldest known evidence of a dinosaur feeding on grasses, implying that it was most likely a grazer.

== Description ==
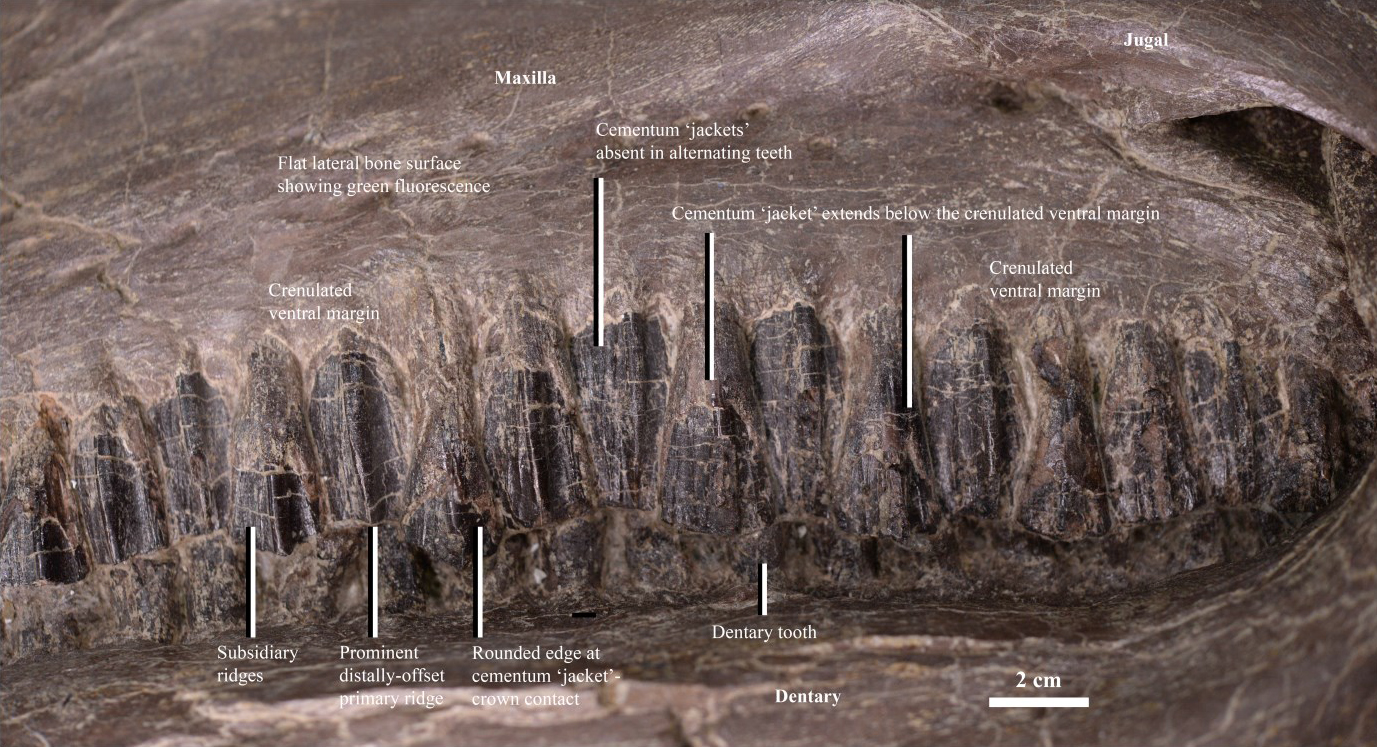
Teeth of the holotype

Equijubus is a relatively large euornithopod. Gregory S. Paul in 2010 estimated the length at seven metres, the weight at 2.5 tonnes. A palpebral bone seems to be absent, meaning the eyes were not overshadowed by an upper rim as with most related species.

== Phylogeny ==
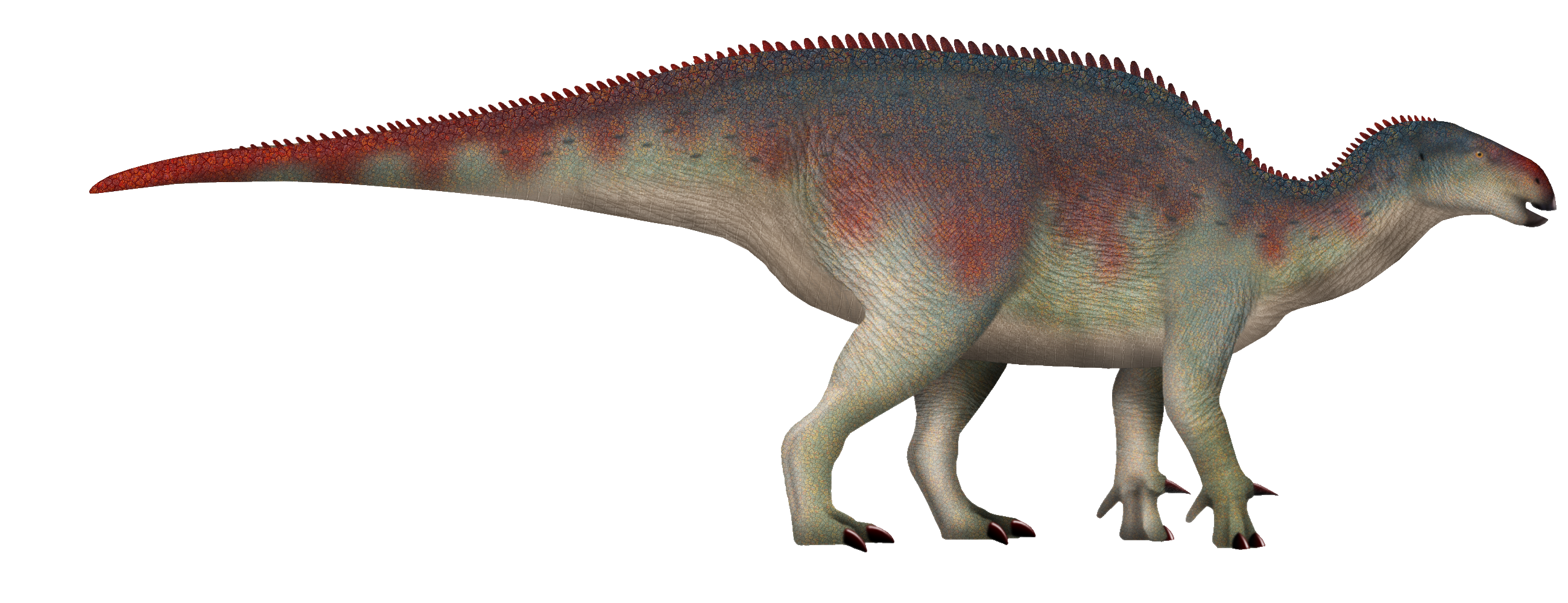
Life restoration

Equijubus was described as a basal hadrosauroid dinosaur, although it may turn out to be a non-hadrosauroid iguanodont. The discoverers considered it to be the basal-most of the hadrosauroids, and suggested that this group emerged in Asia.

== See also ==
- Timeline of hadrosaur research
