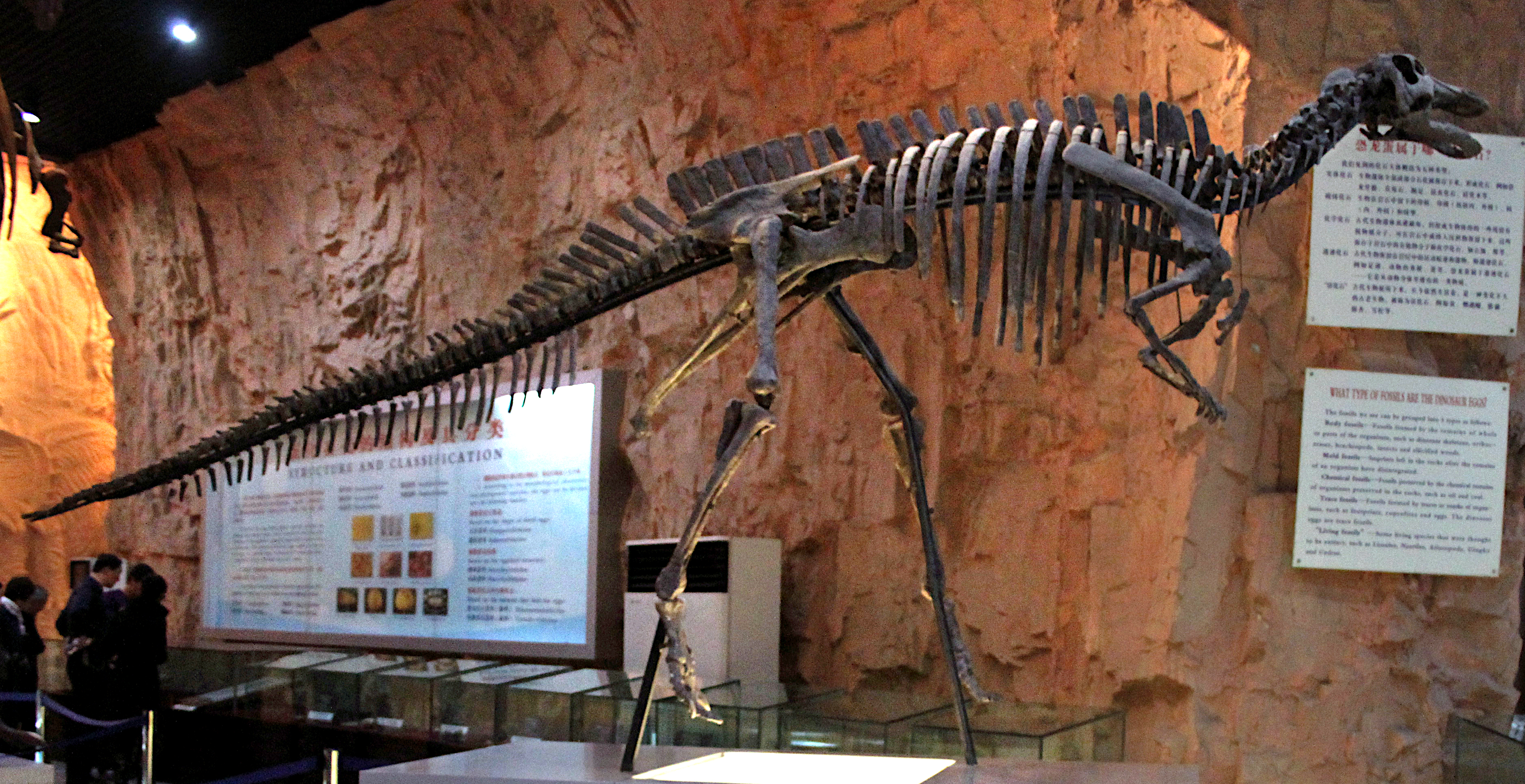
- Reconstructed skeleton, Xixia Dinosaur Park

Scientific classification
- Kingdom: Animalia
- Phylum: Chordata
- Class: Reptilia
- Clade: Dinosauria
- Clade: †Ornithischia
- Clade: †Ornithopoda
- Clade: †Hadrosauromorpha
- Genus: †Nanyangosaurus; Xu et al., 2000
- Species: †N. zhugeii

Binomial name
- †Nanyangosaurus zhugeii Xu et al., 2000

= Nanyangosaurus =

Nanyangosaurus Temporal range: Late Cretaceous, 94–72 Ma

Extinct genus of dinosaurs

Nanyangosaurus is a genus of herbivorous ornithopod dinosaur belonging to the Hadrosauromorpha that lived in the Late Cretaceous of present-day Henan Province, China.

In 1994, the remains of Nanyangosaurus were found near the village of Houzhuang, in Neixiang county in Henan. The type species, Nanyangosaurus zhugeii, was described by Xu Xing, Zhao Xijin, Lü Junchang, Huang Wanbo, Li Zhanyang, and Dong Zhiming in 2000. The generic name is derived from the city of Nanyang, while the specific name honors one of the most famous historic inhabitants of that city, the legendary strategist Zhuge Liang.

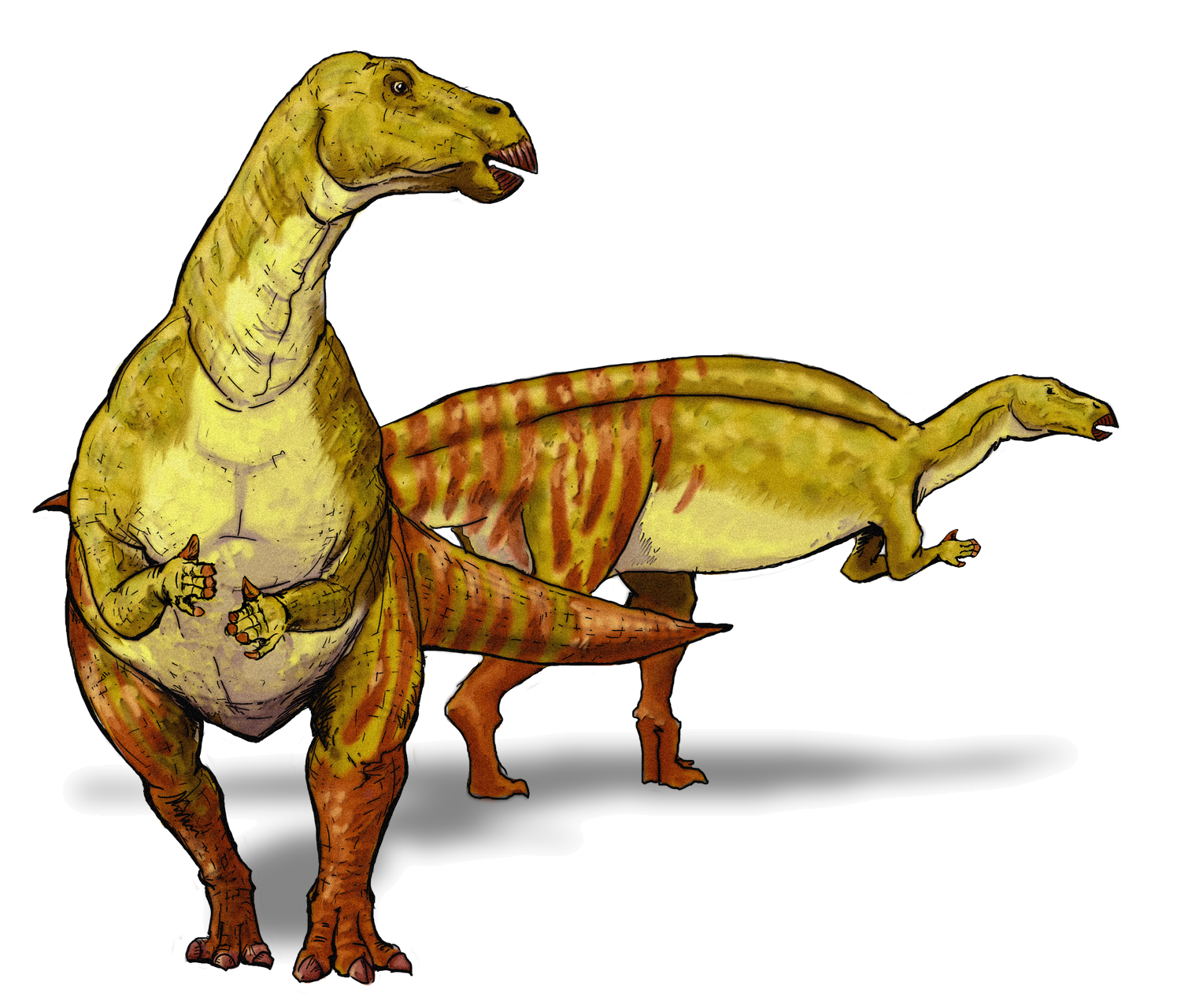
Restoration

The holotype specimen, IVPP V 11821, was excavated in the Xiaguan Formation, dating to the Turonian-Campanian stages. It consists of a partial skeleton lacking the skull. Eight posterior dorsal vertebrae, a sacrum of six vertebrae and a tail of thirty-six vertebrae have been preserved, together with a partial ischium, a forelimb and a hindlimb. Because of its primitiveness, the describers considered Nanyangosaurus to be of Albian age. Still, the type horizon is now believed to be Turonian-Campanian in age based on plant and invertebrate fossils.

Nanyangosaurus was a rather small hadrosauroid with an estimated length of 4 to 5 metres (13 to 16 ft). The length of the femur is 51.7 centimetres (20.4 in). The forelimbs were relatively long, with a long hand. The first digit of the hand was completely absent, including the first metacarpal; according to the description, this was not an accident of preservation but the actual condition of the living animal. The taxon would not have possessed the thumb spike typical of its relatives.

According to a cladistic analysis performed by the describers, Nanyangosaurus was a basal member of the Iguanodontia, more derived than Probactrosaurus and closely related to the Hadrosauroidea.
