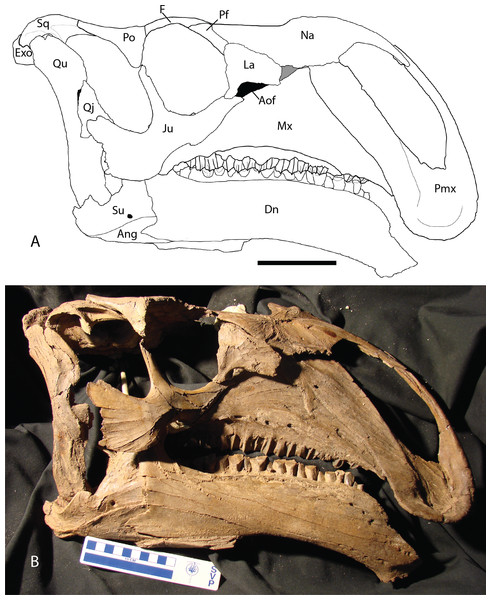
- Skull of MPC-D 100/801, drawing and physical reconstruction

Scientific classification
- Kingdom: Animalia
- Phylum: Chordata
- Class: Reptilia
- Clade: Dinosauria
- Clade: †Ornithischia
- Clade: †Ornithopoda
- Clade: †Hadrosauriformes
- Superfamily: †Hadrosauroidea
- Genus: †Choyrodon
- Species: †C. barsboldi

Binomial name
- †Choyrodon barsboldi Gates et al., 2018

= Choyrodon =

Choyrodon Temporal range: Early Cretaceous, Albian

Iguanodontian dinosaur genus from Early Cretaceous Mongolia

Choyrodon is a genus of hadrosauroid dinosaur from the Early Cretaceous (Albian) Khuren Dukh Formation of Mongolia. The type and only species is Choyrodon barsboldi. The generic name is derived from the city of Choyr, and -odon, from Latin for tooth; the specific name barsboldi honours paleontologist Rinchen Barsbold. The material consists of a holotype partial skull and cervical ribs, with two other partial skulls both with associated postcranial material. It was found to be the sister taxon of Eolambia.

== History and naming ==
Three specimens of a new iguanodontian were discovered in the Khuren Dukh Formation of Mongolia by an expedition led by Mongolian paleontologist Rinchen Barsbold. These three specimens, stored in the Mongolian Natural History Museum, were found within the same sediments that had yielded the iguanodontian Altirhinus, but comparisons showed that they represented different taxa and so in 2018 American paleontologist Terry Gates and colleagues named them Choyrodon barsboldi. The genus name is derived from the nearby city of Choyr and the Latin word for "tooth", don, while the species name is in honour of Barsbold and his contributions to Mongolian paleontology.

Three specimens of Choyrodon are known, each from a different locality of the lower member of the Khuren Dukh Formation. The holotype is MPC-D 100/801, and includes a partial but mostly complete disarticulated skull, while the referred specimens, MPC-D 100/800 and MPC-D 100/803, preserve another partial skull and fragmentary skeleton, and a fragmentary skull and partial skeleton, respectively. The quarry the holotype was found in is a thick brown-black siltstone at the Khuren Dukh locality of the formation, with an age of approximately middle to late Albian based on palynology.

== Classification ==
Gates and colleagues assessed the position of Choyrodon phylogenetically when describing the taxon, under two varying conditions. Choyrodon displays an open antorbital fenestra, which clearly distinguishes it from coexisting Altirhinus, but this feature can vary during growth so they assessed the impact of treating the fenestra as present or absent in an adult would alter relationships. They found that the presence or absence of an antorbital fenestra in adults did not significantly change the relationships of Choyrodon, with it either as the sister taxon of Eolambia or an intermediate early hadrosauroid. There was not support for interpreting Choyrodon as a juvenile Altirhinus, despite their similar anatomy, age, and location.

- Hadrosauroidea
  - Altirhinus
  - Bolong
  - Choyrodon
  - Equijubus
  - Jinzhousaurus
  - - Batyrosaurus
    - - Probactrosaurus
      - - Eolambia
        - - Protohadros
          - - Bactrosaurus
            - Levnesovia
            - - Shuangmiaosaurus
              - - Tethyshadros
                - - Telmatosaurus
                  - Hadrosauridae
