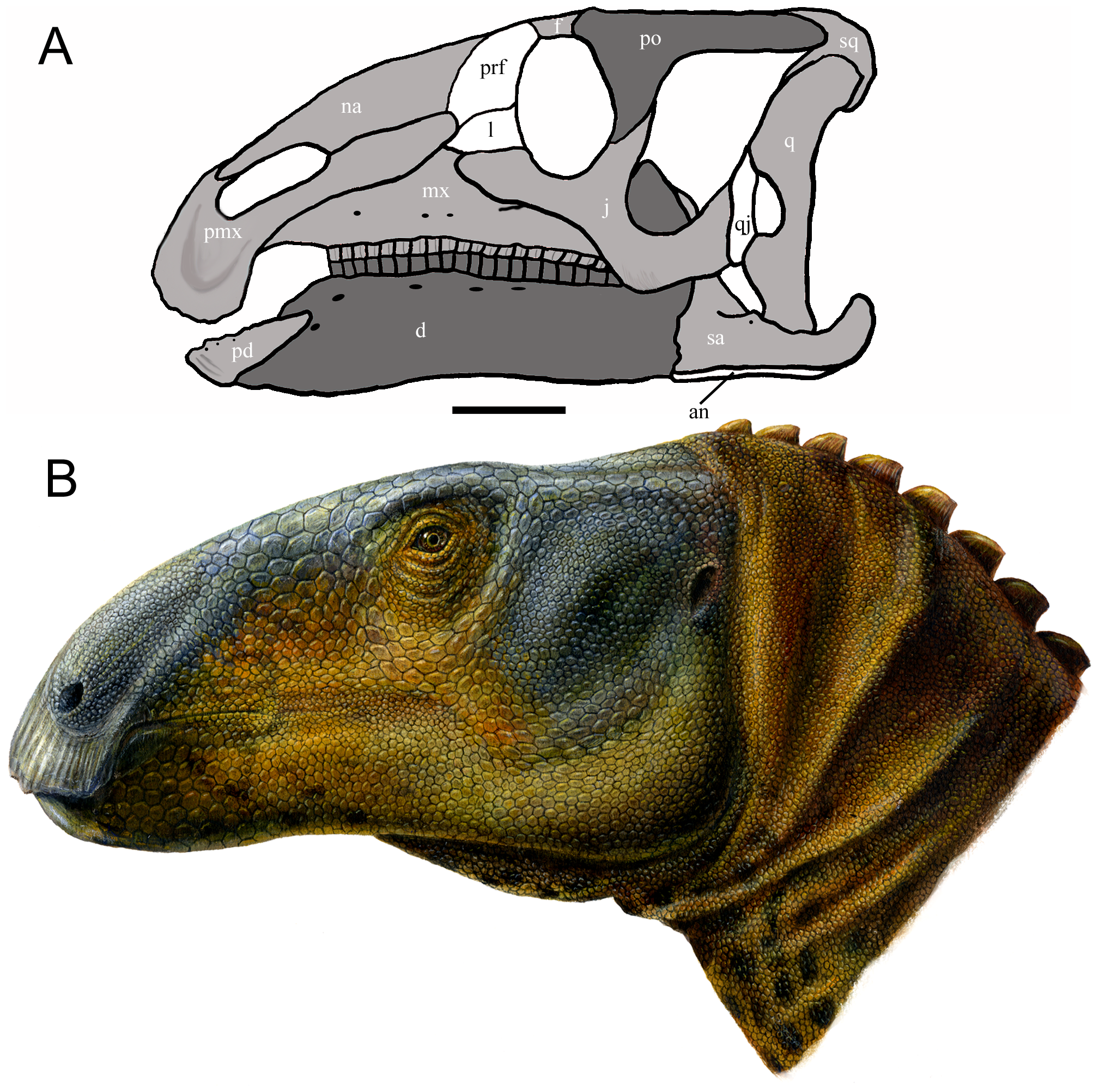
- Skull reconstruction (A) and life restoration (B)

Scientific classification
- Kingdom: Animalia
- Phylum: Chordata
- Class: Reptilia
- Clade: Dinosauria
- Clade: †Ornithischia
- Clade: †Ornithopoda
- Superfamily: †Hadrosauroidea
- Clade: †Hadrosauromorpha
- Genus: †Eolambia; Kirkland, 1998

Type species
- †Eolambia caroljonesa Kirkland, 1998

= Eolambia =

Eolambia Temporal range: Cenomanian, 96.7 Ma

Extinct genus of dinosaurs

Eolambia (meaning "dawn lambeosaurine") is a genus of herbivorous hadrosauroid dinosaur from the early Late Cretaceous of the United States. It contains a single species, E. caroljonesa, named by paleontologist James Kirkland in 1998. The type specimen of Eolambia was discovered by Carole and Ramal Jones in 1993; the species name honors Carole. Since then, hundreds of bones have been discovered from both adults and juveniles, representing nearly every element of the skeleton. All of the specimens have thus far been found in Emery County, Utah, in a layer of rock known as the Mussentuchit Member of the Cedar Mountain Formation.

Measuring up to 6 meters (20 ft) long, Eolambia is a large member of its group. While it closely approaches the Asian hadrosauroids Equijubus, Probactrosaurus, and Choyrodon, in traits of the skull, vertebrae, and limbs, it may actually be more closely related to the North American Protohadros. This grouping, based on the straightness of the quadrate bone and scapula, would represent an isolated, endemic radiation of hadrosauroids. Despite resembling hadrosaurids – lambeosaurine hadrosaurids in particular – in several features, leading to its initial identification as one of them, these similarities have been rejected as either entirely convergent or misinterpreted.

Eolambia would have lived in a forested environment at the edge of lakes in a humid floodplain environment, feeding on gymnosperms, ferns, and flowering plants. The water levels in the lakes changed over time with cyclical wet and dry spells caused by the precession of the Earth, reflected by alternating bands in the sediments of the Mussentuchit Member. As a juvenile, Eolambia would have been preyed upon by large crocodylomorphs residing in the lake waters. With increasing age, however, they became impervious to the crocodylomorphs, and mature individuals (at least eight to nine years in age) were preyed on by large theropods such as the neovenatorid Siats.

== History of discovery ==
=== Initial discoveries and description ===
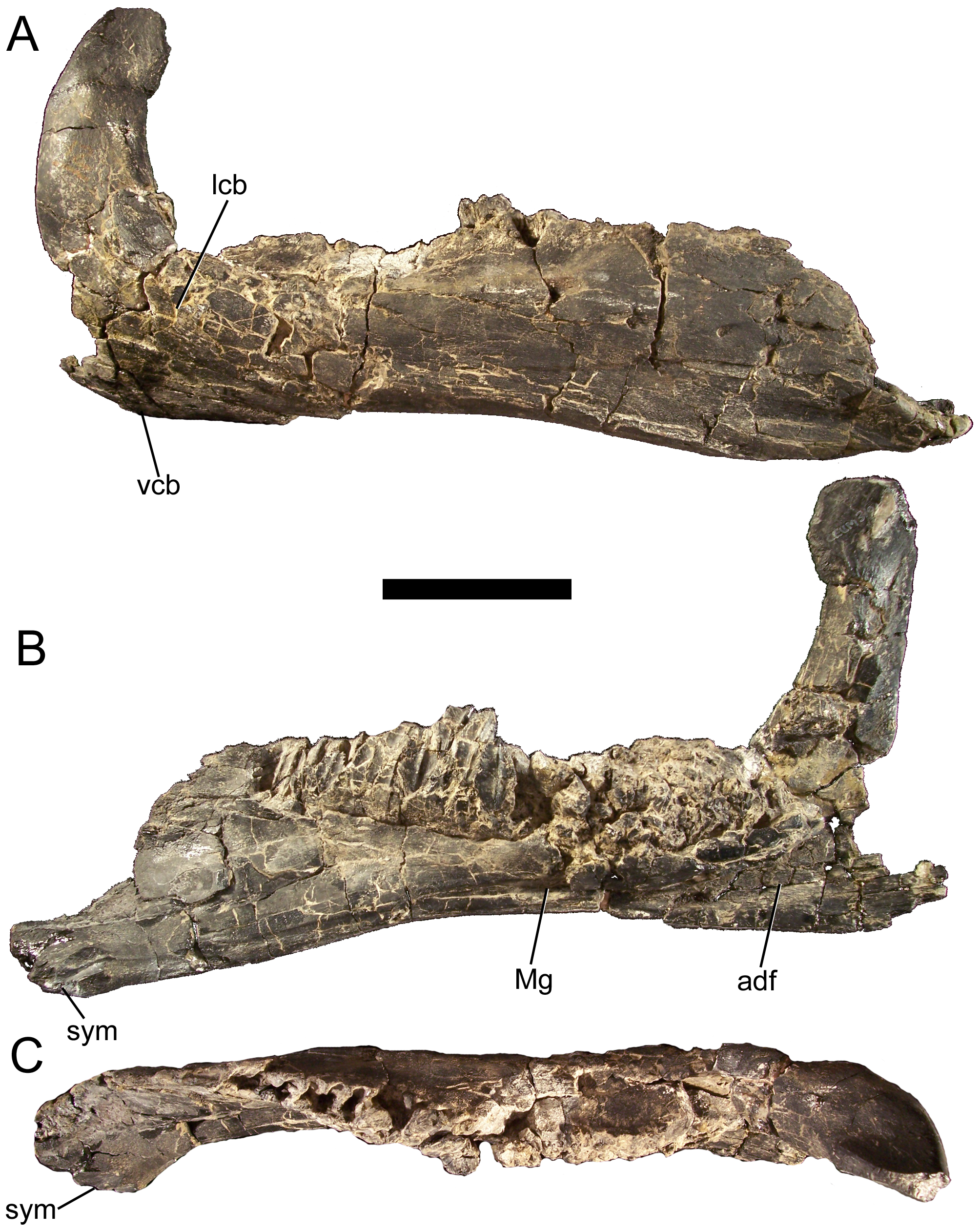
The dentary of the holotype Eolambia specimen CEUM 9758

In 1979 Peter Galton and James A. Jensen described a fragmentary right femur, BYU 2000, belonging to a hadrosaurian dinosaur discovered in sediments belonging to the Cedar Mountain Formation in Arches National Park, Utah. Though poor material, it was important for it (alongside a second North American femur described in the paper) was the first hadrosaur specimen from the Lower Cretaceous anywhere in the world. Galton and Jensen hypothesized more complete remains of a hadrosaur may be found from the formation in the future. Various hadrosauroid teeth had also been found in quarries of small vertebrates in the western region of the San Rafael Swell, near Castle Dale in Emery County, Utah; they were described in 1991 by J. Michael Parrish. Subsequently, in 1993, Carole Jones and her husband Ramal Jones discovered fragmentary bones in a fossil site located in the northwestern region of the Swell. They brought the site to the attention of Donald Burge, director of the institution then called the College of Eastern Utah Prehistoric Museum (CEUM). The site, which is formally known as CEUM Locality 42em366v, would subsequently be named Carol's Site (sic) in her honour. The fossils, stored under the specimen number CEUM 9758, represent the partial remains of an adult hadrosauroid, including parts of the skull, vertebrae, ischium, and leg. CEUM 5212, a partial skull and forelimb from an adult, was found nearby in CEUM Locality 42em369v. CEUM 8786, a left femur from an adult, was discovered later in Carol's Site, and was not described until 2012.

At the same time, the Oklahoma Museum of Natural History (OMNH) had recovered remains belonging to the same hadrosauroid from excavations in the southwestern region of the Swell. Specimens discovered by the OMNH initially consisted of six individuals from five localities: two juvenile skeletons, including vertebrae, scapulae, an ulna, an ilium and ischium, and hindlimb elements from locality OMNH v237; a partial juvenile skeleton, including parts of the skull, forelimbs, and hindlimbs along with a dorsal vertebra from OMNH v824; OMNH 27749, a sacrum and ischium from OMNH v696; OMNH 24389, an ischium from OMNH v214; and OMNH 32812, a partial skeleton including a scapula, two caudal vertebrae, and other unexcavated elements from OMNH v866. The OMNH also made further discoveries of the hadrosauroid's teeth in various quarries. Richard Cifelli of the OMNH allowed James Kirkland to study the collected specimens. Kirkland went on to preliminarily describe the specimens in 1994 in a conference abstract at the annual meeting of the Society of Vertebrate Paleontology.

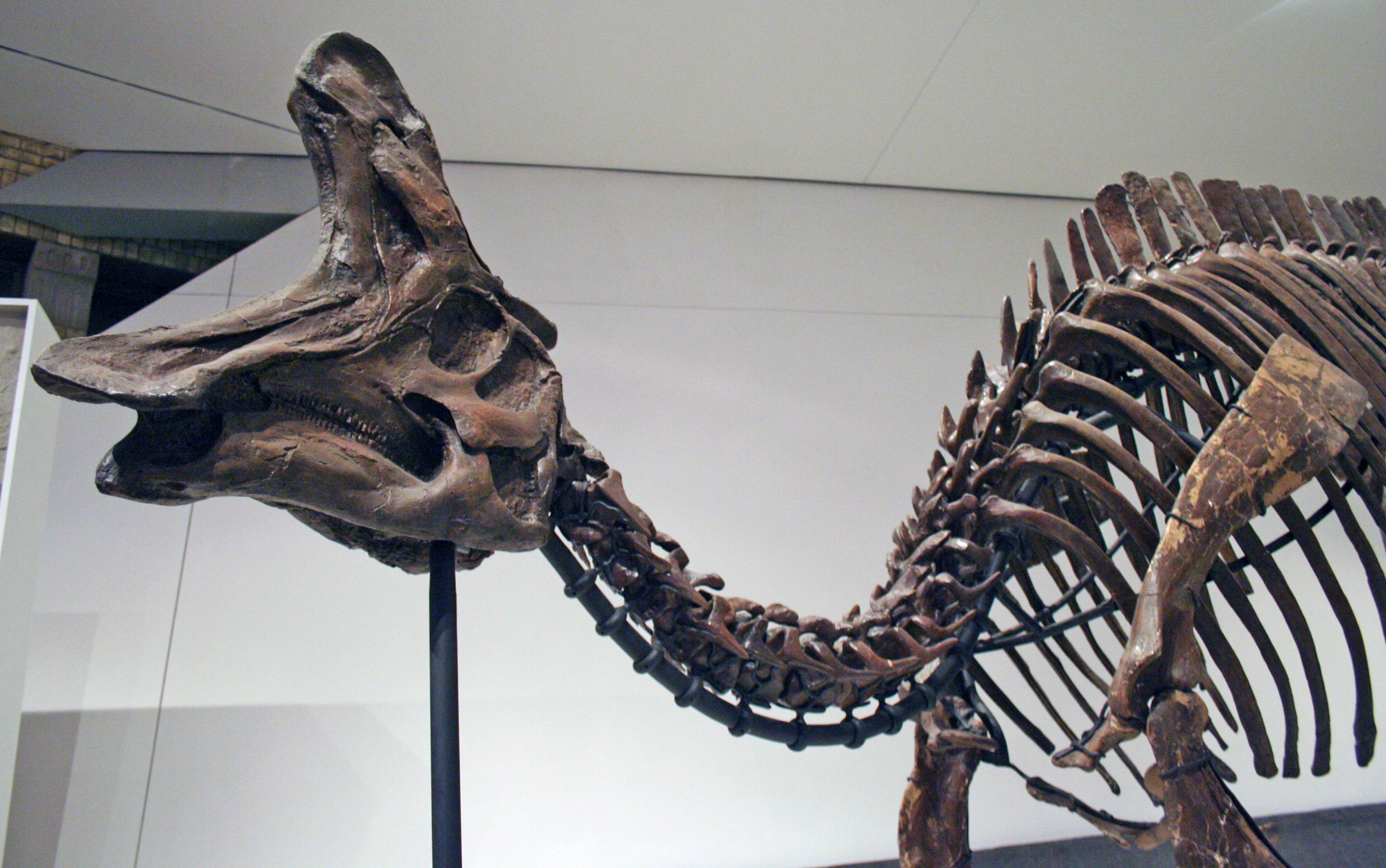
Eolambia was named after Lambeosaurus due to its initial interpretation as a basal lambeosaurine

In a 1998 paper published in the bulletin of the New Mexico Museum of Natural History and Science, Kirkland formally named the specimens as a new genus, Eolambia, with the type and only species being Eolambia caroljonesa. The generic name combines the Greek prefix eos/ἠώς ("dawn", "morning", implying "early") with the suffix lambia (derived from Lambeosaurus, which is in turn named after Canadian paleontologist Lawrence Lambe). In all, the genus name means "dawn (or early) lambeosaurine", in reference to its supposed position as the most basal lambeosaurine. Meanwhile, the specific name honors Carole Jones. The name Eolambia was suggested by paleoartist Michael Skrepnick; it replaced the informal name "Eohadrosaurus caroljonesi", which was used by Kirkland before the 1998 paper. However, the epithet caroljonesa, following the ICZN, is incorrect and in this case the correct spelling would be caroljonesae.

=== Subsequent discoveries ===
Additional excavations since 1998 have revealed additional skeletal elements belonging to Eolambia. It is now the most completely-known iguanodont from between the Cenomanian and Santonian stages. Nearly every single skeletal element belonging to the taxon is represented by multiple fossils across existing collections. At least twelve individuals, including at least eight juveniles, were discovered in a quarry south of the town of Emery, including parts from both the skull and the rest of the body. The quarry is known as the Cifelli #2 ''Eolambia caroljonesa'' Quarry, or more formally CEUM locality 42em432v. Another quarry south of the town of Emery – the Willow Springs 8 quarry, or CEUM locality 42Em576v – preserves at least four juveniles. Material from these quarries was described in 2012 by Kirkland along with Andrew McDonald, John Bird, and Peter Dodson, who also provided an updated diagnosis for Eolambia based on this material.

One specimen discovered at the Cifelli #2 quarry, a right dentary catalogued as CEUM 34447, is unusual compared to other Eolambia specimens, including both adults and juveniles. While the ratio between the mid-point depth and overall length of the dentaries in other individuals generally ranges from 0.19 to 0.24, the same value in CEUM 34447 is 0.31, making it unusually deep. The dentary also does not deepen substantially at the front end, and thus lacks one of the distinguishing traits of Eolambia dentaries. However, the other distinguishing trait, which is the expansion of the front end of the coronoid process, is present in the specimen. Although it is possible that this individual represents an unusual Eolambia specimen, McDonald and colleagues cautioned that it may represent a distinct hadrosauroid that differs in the morphology of the dentary from Eolambia (albeit one that is not suggested by any of the other materials at the quarry). Thus, they regarded it as an indeterminate basal hadrosauroid.

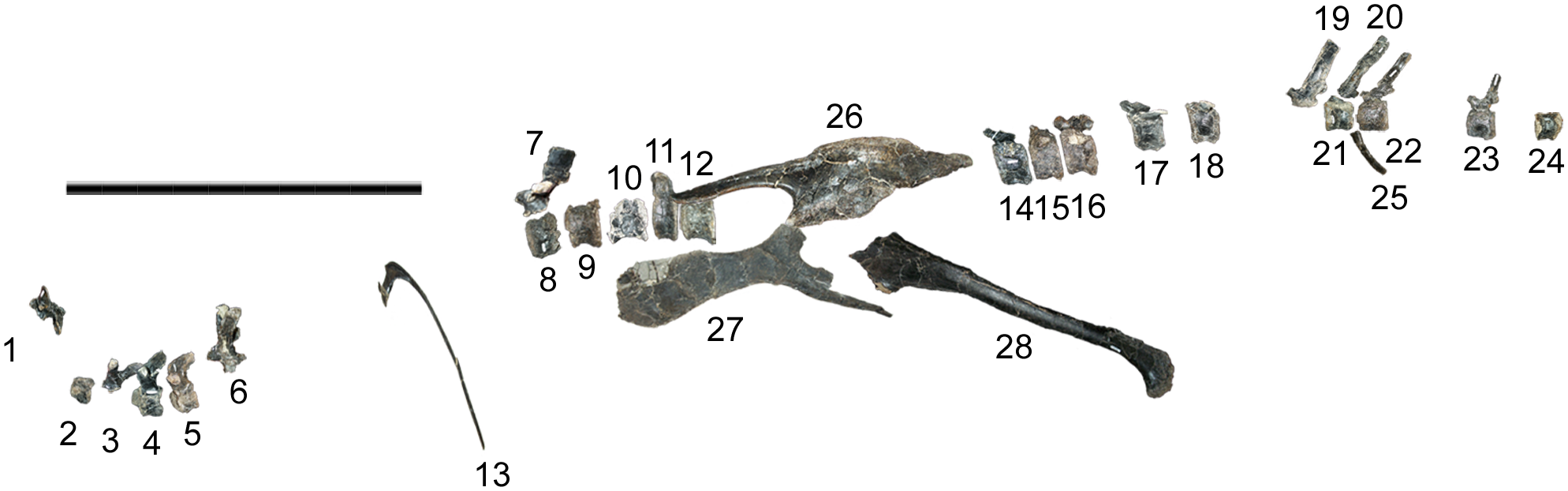
Specimen FMNH PR 3847, discovered by the Field Museum of Natural History in 2008

The Field Museum of Natural History (FMNH) also conducted excavations south of the town of Emery from 2009 to 2010, with permits from the Utah Geological Survey. These excavations were conducted in a site discovered by Akiko Shinya in 2008, FMNH locality UT080821-1, which has been named Akiko's Site in her honor. During the excavations, 167 disarticulated but closely associated elements were collected in two plaster jackets. One of these plaster jackets, containing elements from the hip and vertebrae, was given the specimen number FMNH PR 3847; the specimen was subsequently described by McDonald along with Terry Gates, Lindsay Zanno, and Peter Makovicky in 2017. Another locality discovered by the FMNH is the Triple Peak quarry, FMNH locality UT130904-2, which contains a bonebed of over 400 juvenile bones that belong to at least four individuals.

=== Geology and dating ===
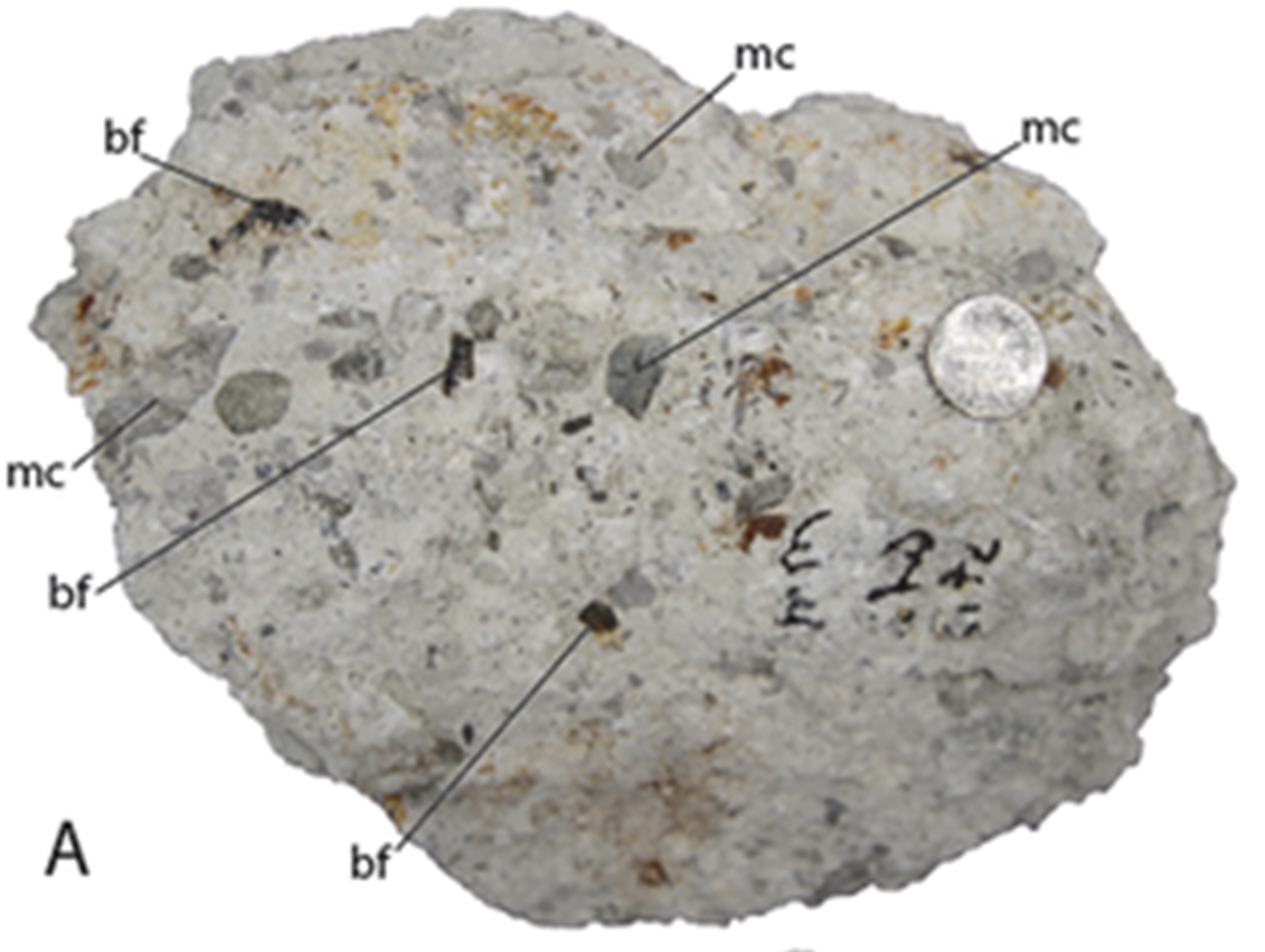
The sandstone block containing specimen FMNH PR 3847; these rocks are typical of the Mussentuchit Member

All of the localities that Eolambia were discovered in belong to the Mussentuchit Member of the Cedar Mountain Formation. Predominant rocks in the Mussentuchit consist of interleaved light gray to gray layers of muddy sandstone and mudstone. Deposits representing two separate river channel systems are also present in the Mussentuchit. The lower of these systems consists of four layers, respectively of muddy sandstone, fine-grained sandstone, silty mudstone, and fine-grained sandstone, with the latter two layers bearing plant debris. The Cifelli #2 Quarry is associated with this system. The upper system consists of greenish fine-grained sandstone. Three layers of bentonite clay layers, representing volcanic ash deposits, are also present in the Mussentuchit, being respectively whitish-gray, yellow, and tan in color. The middle of these layers cuts through the Cifelli #2 Quarry. Bentonite is also present within the sandstone itself throughout the Mussentuchit. In the Cifelli #2 quarry, the bones themselves are blackened, having been replaced by calcite, quartz, pyrite, and carbonate-hydroxyapatite.

Palynology (the study of pollen), as well as studies of fossil megaflora and invertebrates, had initially suggested that the uppermost Cedar Mountain Formation – including the Mussentuchit – dated to the Albian stage. A 1997 argon-argon dating of sanidine crystals recovered from a volcanic ash layer in the upper Cedar Mountain Formation by Cifelli and colleagues indicated an age of 97 ± 0.1 million years, which was then considered to be just after the boundary between the Albian and Cenomanian stages. This is similar to the early Cenomanian age reported for the overlying Dakota Formation. Subsequently, in 2007, James Garrison and colleagues dated the volcanic ash layer passing through the Cifelli #2 Quarry – which is likely the same layer dated previously by Cifelli and colleagues – to 96.7 ± 0.5 million years ago. At an approximate level, the Cifelli and Garrison estimates agree with each other, thus indicating a Cenomanian age for Eolambia. Garrison and colleagues also re-analyzed the pollen assemblage from localities throughout the Mussentuchit, concluding that the assemblage spans the Albian-Cenomanian boundary.

== Description ==
Eolambia is a large hadrosauroid. Initial estimates placed the length of its skull at 1 meter (3 ft 3 in) in length, although this was due to a disproportionately long snout that was later corrected by the discovery of additional material. In 2016, Gregory S. Paul estimated a body length of 6 meters (20 ft) and a weight of 1 metric ton (0.98 long tons; 1.1 short tons) for Eolambia, which agrees with a prior body length estimate of 6.1 meters (20 ft) by Thomas R. Holtz Jr. in 2012. Earlier, in 2008, an adult specimen was estimated as having a length of 5.2 meters (17 ft) and a height at the hip of 2 meters (6 ft 7 in).

=== Skull ===
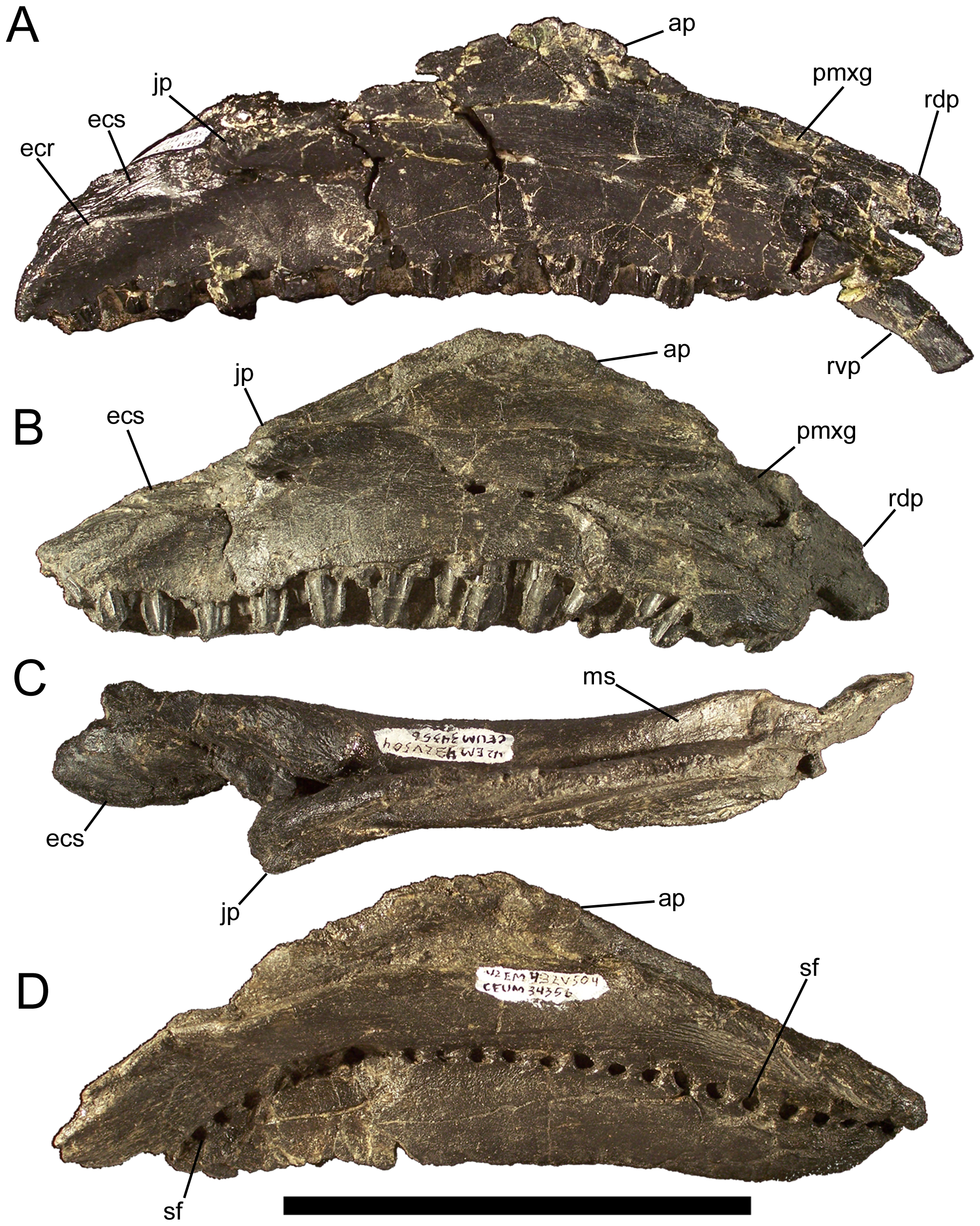
Maxillae of Eolambia

The crestless skull of Eolambia has a similar overall shape to those of Equijubus and Probactrosaurus. The front of the snout is highly roughened, being punctuated by many foramina (openings). At the tip of each premaxilla, there are two tooth-like structures known as denticles, which is also seen in its closest relative Protohadros. Further back, the rear portion of the lower branch of the premaxilla abruptly projects upwards, closing off the nostril at the rear as in Probactrosaurus, Protohadros, and other hadrosauroids. This part joins with the two finger-like processes of the maxilla, which is similar to Protohadros. The body of the maxilla itself does not bear a recess or any indication of an antorbital fenestra, like Equijubus, Protohadros, and other hadrosauroids. One of the characteristics used to distinguish Eolambia is the concave profile of the tooth row of the maxilla when viewed from the side, which is like Equijubus, Probactrosaurus, and several other hadrosauriforms but unlike Protohadros.

Like Probactrosaurus and other hadrosauroids, the back of the maxilla connects to the jugal – which borders the bottom of the eye socket and infratemporal fenestra – through a finger-like projection that fits into a recess. The bottom margin of the jugal bears a strong flange beneath the level of the infratemporal fenestra; this is also seen in Equijubus, Probactrosaurus, Protohadros, and several other hadrosauroids. Connecting to the jugal from above is the postorbital, which has a roughened surface where it borders the eye sockets (like Protohadros), but the side of the bone is otherwise smooth. At the back of the skull, the quadrate articulates with the squamosal with a joint that is D-shaped when viewed from the top. The left and right squamosals would have contacted each other extensively, being only separated at the back by a small process of the parietal. The supraoccipital bone, which forms the top portion of the back of the skull, is flat and nearly vertical, as is the case in Probactrosaurus and other hadrosauroids.\

As with the premaxilla, the predentary of Eolambia bore denticles. There is a prominent dorsomedial process, a tab-like structure also seen in Probactrosaurus and other hadrosauriforms. Several additional tab-like denticles were present on either side of the dorsomedial process, which are likewise present in Probactrosaurus. The predentary is joined at the back by the dentary, which constitutes most of the lower jaw. There is a short recess, or diastema, between the articulation of the predentary with the dentary and the first tooth position on the dentary, which is observed in Equijubus, Probactrosaurus, and other hadrosauroids. The front of the dentary characteristically deepens, as in Protohadros, Ouranosaurus, and Bactrosaurus. Two bulges are present on the outer surface of the dentary, one of them representing the coronoid process as in Probactrosaurus and other hadrosauroids. Like Protohadros and several other hadrosauriforms but unlike Probactrosaurus, only the front end of this process is thickened. As in Equijubus, Probactrosaurus, and various other iguanodonts, a small foramen is present on the side of the surangular, which is located behind the dentary.

Similar to other iguanodonts, the teeth of Eolambia are arranged in tightly-spaced and interlocking rows. At any given time, each of the 32 maxillary tooth sockets holds three teeth, while each of the 30 dentary tooth sockets holds four teeth. Out of these, two of the teeth in each socket are replacement teeth like those of Probactrosaurus; the others are active teeth. Every active tooth has one wear facet. Like Probactrosaurus, Gongpoquansaurus, Protohadros, and other hadrosauroids, each maxillary tooth crown has only one ridge, which is slightly offset towards the midline of the mouth. Meanwhile, each dentary tooth crown characteristically bears a primary ridge, and an accessory ridge closer to the midline of the mouth, a condition which is also present in Protohadros and other hadrosauroids. All of the crowns also bear small, denticle-like serrations on the front and rear edges, which is also seen in Probactrosaurus.

=== Vertebral column ===
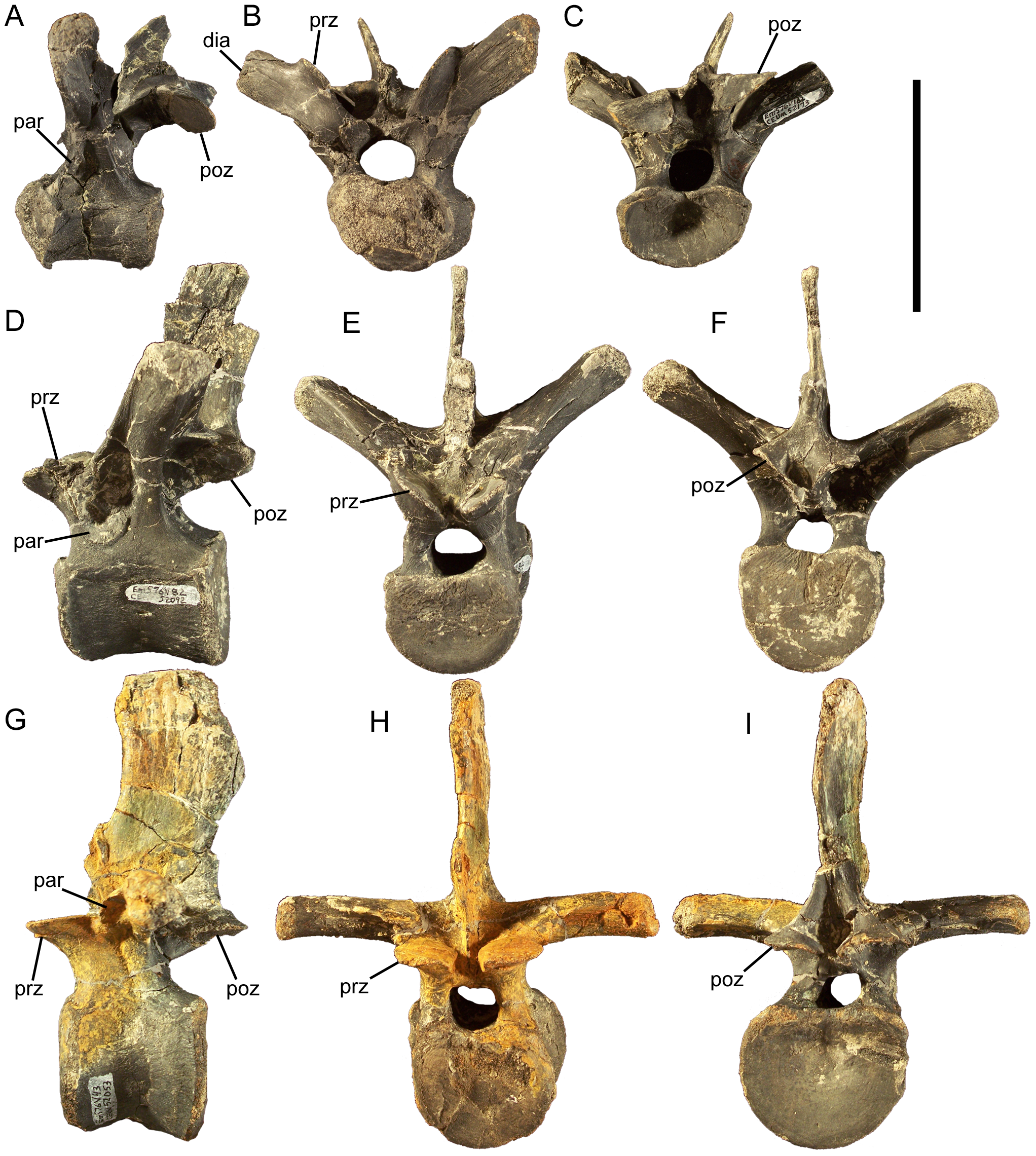
Dorsal vertebrae of Eolambia, showing transition in location of vertebral processes

Like Equijubus, Probactrosaurus, Gongpoquansaurus, and other styracosternans, Eolambia has cervical vertebrae which are very opisthocoelous, meaning that their front ends are strongly convex while their back ends are strongly concave. Unusually, the front end of the third cervical is set slightly higher than the back end, which is not seen in any other cervical vertebrae. Vertebrae from further back in the neck have a greater angle between the elongate articular processes known as the postzygapophyses, and also more elongate transverse processes. On the transverse processes, there are further articular processes – the rounded parapophyses and rod-like diapophyses – are located. In the rearmost cervicals, there is also a deep depression separating the postzygapophyses, and the neural spines have steeply-angled front margins, which has the effect of creating prominent spike-like projections.

The first few dorsal vertebrae are similar to the cervical vertebrae, but have taller and more prong-like neural spines. The rest are amphiplatyan, meaning that they are flat at both ends. They also have postzygapophyses which are less elongate and more pedestal-like, in addition to taller and more rectangular neural spines. The parapophyses, which are depressions instead of projections, have moved off from the transverse processes to the neural arch, between the transverse processes and the articular processes known as the prezygapophyses at the front of the vertebrae. However, they move back onto the base of the transverse processes in the last few dorsals. In the third or fourth dorsal, the parapophysis is located very close to the suture between the neural spine and the centrum, which is unlike the other dorsals but similar to the first few dorsals in Edmontosaurus. Also like Edmontosaurus, the median ridge separating the prezygapophyses become more pronounced in the rear dorsals.

Among the Eolambia specimens found to date, the best-preserved sacrum includes seven vertebrae. Given that this individual is immature, and hadrosaurs increase their sacral vertebra count with age, adults may have had more sacrals. The caudal (tail) vertebrae are amphicoelous, having both the front and back ends being concave. They have pedestal-like prezygapophyses and tab-like postzygapophyses, the latter of which are separated by a depression. The prezygapophyses lengthen to become stalks and the postzygapophyses shrink in the middle and rear caudals. Furthermore, the neural spines transition from rectangular to strongly curved (concave in front and convex behind), the centra become more elongated, and the transverse processes disappear as well.

=== Limbs and limb girdles ===
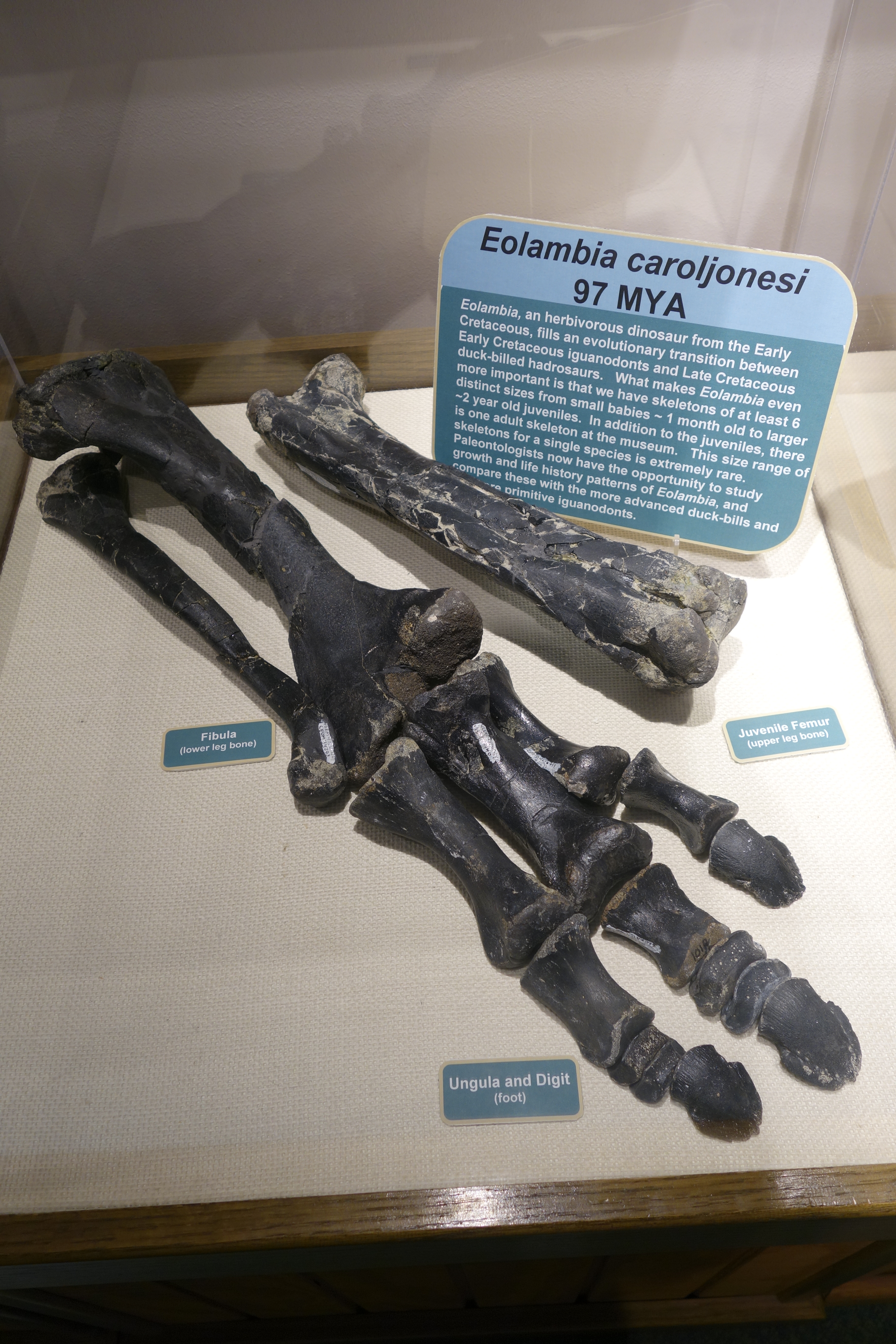
Lower leg of Eolambia

Like Probactrosaurus, the scapular blade of Eolambia is nearly rectangular, with the sides of the blade being straight and meeting the end of the blade at an almost-right angle. The humerus is bowed towards the midline, and the deltopectoral crest on the humerus is prominently thickened. A knob is present on the outer surface of the joint with the radius on the humerus. Both the ulna and the radius are relatively straight bones. The top of the ulna bears three "prongs", namely the olecranon process and two additional triangular flanges. Meanwhile, the radius bears a flattened inner surface at the top end, and a distinct platform on the inner surface at the bottom end, both for articulating with the ulna. The hand has five digits. Among the metacarpal bones of the hand, the second is curved, the third is straight, and the fourth is strongly curved. Like Iguanodon, Probactrosaurus, and other basal iguanodonts, the claw on the first digit is distinctively conical. The second and third claws are hoof-like, with the third claw bearing roughened flanges on its sides – a trait also shared with other iguanodonts.

The preacetabular (i.e. located in front of the hip socket) process of the ilium bears a horizontal "boot" which forms an obtuse angle with the bottom of the process. Additionally, the top edge of the bone projects outwards to form a rim located above the ilium-ischium articulation on the bottom edge of the bone. These traits are also seen in Probactrosaurus and other iguanodonts. The hip socket itself is quite large relative to the ilium for an iguanodont. A distinctive flange is present along the top surface of the ilium, a trait which is shared with an unnamed hadrosauroid from the Woodbine Formation. The postacetabular (i.e. located behind the hip socket) process of the ilium tapers at its rear with no break in its top margin. On the pubis, the forward-projecting process expands towards the front, like Probactrosaurus, Gongpoquansaurus, and other iguanodonts. The shaft of the ischium is characteristically straight in adults (juveniles have a curved shaft, which is more common among iguanodonts), and the bottom of the shaft bears a compressed "boot" that is expanded forwards.

Like the humerus, the femur is bowed, but outwards. However, characteristically, the bottom half of the femur is straight. The fourth trochanter, located halfway down the femur, is vertically tall and triangular, similar to Probactrosaurus, Gongpoquansaurus, and other iguanodonts but dissimilar to more basal ornithopods. Like the ulna and radius, the tibia and fibula have straight shafts, and they articulate with each other; a roughened projection on the bottom of the fibula fits between two bulb-like condyles located just behind the cnemial crest on the bottom end of the tibia. The top of the tibia is rough, indicating the presence of a cap of cartilage between the femur and tibia. The foot has four digits. Like the metacarpals, the second metatarsal is curved, the third is straight, and the fourth is strongly curved. The phalanges of the foot are very stout, with the terminal phalanges near the end of each digit being particularly stout. As with the second and third claws on the hand, the second, third, and fourth claws of the foot are uniformly broad, flat, and hoof-like.

== Classification ==
=== Initial hadrosaurid identification ===
In Kirkland's initial description of Eolambia, he considered it to be a member of the Hadrosauridae, as defined by David B. Weishampel, David B. Norman, and Dan Grigorescu in 1993. Weishampel and colleagues used seven unifying characteristics to define the Hadrosauridae: the upward expansion of the ascending process of the maxilla; the absence of the paraquadrate foramen, which separates the quadrate and quadratojugal; the location of the angular on the inner surface of the lower jaw; the absence of the surangular foramen on the surangular; the narrow teeth of the maxilla; the presence of three or more teeth in each dentary tooth position; and the reduction of the top margin of the scapular blade. The first, fifth, sixth, and seventh of these traits were recognized in Eolambia, with the rest being unknown due to missing material. Kirkland further assigned Eolambia to the Euhadrosauria, defined by Weishampel and colleagues to include the common ancestor of Hadrosaurinae (now the Saurolophinae) and Lambeosaurinae – the two primary branches of hadrosaurids – and all of its descendants. This assignment was based on five characteristics, all present in Eolambia: the presence of denticles on the premaxilla; the quadrate's narrow joint with the lower jaw; the narrow dentary teeth; the presence of a single edge, or carina, on each dentary tooth; and the angled deltopectoral crest on the humerus.

Within the Hadrosauridae, Kirkland further considered Eolambia to either be a basal member of the Lambeosaurinae, or the sister group of Lambeosaurinae. He identified five characteristics shared with the Lambeosaurinae, as defined across various studies: the absence of a foramen on the premaxilla; the (at least partial) enclosure of the nostril by the premaxilla; the development of a shelf on the maxilla; the very tall neural spines of the caudal vertebrae; the robustness of the humerus; and the large "boot" of the ischium in adults. Kirkland found that two additional traits separated the crestless Eolambia from other, crested lambeosaurines, which were considered as being related to the development of the crest: the elevation of the nasal cavity above the eye socket, and the shortening of the parietal. If Eolambia were to be recognized as a lambeosaurine, then the Lambeosaurinae would have to be redefined to exclude those two traits. Alternatively, if Eolambia was instead the sister group of the Lambeosaurinae, then it would represent a morphology in hadrosaurids that is close to the divergence between hadrosaurines and lambeosaurines. This possibility is supported by the presence of a groove on the bottom of the sacrum of Eolambia, which was recognized by Kirkland as a defining trait of hadrosaurines – albeit one convergently present in the Ankylosauria and Ceratopsia.

To support the lambeosaurine affinities of Eolambia, Kirkland conducted a phylogenetic analysis; the tree recovered by his analysis, which accordingly places Eolambia as the most basal lambeosaurine, is reproduced below. Despite the evidence he cited in support of this position, Kirkland also noted a seemingly inconsistent trait. As observed in the juvenile ilium he initially described, the antitrochanter – a projection on the ilium that limits the greater trochanter of the femur – is more poorly developed than would be expected for a basal hadrosaurid. Michael Brett-Surman noted that adults may have had a better-developed antitrochanter. On the other hand, the derived lambeosaurine Hypacrosaurus has a well-developed antitrochanter even at the hatchling stage. Kirkland noted the possibility that basal hadrosaurids developed their antitrochanter later in life than derived hadrosaurids such as Hypacrosaurus. He thus remarked that adult Eolambia specimens would resolve this issue.

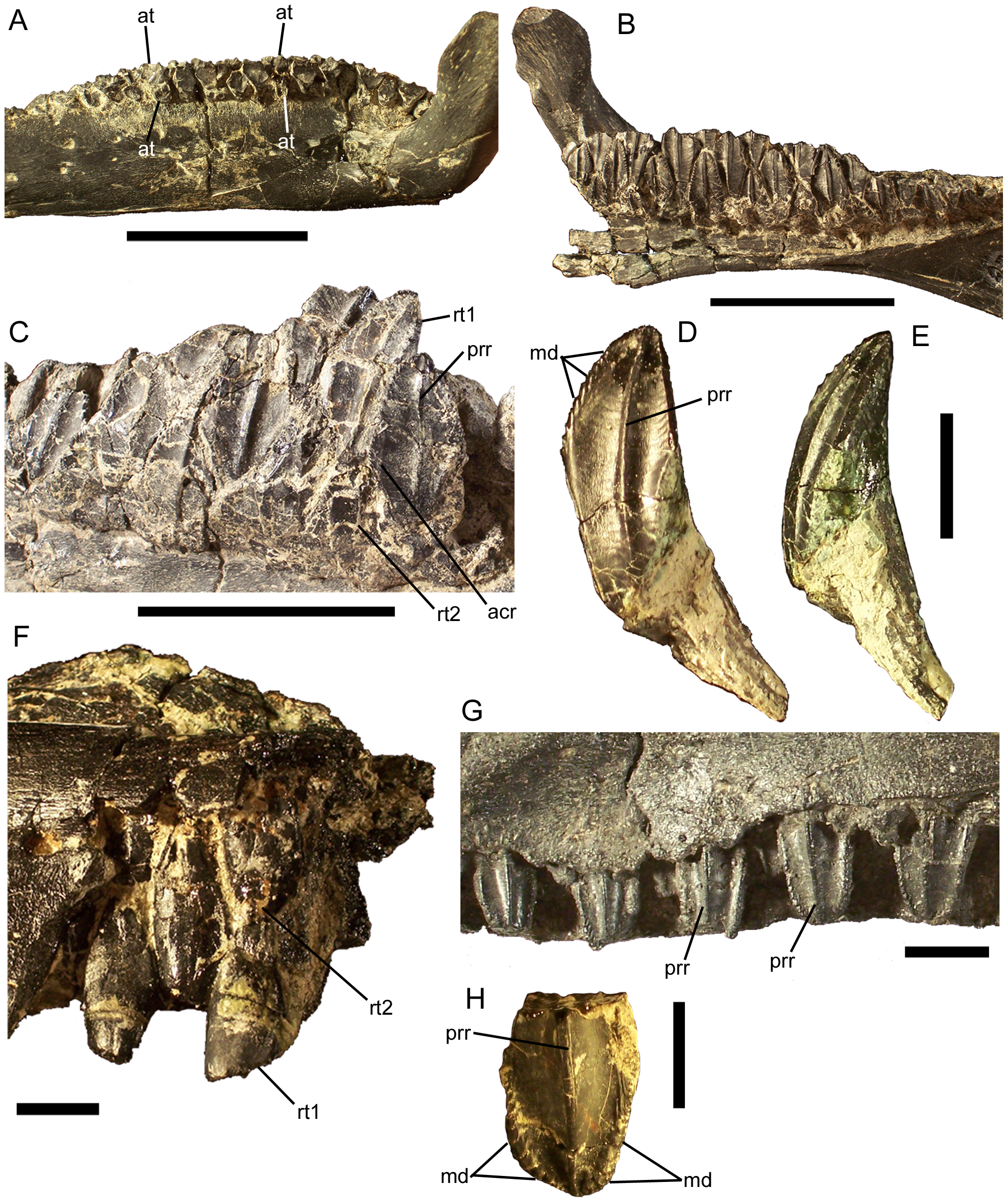
Teeth of Eolambia

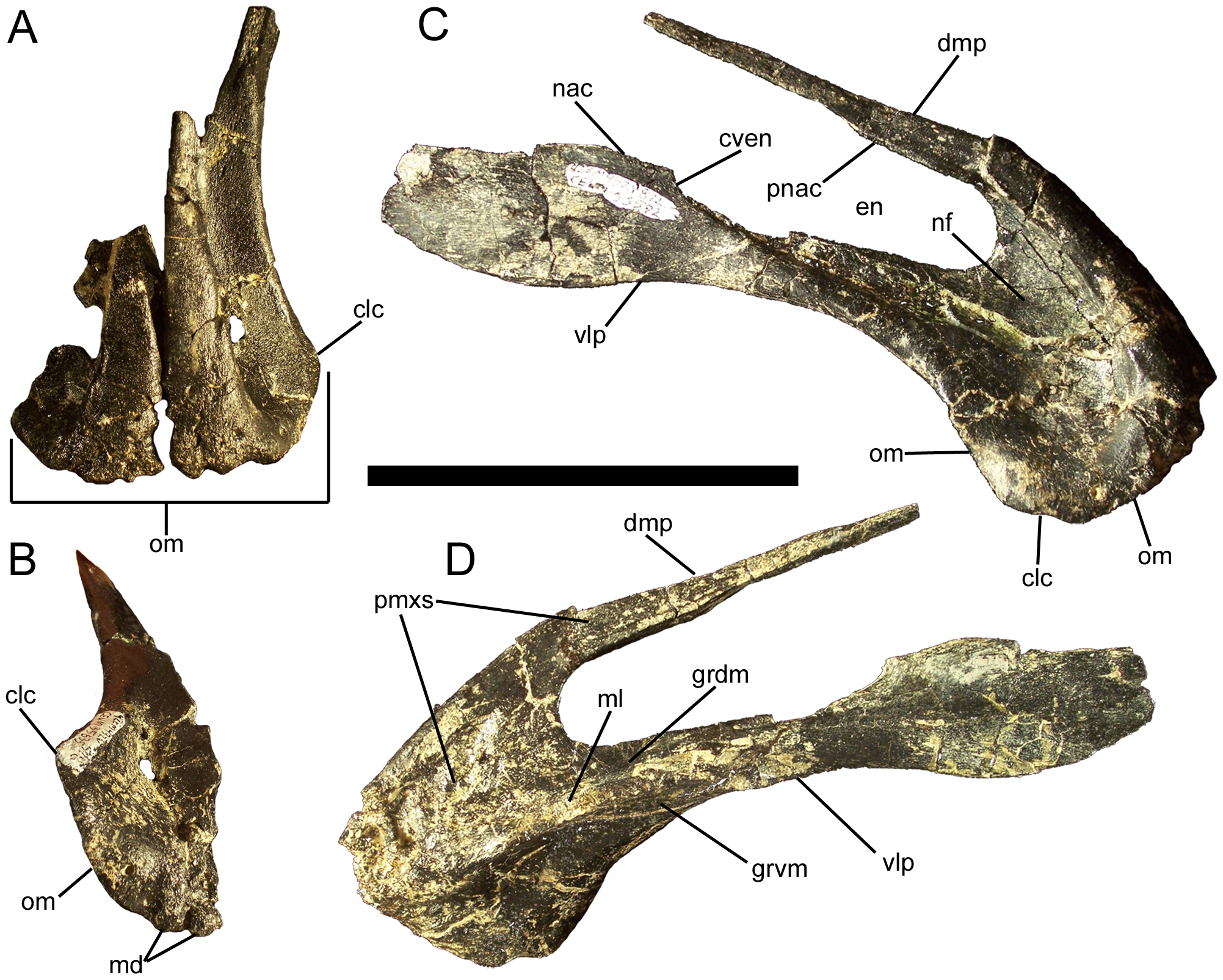
Premaxilla of Eolambia

- - - Iguanodon
    - Ouranosaurus
  - - Probactrosaurus
    - Hadrosauridae
      - Telmatosaurus
      - - Gilmoreosaurus
        - Euhadrosauria
          - Hadrosaurinae (=Saurolophinae)
            - - Gryposaurus
              - - Maiasaura
                - Brachylophosaurus
            - - - Edmontosaurus
                - Anatotitan (Edmontosaurus annectens)
              - - Prosaurolophus
                - Saurolophus
          - Lambeosaurinae
            - Eolambia
            - - Bactrosaurus
              - - Parasaurolophus
                - - Corythosaurus
                  - - Hypacrosaurus
                    - Lambeosaurus

=== Reidentification as non-hadrosaurid ===
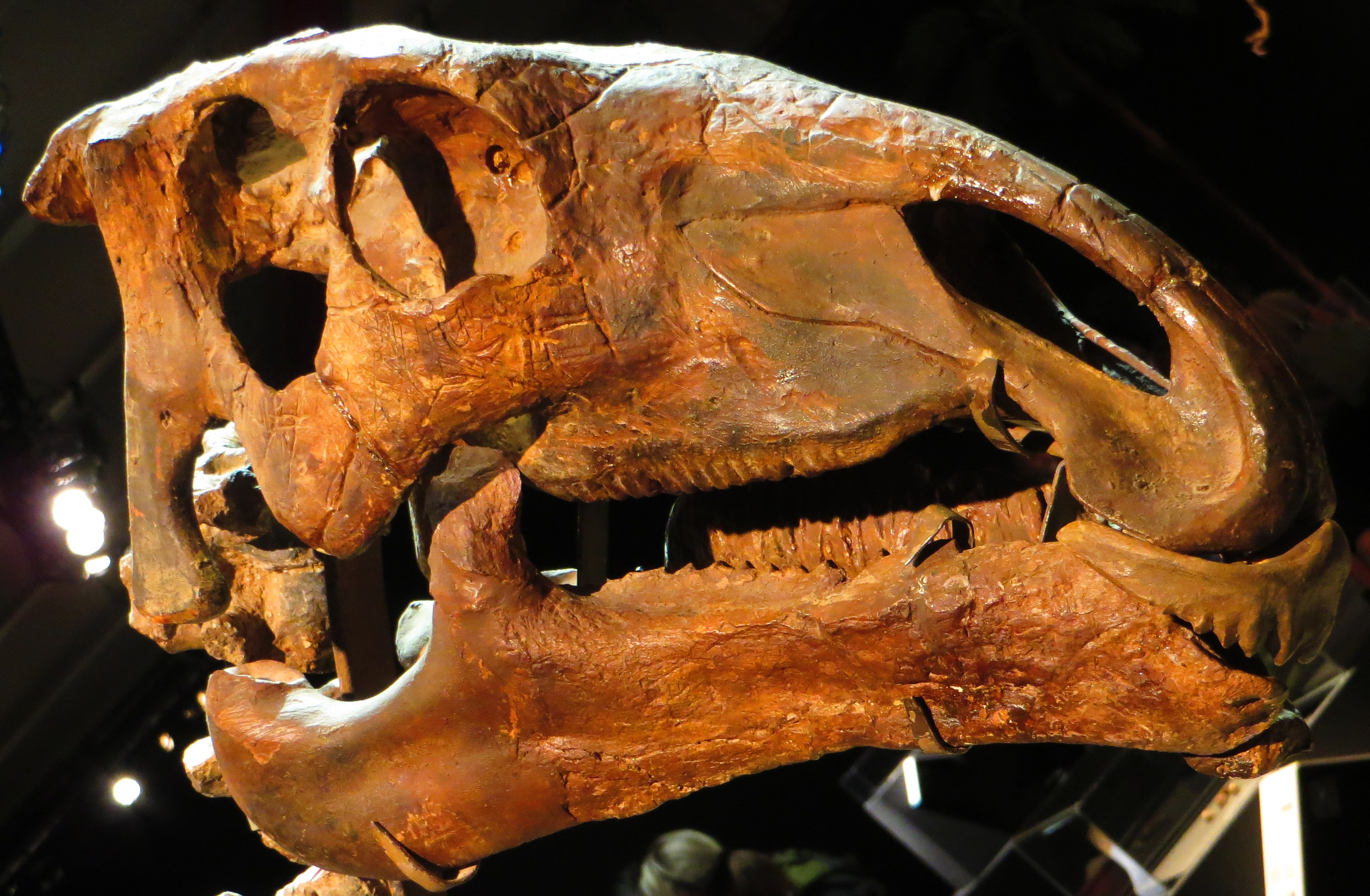
Skull of Probactrosaurus, the closest relative of Eolambia according to Head

In 2001, Jason Head re-evaluated the phylogenetic position of Eolambia based on specimens stored at the OMNH. He recognized Kirkland's identification of supposed lambeosaurine distinguishing traits in Eolambia as either erroneous or dubious. As demonstrated by Head, there is actually a foramen on the premaxilla; the premaxilla only borders the nostril on the bottom edge; there are two finger-like processes at the front of the maxilla in addition to the shelf; high neural spines of the caudal vertebrae also occur in the non-lambeosaurines Ouranosaurus and Bactrosaurus; and the expansion of the tip of the ischium also occurs in Camptosaurus, Iguanodon, Ouranosaurus, Gilmoreosaurus, and Bactrosaurus, indicating that the expansion is plesiomorphic for iguanodonts and was secondarily lost in hadrosaurines. While M.L. Casanovas and colleagues in 1999 characterized lambeosaurines as having an "expanded foot" at the tip of the ischium, as opposed to a "club-like" condition, Head argued that Corythosaurus and Lambeosaurus have ischial tips no more expanded than those of Mantellisaurus or Ouranosaurus.

Head also demonstrated that the teeth of Eolambia were broader and more asymmetrical than Kirkland had assumed; he also noted that subadults only possessed two teeth per tooth position, unlike hadrosaurids, although adult specimens in fact have the three or more tooth positions as originally demonstrated by Kirkland. Head further showed that Eolambia possessed seven sacral vertebrae, unlike eight or more in derived hadrosaurids, and that its antitrochanter was actually more poorly developed than those of Ouranosaurus and Altirhinus. Examination of the OMNH specimens further demonstrated that the postacetabular region of the ilium did not form a distinct process, and the articulations at the bottom of the femur are not very prominent, both of which separate Eolambia from more derived iguanodonts such as hadrosaurids. Thus, Head concluded that Eolambia was a basal member of the Hadrosauroidea, outside of the Hadrosauridae, a conclusion supported by a phylogenetic analysis finding it to be a non-hadrosaurid hadrosauroid closely related to Probactrosaurus.

=== Subsequent research ===
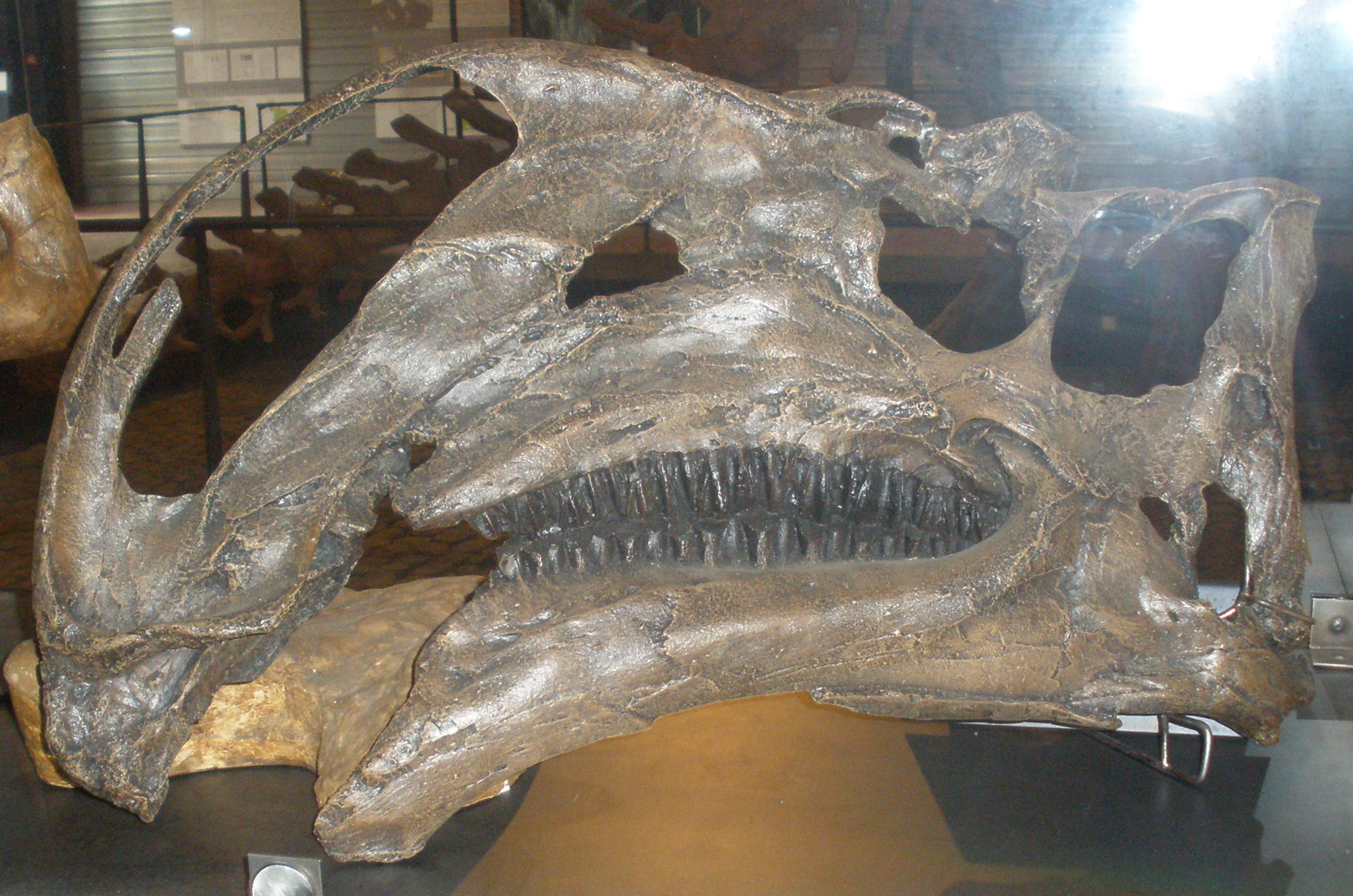
Skull of Altirhinus, considered by Norman as the sister group of Eolambia but now known to be more basal

In 2004, Norman included Eolambia for the first time in a comprehensive phylogenetic analysis of iguanodonts, as part of a chapter focusing on iguanodonts in the second edition of The Dinosauria. He found that Eolambia was the sister group to Altirhinus, with both of them being more basal than Protohadros, Probactrosaurus, or the Hadrosauridae. Within the same volume, Horner, Weishampel, and Catherine Forster conducted a separate phylogenetic analysis of hadrosaurids, likewise including Eolambia. They found Eolambia again as a non-hadrosaurid hadrosauroid, albeit as the sister group to Protohadros. Although Head had specifically redefined the Hadrosauridae, based on shared characteristics, to include Protohadros, Horner and colleagues adapted a taxon-based definition that excluded Protohadros and thus Eolambia. They also identified additional characteristics differentiating Eolambia from hadrosaurids: there are coarse denticles on the teeth of the dentary, and the coronoid process is weakly expanded.

Variance in recovered phylogenetic positions for Eolambia persisted in the following years. In the 2009 description of Levnesovia, Hans-Dieter Sues and Alexander Averianov found that Protohadros occupied an intermediate position relative to Altirhinus and Probactrosaurus, being the sister group of Fukuisaurus. Meanwhile, in accordance with the results of Horner and colleagues, Albert Prieto-Márquez and Mark Norell found in 2010 that Eolambia was instead the sister group of Protohadros. He also noted features of Eolambia that were convergent upon hadrosaurids: the presence of a single tooth carina; the nearly-square outer corner of the predentary; and the midpoint of the quadratojugal notch (which articulates with the quadratojugal) being located roughly halfway up the surface of the quadrate (being located less than 60% of the bone's height down from the top). In 2012, Holtz classified Eolambia as a primitive member of the Styracosterna along with Altirhinus.

In 2012, McDonald conducted a phylogenetic analysis of iguanodonts incorporating data from new Eolambia specimens. Contrary to previous authors, he found instead that Eolambia was the sister group of Probactrosaurus. This close relationship was based on two shared characteristics: the quadrate being straight save for the top end, which is curved backwards; and the top and bottom margins of the scapular blade being nearly parallel. Wenjie Zheng and colleagues added Jintasaurus to the group in 2014, while José Gasca and colleagues recovered the original group in 2015. However, McDonald extensively revised his phylogenetic dataset further in preparation for the 2017 description of the FMNH specimens. As with Horner and colleagues, as well as Prieto-Márquez and Norell, McDonald and colleagues found that Eolambia was the sister group of Protohadros, with both of them being placed as basal hadrosauromorphs (results reproduced below). Using the 2012 version of the McDonald dataset, Francisco Verdú and colleagues independently recovered a similar result, with Eolambia being closely related to Protohadros and Jeyawati; however, McDonald and colleagues found the latter to be more derived in 2017.

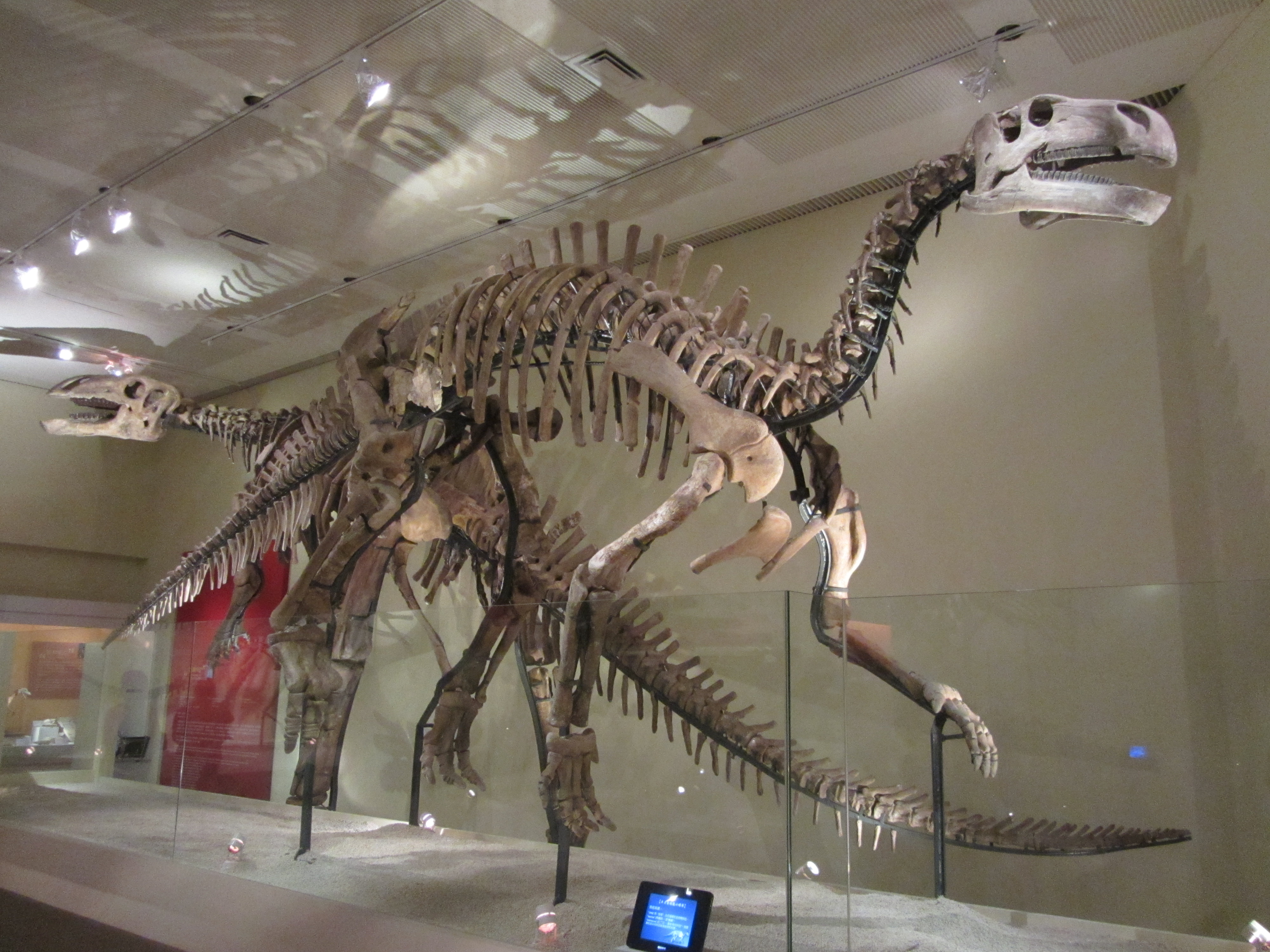
Reconstruction of Jintasaurus, recovered by Zheng et al. as a sister group of Eolambia

- Hadrosauriformes
  - Iguanodon
  - Hadrosauroidea
    - Mantellisaurus
    - - - Ouranosaurus
        - - Altirhinus
          - - Morelladon
            - Proa
            - Batyrosaurus
            - - Sirindhorna
              - Koshisaurus
      - - - Jinzhousaurus
          - Bolong
        - - - Equijubus
            - Xuwulong
          - - Gongpoquansaurus
            - - Probactrosaurus
              - Hadrosauromorpha
                - Jintasaurus
                - - Eolambia
                  - Protohadros
                - - Jeyawati
                  - - Nanningosaurus
                    - - Nanyangosaurus
                      - - Yunganglong
                        - - Gilmoreosaurus
                          - Levnesovia
                          - - Bactrosaurus
                            - - Tanius
                              - - Huehuecanauhtlus
                                - - Zhanghenglong
                                  - - Plesiohadros
                                    - Shuangmiaosaurus
                                - - - Telmatosaurus
                                    - Tethyshadros
                                  - - Claosaurus
                                    - Hadrosauridae

In 2018, Terry Gates and colleagues described the new iguanodontian genus Choyrodon, from the same locality as Altirhinus, considered in the past a relative of Eolambia. Their phylogenetic analysis, based on the matrix of Norman (2015), found Choyrodon to be the sister taxon of Eolambia. Eolambia's commonly recovered relative Protohadros was not present in this matrix. Three characteristics supported this sister relationship: a trapezoidally-shaped occiput, and two shared traits of the teeth. The placement of these genera relative to other hadrosauriformes depended on whether the antorbital fenestra was coded as present or absent in Choyrodon; the juvenile type specimen has one, but the possibility that adults would have a closed one could not be ruled out.

== Paleobiology ==
Eggshells possibly belonging to Eolambia have been discovered at various localities alongside isolated teeth. They have reticular (net-like) surface patterns, and have a thickness of 2 millimeters (0.079 in).

=== Growth ===
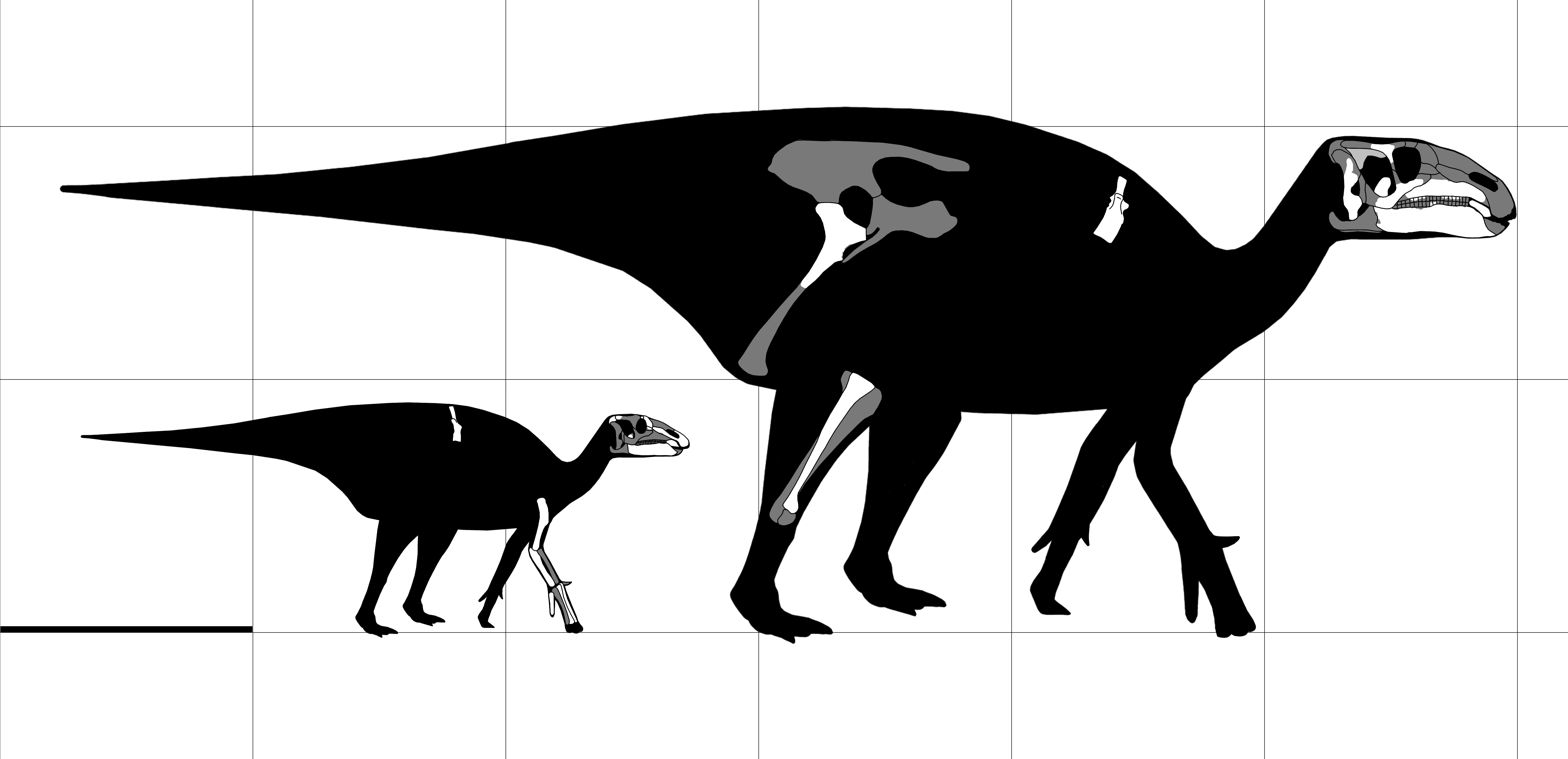
Skeletal diagram comparing the known material of the holotype adult (right) and a juvenile individual (left)

Being known from a variety of juvenile and adult specimens, the changes Eolambia underwent as it grew are well-documented. The number of teeth in the maxilla increased with age, from 23 in a juvenile to 33 in an adult. A similar increase occurred in the dentary teeth, from 18–22 in juveniles to 25–30 in adults. While juveniles lack secondary ridges on the crowns of their dentary teeth, faint secondary ridges are present in adults. The size of the "boot" of the ischium also increased with age, as documented by Kirkland. Changes may also have occurred in the straightness of the shaft of the ischium, as documented by specimens discovered by the FMNH.

Results from a histological analysis performed on a rib from specimen FMNH PR 3847 were reported by McDonald and colleagues in 2017. Extensive bone remodeling has occurred in the internal matrix of the rib. The medullary cavity, which houses the marrow, is marked by the presence of many cavities, or lacunae. On the outer surface of the bone, osteons have almost completely replaced the interior of the bone; the layered growth of the bone is more visible on the interior of the bone, where five lines of arrested growth (LAGs) are visible. A sixth LAG is possibly present within the medullary region, but is relatively limited in extent, which makes this identification questionable.

Since LAGs can be obliterated by bone remodeling, this represents an underestimate of the true number of LAGs that had actually developed; McDonald and colleagues estimated three or four missing LAGs by examining the spacing between the visible LAGs. This indicates that the animal was eight to nine years old when it died. The spacing between the LAGs decreases significantly towards the outer surface, indicating that growth was slowing, but the lack of the external fundamental system (a series of tightly-spaced LAGs) indicates that growth had not yet ceased. This is consistent with the unfused sutures between the centra and neural spines in the cervical and dorsal vertebrae, and the unfused sutures between the sacral centra and their corresponding ribs. Overall, the growth rate of Eolambia appears to have been comparable to that of Hypacrosaurus and Maiasaura, which reached maturity after seven or eight years.

== Paleoecology ==
=== Environment and taphonomy ===
Sedimentological data from the Mussentuchit Member indicates that Eolambia lived on a poorly-drained floodplain, around a system of large, perennial lakes. The lakes fluctuated between high and low water levels in Milankovitch cycles of roughly 21,000 years, caused by the Earth's axial precession. These cycles is reflected by the alternating layers of muddy sandstone and mudstone in present-day rock deposits. During dry periods, the exposed lakebed formed a broad beach devoid of plants. The cracked mud of the lakebed produced mud clasts, while organic debris and scavenged carcasses were scattered around the water's edge as the lake progressively retreated. Meanwhile, during periods in which the sea level rose, small rivers invaded the floodplain, which reworked and displaced the debris that had been deposited during the dry season.

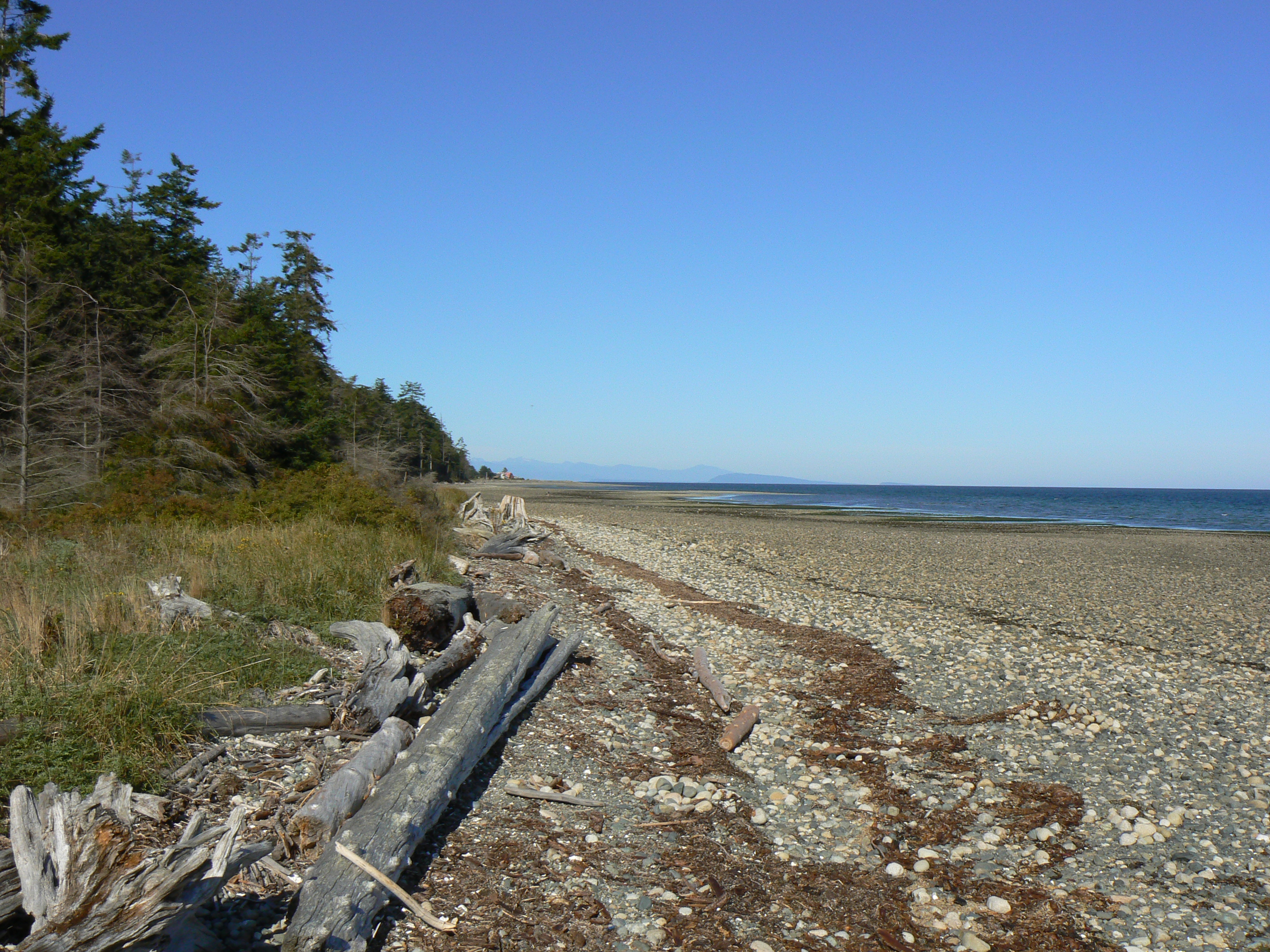
Shoreline debris at the present-day Rathtrevor Beach Provincial Park

Most of the fossils discovered in the Mussentuchit are scattered and disarticulated, with intact skeletons being relatively rare. Although the lakes did not actively destroy bones, it was not particularly conducive to good preservation either due to the long duration of the burial process. Before burial, scavengers could have disrupted the skeletal material, which is evident in the severed Eolambia tibiae bearing tooth marks discovered in the Cifelli #2 quarry. The regression of the lake could have occasionally created bogs, but they would not have been permanent enough to entrap and preserve larger vertebrates. Action by water currents seems to have played a role in the deposition of Eolambia bones in the Cifelli #2 quarry, where the bones are largely deposited at 28°, 69°, 93°, 131° and 161° azimuth (i.e. relative to north). These directions would have been parallel or sub-parallel to the edges of the lake, indicating orientation by lake currents, except for the 69° and 93° azimuths, which probably represent river currents.

The abundant plant debris, combined with the absence of sink (playa) deposits, indicates that the local climate was relatively humid during the deposition of the Mussentuchit. This is in marked contrast to earlier deposits in the area, which are calcareous (chalky), indicating periods of aridity lasting up to 10,000 years. Paleoclimatic reconstructions support these interpretations, with the encroachment of the Mowry Sea from the north (a process which would eventually form the Western Interior Seaway) resulting in arid (Mid-latitude Continental Interior) climates being replaced by more humid (Mid-latitude East Coast) climates. With a paleolatitude of 46° N, the Mussentuchit would have had a warm mean surface temperature of 40–45 °C (104–113 °F), about 6–8 °C (43–46 °F) warmer than the present day, according to general circulation models.

=== Ecosystem ===
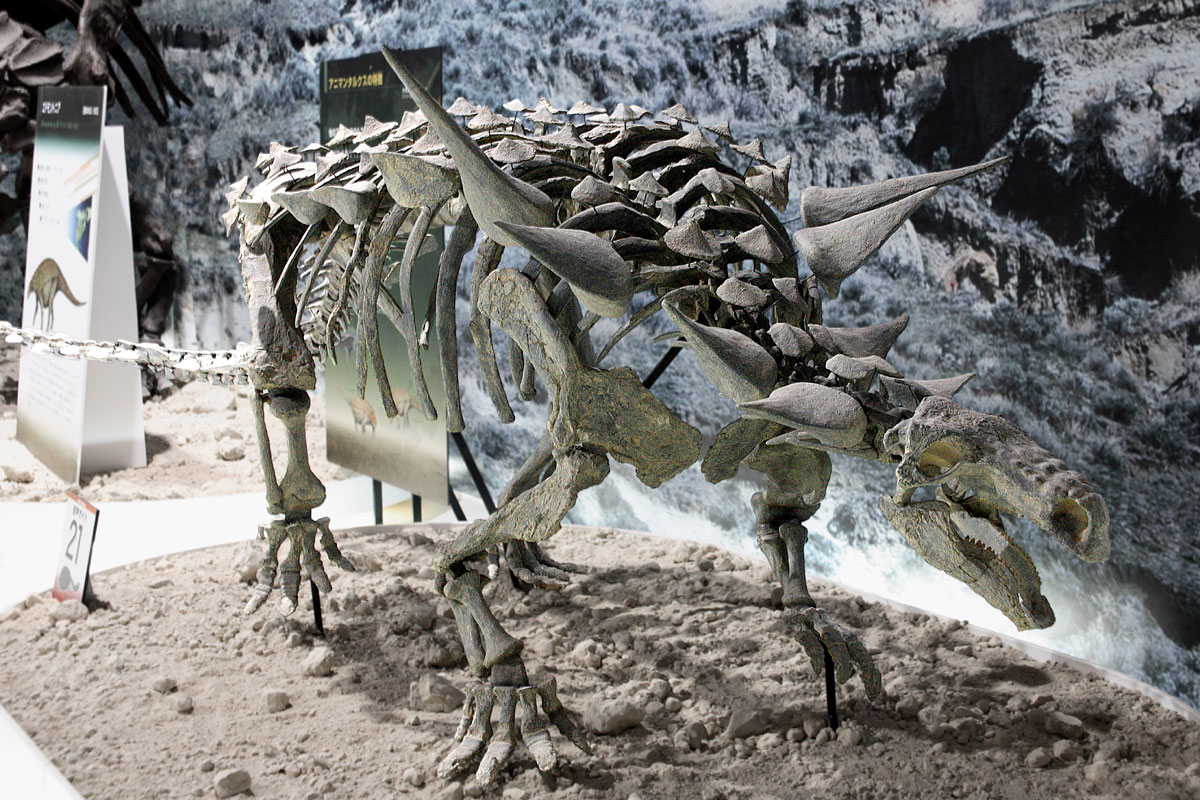
Skeleton of the co-existing nodosaurid Animantarx

Crocodylomorphs are abundant in the Mussentuchit deposits, being represented largely by teeth. The largest known teeth have been referred to the Pholidosauridae; (Note: Given that these classifications are based solely upon teeth, they are unreliable. McDonald and colleagues elected to recognize these morphotypes as indeterminate neosuchians in 2017.) they are broad with rounded bases, and some of them bear longitudinal ridges. These large crocodilians would have been capable of preying upon at least juvenile Eolambia at the water's edge. The abundance of juvenile Eolambia specimens in the lakeside fossil material supports this hypothesis; larger Eolambia would have been invulnerable to crocodilians. Smaller crocodilian teeth are also present, with two distinct morphotypes: an ovoid form bearing ridges, which has been referred to two different species of Bernissartia; and a compressed, triangular form bearing heavy ornamentation, which has been attributed to the Atoposauridae. However, given the uniform small size of these teeth, and the co-occurrence of these morphotypes in some crocodilians, they may belong to the same species.

Larger Eolambia would have been vulnerable to the large neovenatorid theropod Siats, which was discovered by expeditions from the FMNH. A variety of smaller maniraptoran theropods are also present in the Mussentuchit, which would have functioned as scavengers; their remains include teeth attributed to the Dromaeosauridae, Paronychodon, and Richardoestesia. As for herbivorous dinosaurs, the nodosaurid Animantarx was discovered in Carol's Site, near the type specimen of Eolambia. Teeth belonging to more basal ornithopods have also been discovered, with similar teeth having been referred to the Pachycephalosauria or to toothed birds by Cifelli in 1999. More complete remains referred to two different ornithopods – an orodromine and a basal iguanodont – remain unpublished. A giant oviraptorosaur has also been discovered, alongside teeth from ceratopsians and sauropods.

Fish, which may have been preyed upon by smaller crocodilians, are represented by teeth and scales. They include a myliobatiform ray referred to the genus Baibisha; an indeterminate member of the Neopterygii; a semionotid referred to the genus Lepidotes; a gar related to Atractosteus; a pycnodontid referred to the genus Stephanodus; and an indeterminate bowfin. Indeterminate caudatans (salamanders) and mammals are also present. As for plants, pollen samples indicate a tiered forest surrounding the lakes of the Mussentuchit, containing a canopy of tree ferns, araucarias, and conifers, accompanying an undergrowth of ferns, small gymnosperms, and flowering plants. Algae would also have been present in the waters of the lakes. These plants would have provided an abundant source of food for Eolambia.

=== Paleobiogeography ===
Kirkland, Cifelli, and colleagues noted that the fauna of the Mussentuchit – iguanodonts, pachycephalosaurs, and ceratopsians – bears strong similarities to contemporary Asian faunas. They proposed that Eolambia was part of an influx of Asian dinosaurs into North America during the Cenomanian, which supplanted the earlier low-diversity native fauna. This hypothesis is supported by the close relationship between Eolambia and either Probactrosaurus or Fukuisaurus, which have respectively been recovered by the phylogenies of Head and Sues & Averianov.

However, the results of Horner and colleagues, Prieto-Márquez, and McDonald and colleagues, which consider the North American Protohadros to be the closest relative of Eolambia, contradict this hypothesis. This alternative interpretation suggests that the common ancestor of Eolambia, Protohadros, and more derived hadrosauroids was not exclusively Asian, but instead distributed across Asia and North America. McDonald and colleagues further suggested that Eolambia and Protohadros represent a localized group of hadrosauroids endemic to North America, much like other groups of styracosternans throughout the Cretaceous. Such contemporary groups included a central Asian group of Shuangmiaosaurus, Zhanghenglong, and Plesiohadros.
