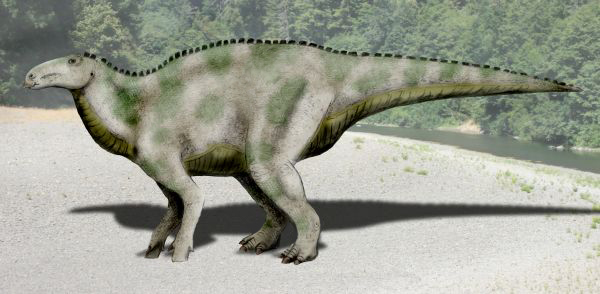
- Life restoration

Scientific classification
- Kingdom: Animalia
- Phylum: Chordata
- Class: Reptilia
- Clade: Dinosauria
- Clade: †Ornithischia
- Clade: †Ornithopoda
- Superfamily: †Hadrosauroidea
- Genus: †Jeyawati; McDonald, Wolfe & Kirkland, 2010

Type species
- †Jeyawati rugoculus McDonald, Wolfe & Kirkland, 2010

= Jeyawati =

Jeyawati Temporal range: Late Cretaceous (Turonian–Coniacian), 90.9–88.6 Ma

Genus of ornithopod dinosaur

Jeyawati (meaning "grinding mouth" in the Zuni language) is an extinct genus of hadrosauroid dinosaur which lived during the Turonian stage of the Late Cretaceous. The type species, J. rugoculus, was described in 2010, based on fossils recovered in the U.S. state of New Mexico. The holotype, MSM P4166, was discovered in the Moreno Hill Formation.

== Discovery ==
The fossil remains of Jeyawati rugoculus were discovered in 1996 in western New Mexico, in rocks of the Moreno Hill Formation. The partial skull and associated postcranial fragments were discovered by paleontologist Douglas G. Wolfe, his wife Hazel Wolfe, and their son Christopher Wolfe during work associated with the Zuni Basin Paleontological Project. Following the discovery, excavation and collection of the specimen continued for approximately 13 years, with contributions from James I. Kirkland, volunteers of the Southwest Paleontological Society, and other participants. The fossils were subsequently prepared and deposited at the Arizona Museum of Natural History.

The specimen was later studied by Andrew T. McDonald, who began examining the material as a student and determined that it represented a previously unknown species. The new genus and species, Jeyawati rugoculus, was formally described by McDonald, Wolfe and Kirkland in 2010 in the Journal of Vertebrate Paleontology.

== Classification ==
A cladistic analysis indicates that Jeyawati was more plesiomorphic (ancestral) than Shuangmiaosaurus, Telmatosaurus, and Bactrosaurus, but more derived (less like the common ancestor) than Eolambia, Probactrosaurus, and Protohadros.

In the description of Eotrachodon, it was placed inside a clade as a sister taxa to a smaller clade with Eolambia and Protohadros.

- - - Iguanodon bernissartensis
    - - Jinzhousaurus yangi
      - - Equijubus normani
        - - Probactrosaurus gobiensis
          - - - Jeyawati rugoculus
              - - Eolambia caroljonesa
                - Protohadros byrdi
            - - Tanius sinensis
              - - Bactrosaurus johnsoni
                - - Levnesovia transoxiana
                  - - Gilmoreosaurus mongoliensis
                    - - Telmatosaurus transsylvanicus
                      - - - Jintasaurus meniscus
                          - Lophorhothon atopus
                        - - Claosaurus agilis
                          - - Tethyshadros insularis
                            - Hadrosauridae
                              - Hadrosaurus foulkii
                              - - Eotrachodon orientalis
                                - Saurolophidae(=Euhadrosauria)
                                  - Saurolophinae
                                  - Lambeosaurinae

== Description ==
Jeyawati is a basal hadrosauroid dinosaur known from an incomplete skeleton, including disarticulated skull elements and fragmentary postcranial material. The holotype, MSM P4166, represents a subadult or adult individual. The species is distinguished by a rugose (rough) texture covering the lateral surface of the postorbital, together with a large neurovascular foramen at the base of the jugal process of the postorbital and a distinctive combination of other anatomical characters.

The skull preserves elements including parts of the premaxilla, maxilla, prefrontal, postfrontal, quadrate, predentary and dentary. Jeyawati possessed primitive features of the teeth and jaws while showing characteristics associated with the hadrosauroid lineage. Its name, meaning approximately “grinding mouth, wrinkle eye,” refers to its chewing adaptations and the unusual wrinkled texture of the bone surrounding the eye.

The original study's phylogenetic analysis placed Jeyawati among basal hadrosauroids, more derived than Probactrosaurus, Eolambia and Protohadros, but more basal than Shuangmiaosaurus, Bactrosaurus and Telmatosaurus.
