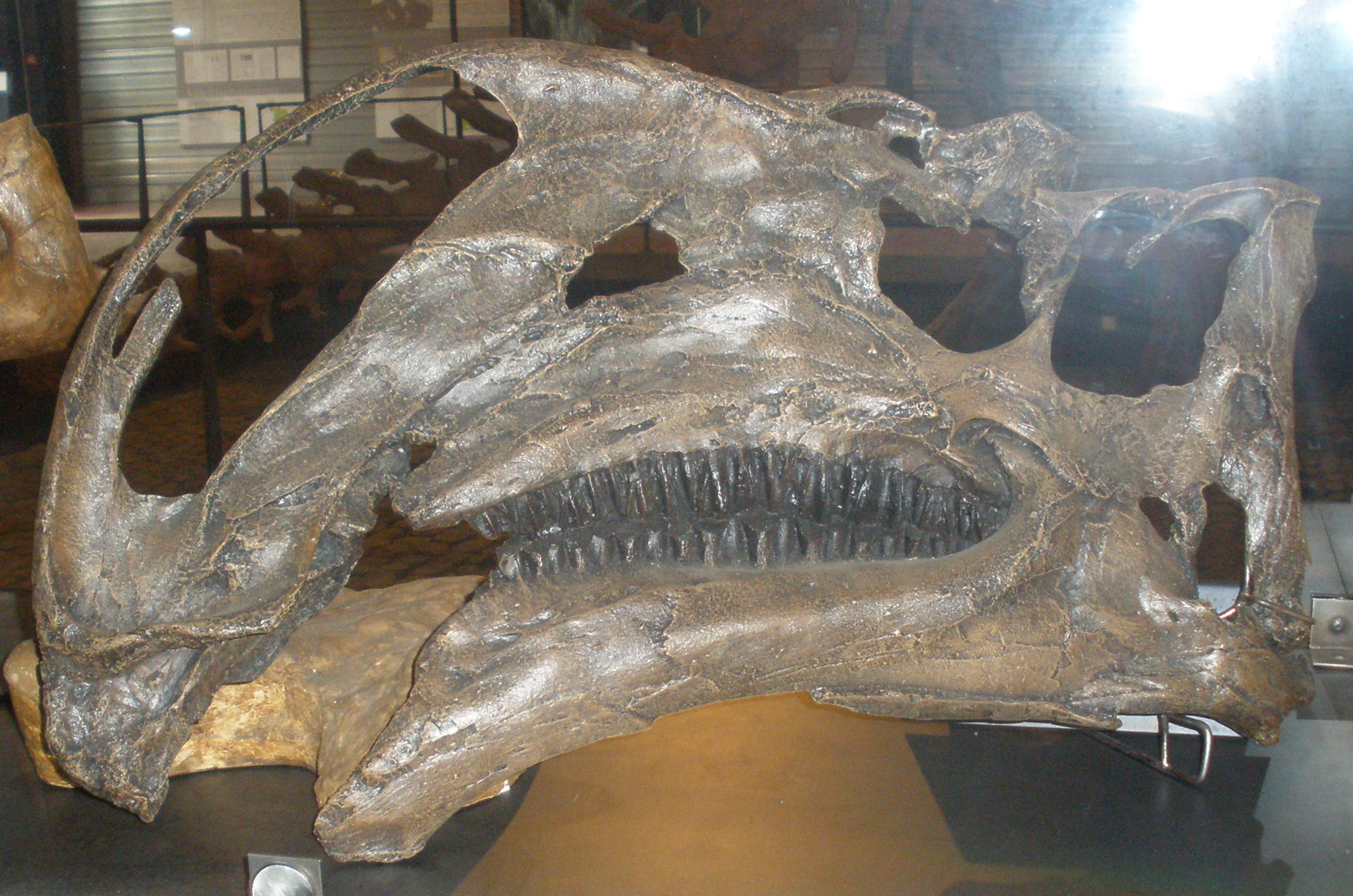
- Skull

Scientific classification
- Domain: Eukaryota
- Kingdom: Animalia
- Phylum: Chordata
- Clade: Dinosauria
- Clade: †Ornithischia
- Clade: †Ornithopoda
- Superfamily: †Hadrosauroidea
- Genus: †Altirhinus
- Species: †A. kurzanovi

Binomial name
- †Altirhinus kurzanovi Norman, 1998

= Altirhinus =

Altirhinus Temporal range: Early Cretaceous (Barremian to Albian), 125–100.5 Ma

Extinct genus of dinosaurs

Altirhinus (/ˌæltɪˈraɪnəs/; "high nose") is a genus of hadrosauroid ornithopod dinosaur from the Early Cretaceous period of Mongolia.

== History of discovery ==
All known specimens of Altirhinus were recovered in 1981 during collaborative expeditions organized by Soviet and Mongolian scientists, from the Khuren Dukh Formation in the Dornogovi Province of Mongolia. The Khukhtek was formed in the Aptian to Albian stages of the Early Cretaceous Period, which lasted from between 125 and 100.5 million years ago. Psittacosaurus and the primitive ankylosaurid Shamosaurus have also been found in these rocks.

Several fossil specimens of different ages and sizes are known. The holotype, PIN 3386/8, is a skull, which is well preserved on the left side, as well as some postcranial material consisting of pieces of the hands, feet, shoulder and pelvic girdles. A more fragmentary skull was also recovered, associated with some ribs, fragmentary vertebrae, and a complete forelimb. A third specimen preserves many limb bones and a series of 34 tail vertebrae from a smaller individual. Two even smaller fragmentary skeletons, presumably of young individuals, were uncovered nearby.

The remains of this animal were originally referred to the species Iguanodon orientalis, which was first described in 1952. However, I. orientalis has since been shown to be fragmentary, nondiagnostic, and virtually indistinguishable from the European I. bernissartensis (Norman, 1996). As no features of I. orientalis are shared exclusively with the 1981 specimens, which are clearly distinguishable from Iguanodon, a new name for those specimens was required. British paleontologist David B. Norman named them Altirhinus kurzanovi in 1998.

The name was created from a Latin word, altus ("high") and a Greek word, ῥίς, rhis, genitive rhinos ("nose" or "snout"). There is one known species (A. kurzanovi), which honors Sergei Kurzanov, the influential Russian paleontologist who originally found the specimens in 1981.

== Description ==
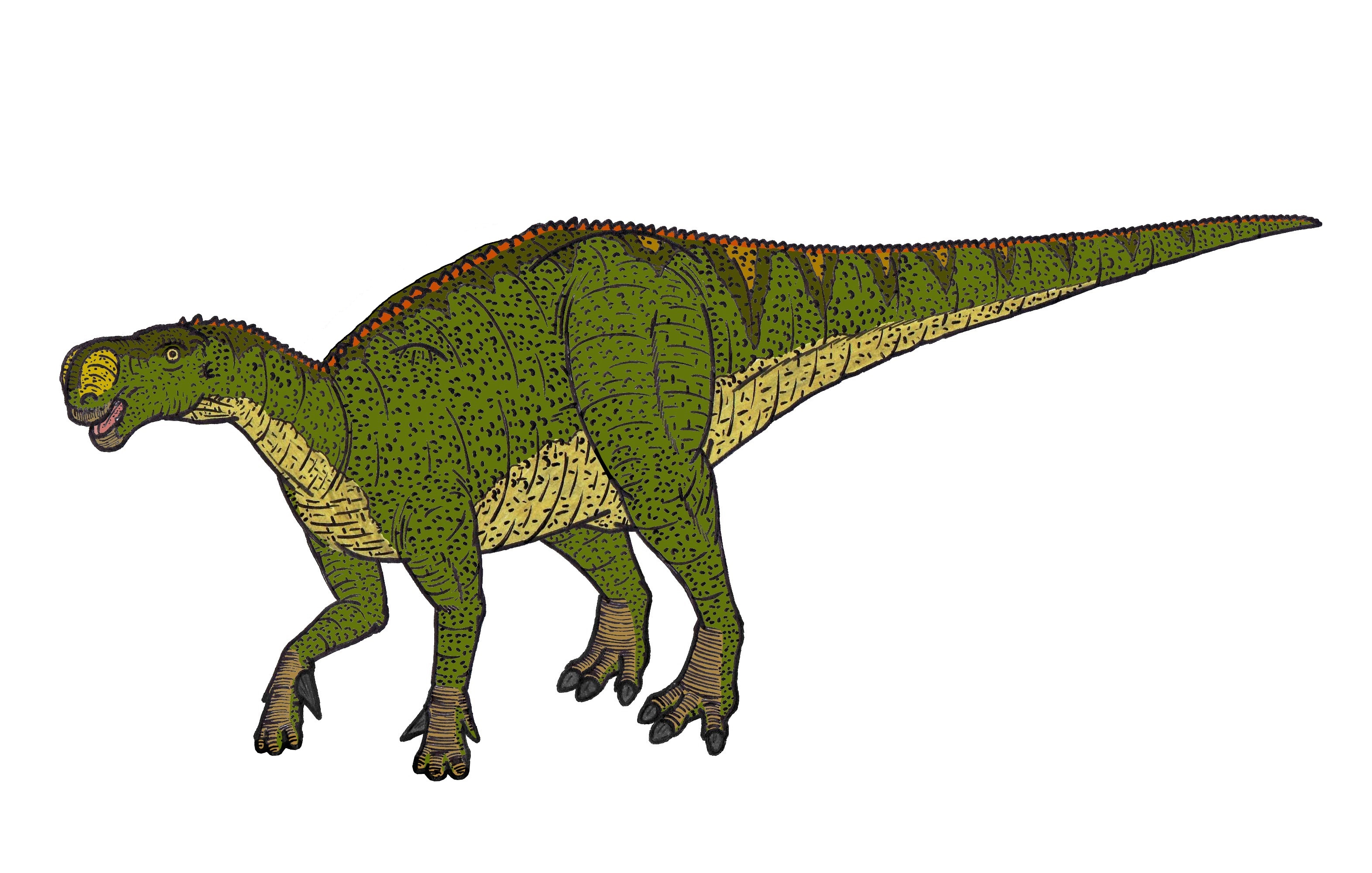
Restoration

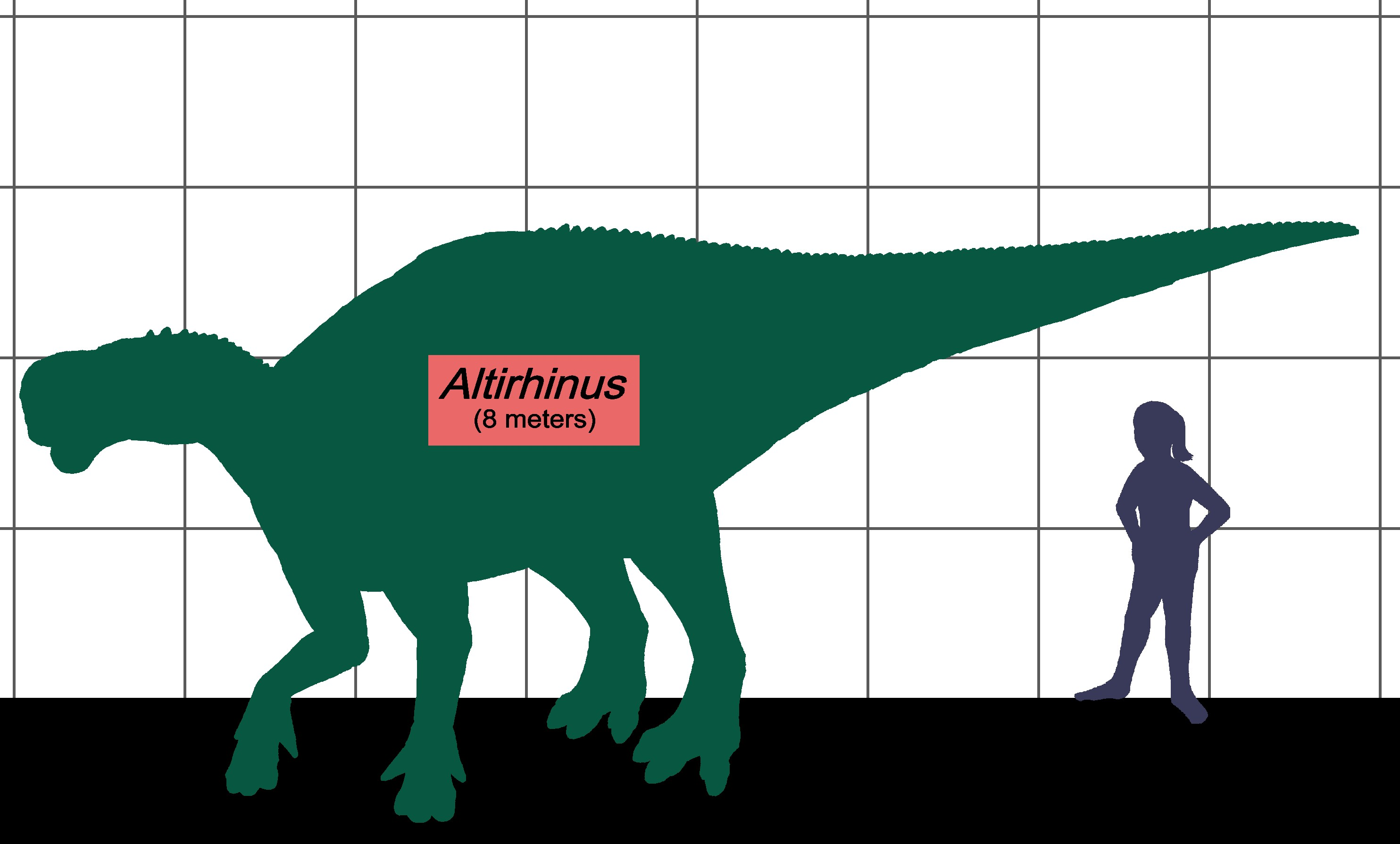
Size comparison to human

Altirhinus was herbivorous and bipedal when walking or running, but probably became quadrupedal when feeding from the ground. According to the original description, the entire body probably extended 8 meters (26 ft) from snout to tail tip. In 2010 Gregory S. Paul estimated the length at 6.5 meters (21 ft), the weight at 1.1 tonnes. The skull alone is about 760 mm long, with a wide mouth and a distinctive tall arch on top of its snout, from which this dinosaur derives its name.

== Taxonomy ==
Altirhinus is definitely an advanced iguanodontian, just basal to the family Hadrosauridae, but there is little agreement on the arrangement of genera and species in this area of the ornithopod family tree.

In the original description, it was included with Iguanodon and Ouranosaurus in a family Iguanodontidae (Norman, 1998). More recent analyses all find Altirhinus more derived than either of those two genera, but less than Protohadros, Probactrosaurus, and hadrosaurids (Head, 2001; Kobayashi & Azuma, 2003; Norman, 2004). The former two studies also place Eolambia between Altirhinus and hadrosaurids, while Norman's analysis finds that the two genera share a clade.

Fukuisaurus is just basal to Altirhinus according to the only analysis in which the former has been included (Kobayashi & Azuma, 2003).

== Paleobiology ==
Many aspects of Altirhinus' anatomy allow speculation on its behavior.

=== Locomotion ===
As its forelimbs were roughly half the length of its hindlimbs, Altirhinus appears to have been primarily bipedal. However, its carpals (wrist bones) were thick and blocky, and the three middle fingers of its hand were wide, hyperextendable, and ended in hoof-like bones. This indicates that the forelimbs were also capable of supporting weight. Like many ornithopods, Altirhinus may have spent a significant amount of time in a quadrupedal position, perhaps while feeding.

=== Feeding ===
While the three middle digits of each forelimb (digits II, III, & IV) were very thick and probably weight bearing, the outside fingers (digits I & V) were modified in different ways. The first digit was a simple sharp spike, as seen in Iguanodon. Aside from defense, the thumb spike could possibly have also been used for breaking the shells of seeds or fruit. The fifth digit was somewhat opposable to the rest of the hand and may have been useful for grasping food.

There is a large diastema, or gap, between the keratinous beak on the front of the mouth and the main chewing teeth in the side of the mouth, which would allow the two sections to work independently, so Altirhinus could crop with its beak while simultaneously chewing with its teeth. Many herbivorous mammals show a similar adaptation and can crop with their incisors without disturbing their chewing molars.

Altirhinus was one of a number of advanced iguanodontians with snouts expanded outwards towards the end. This is quite possibly an example of convergent evolution with hadrosaurids, famous for their wide "duckbill" snouts. These adaptations are also paralleled in many living mammalian herbivores of different lineages. Modern cows, horses, and white rhinoceros all exhibit wide muzzles and all are grazing animals. Grazing most often occurs at ground level, and if the expanded muzzles of Altirhinus and other related species were an adaptation to grazing, this may also explain corresponding weight-bearing adaptations of the forelimbs in derived iguanodontians, in order to get the head closer to the ground.

=== Nasal arch ===
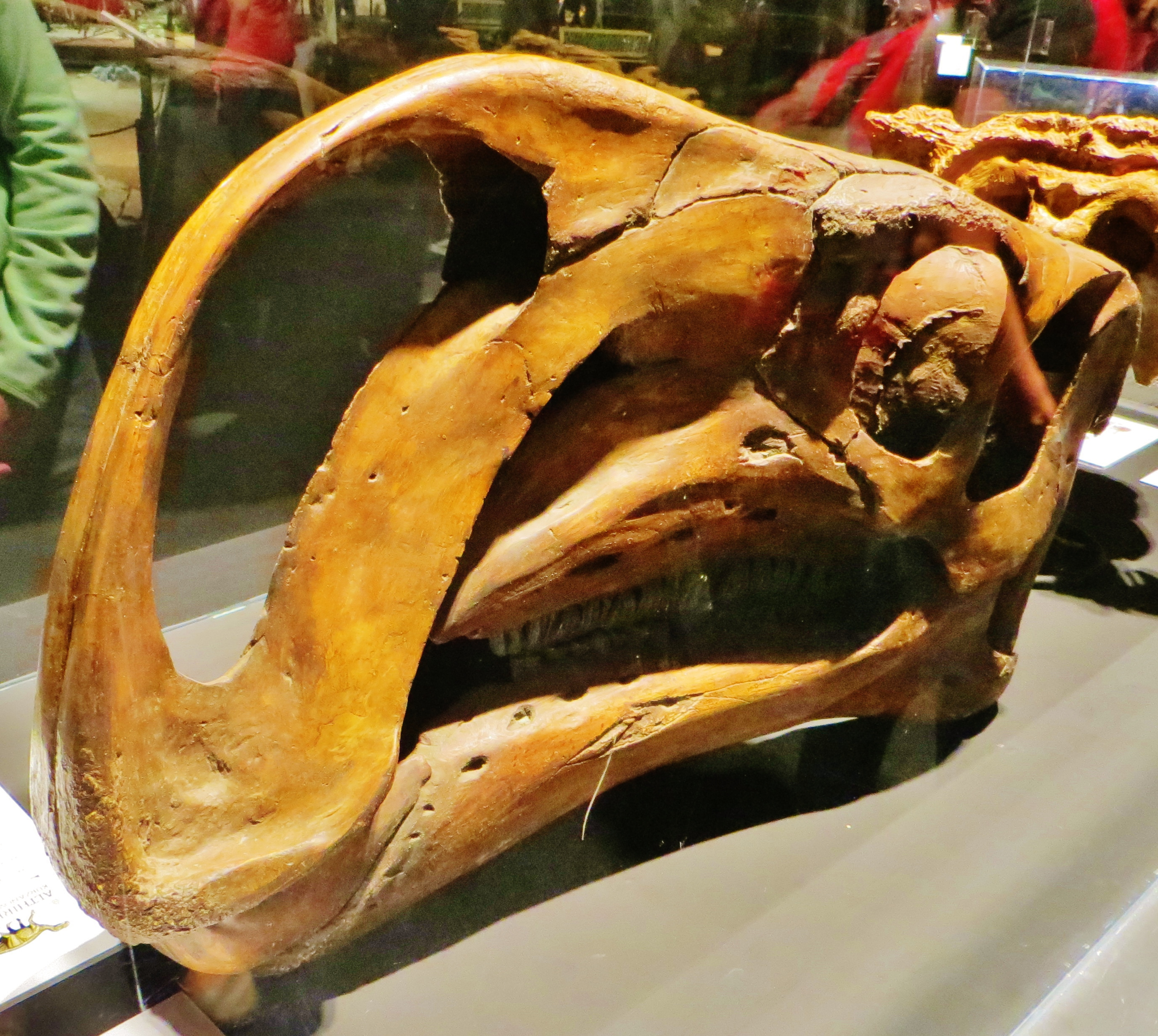
Skull cast

The characteristic arched snout of Altirhinus was formed primarily by the nasal bones, and a similar structure is seen on the snout of the Australian Muttaburrasaurus. Many different functions have been proposed for the nasal arch. It may have housed tissues to cool the blood, conserve water, or enhance the sense of smell. Alternatively, it may have facilitated communication through vocalization or visual display. As only two skulls have been located, it is entirely possible that the arched snout is only found in one sex, in which case it may have been used for sexual display, like in modern-day elephant seals.

== Sources ==
- Head, J.J. 2001. A reanalysis of the phylogenetic position of Eolambia caroljonesa. Journal of Vertebrate Paleontology. 21(2): 392–396.
- Kobayashi, Y. & Y. Azuma (2003). "A new iguanodontian (Dinosauria: Ornithopoda) from the Lower Cretaceous Kitadani Formation of Fukui Prefecture, Japan". Journal of Vertebrate Paleontology. 23(1): 392–396.
- Norman, D.B. 1996. On Asian ornithopods (Dinosauria, Ornithischia). 1. Iguanodon orientalis Rozhdestvensky, 1952. Zoological Journal of the Linnean Society. 116: 303–315.
- Norman, D.B. 1998. On Asian ornithopods (Dinosauria, Ornithischia). 3. A new species of iguanodontid dinosaur. Zoological Journal of the Linnean Society. 122: 291–348.
- Norman, D.B. 2004. Basal Iguanodontia. In: Weishampel, D.A., Dodson, P. & Osmolska, H. (Eds.). The Dinosauria (2nd Edition). Berkeley: University of California Press. Pp. 413–437.
- Rozhdestvensky, A.K. 1952. [Discovery of iguanodonts in Mongolia.] Doklady Akademii Nauk SSSR. 84(6): 1243–1246. [in Russian]
