= Shuangmiaosaurus =

Shuangmiaosaurus Temporal range: Cenomanian, 100 Ma

Scientific classification
- Kingdom: Animalia
- Phylum: Chordata
- Class: Reptilia
- Clade: Dinosauria
- Clade: †Ornithischia
- Clade: †Ornithopoda
- Clade: †Styracosterna
- Genus: †Shuangmiaosaurus; You et al., 2003
- Species: †S. gilmorei

Binomial name
- †Shuangmiaosaurus gilmorei You et al., 2003

Extinct genus of dinosaurs

Shuangmiaosaurus is a genus of herbivorous iguanodontian ornithopod dinosaur which lived in China during the Late Cretaceous Period, about 100 million years ago.

The type species, Shuangmiaosaurus gilmorei, was named and described by You Hailu, Ji Qiang Li Jinglu and Li Yinxian in 2003. The generic name refers to the village of Shuangmiao in Beipiao in Liaoning Province, the site of the discovery. The specific name honours the American paleontologist Charles Whitney Gilmore.

The holotype, specimen LPM 0165, was found in the Sunjiawan Formation dating to the Late Cretaceous (Cenomanian). It consists of a partial left upper jaw and lower jaw, including the maxilla, part of the premaxilla, elements of the lacrimal and the dentary. It was a rather large ornithopod, estimated at 7.5 metres (25 ft) in length and 2.5 tonnes (2.5 long tons; 2.8 short tons) in body mass.

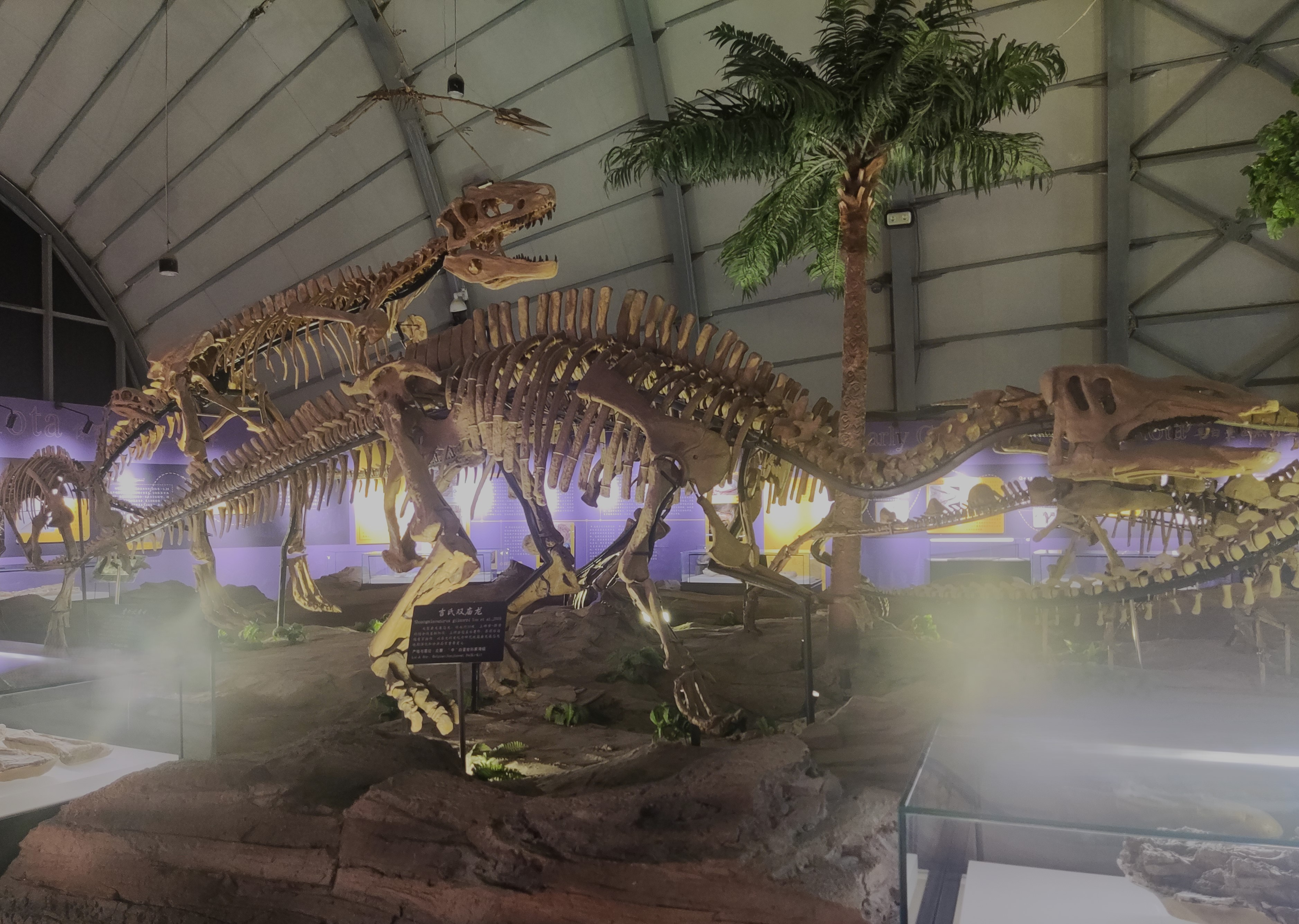
Reconstructed skeleton depicting it as a hadrosaur, Liaoning Palaeontological Museum

Shuangmiaosaurus was originally considered a basal member of the Hadrosauroidea, one closely related to the Hadrosauridae. Subsequent authors, including David B. Norman of Cambridge University, consider it a more basal member of the Iguanodontia outside of the Hadrosauroidea.
