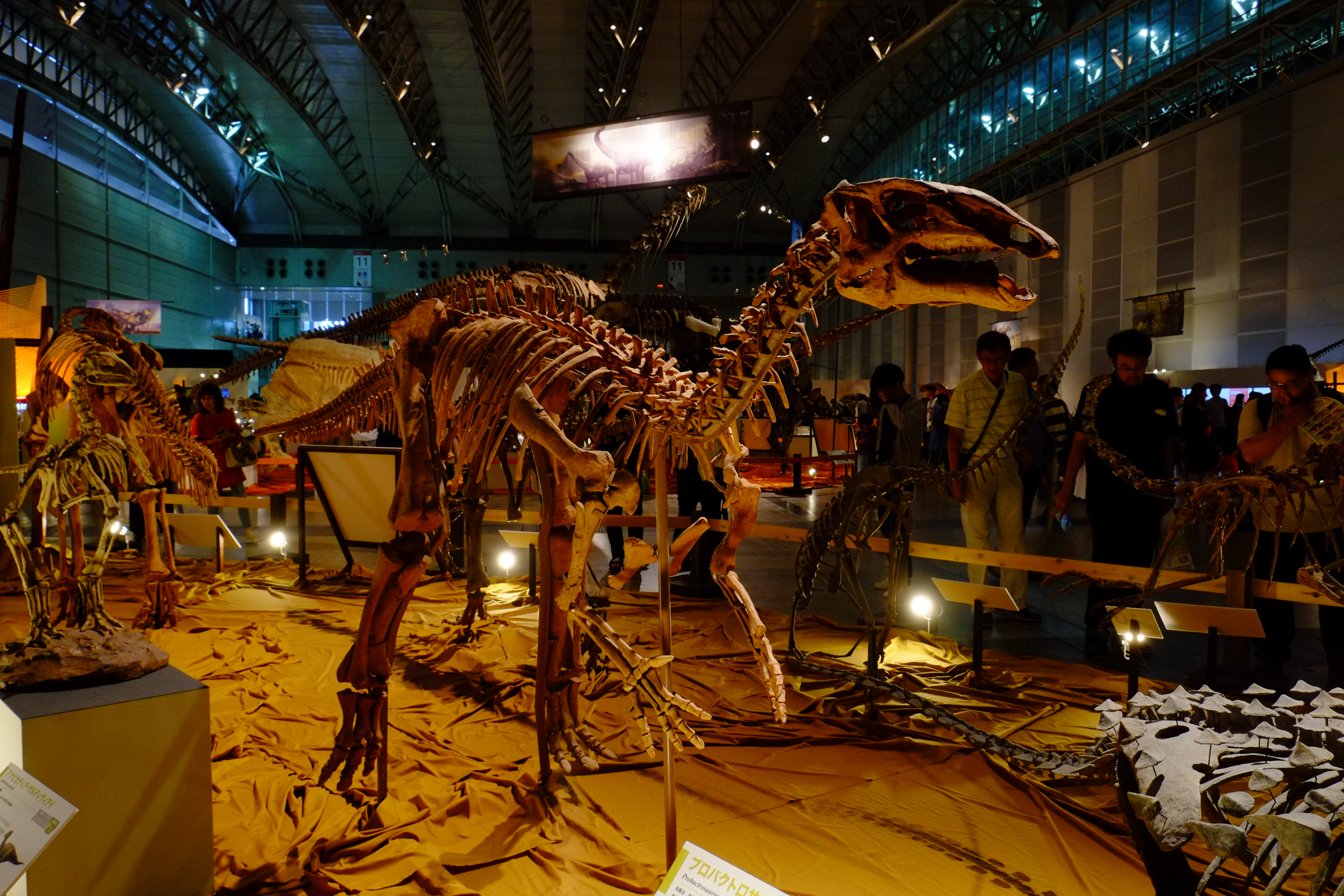
- Complete skeleton mounted at the Giga Dinosaur Exhibition 2017

Scientific classification
- Kingdom: Animalia
- Phylum: Chordata
- Class: Reptilia
- Clade: Dinosauria
- Clade: †Ornithischia
- Clade: †Ornithopoda
- Superfamily: †Hadrosauroidea
- Genus: †Probactrosaurus; Rozhdestvensky, 1966

Type species
- †Probactrosaurus gobiensis Rozhdestvensky, 1966

Synonyms
- Probactrosaurus alashanicus Rozhdestvensky, 1966

= Probactrosaurus =

Probactrosaurus Temporal range: Early Cretaceous, ~Barremian–Albian

Extinct genus of dinosaurs

Probactrosaurus (meaning "before Bactrosaurus") is an extinct genus of basal hadrosauroid iguanodontian dinosaur that lived in China during the Early Cretaceous period.

== Discovery and species ==
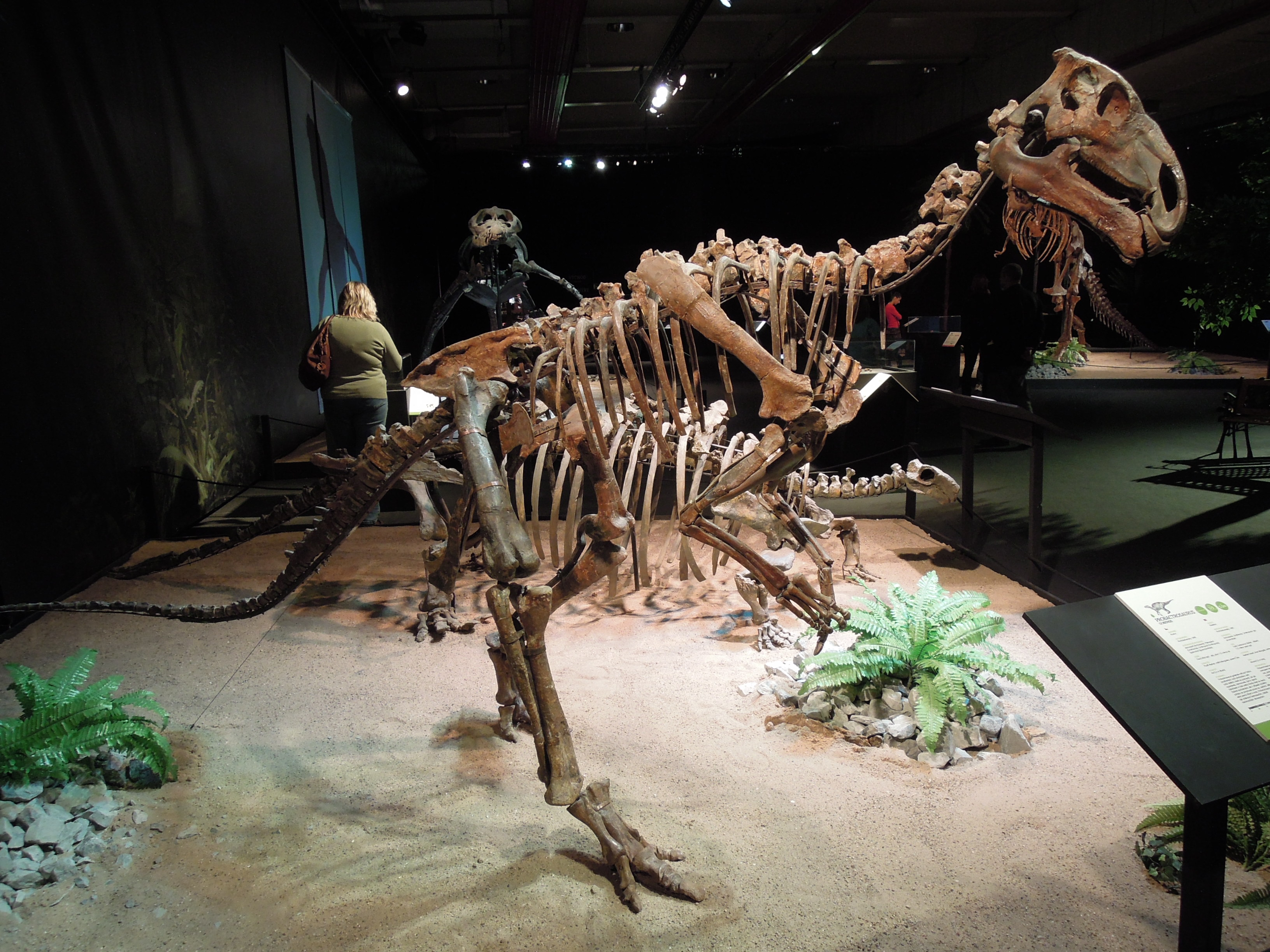
Mounted fossil

In 1959 and 1960 a Soviet-Chinese expedition uncovered the remains of a euornithopod in Inner Mongolia near Maortu. The type species is Probactrosaurus gobiensis, described and named by A. K. Rozhdestvensky in 1966. The generic name refers to Rozhdestvensky's hypothesis that Probactrosaurus would be the direct ancestor of Bactrosaurus, a notion now discarded.

The specific name refers to the Gobi Desert. The holotype specimen, PIN 2232/1, a partial skeleton with skull, was found in layers of the Miaogou Formation (Maortu locality; originally interpreted as the nearby Dashuigou Formation). Another partial skeleton, PIN 2232-10, was found along with numerous other fragments.

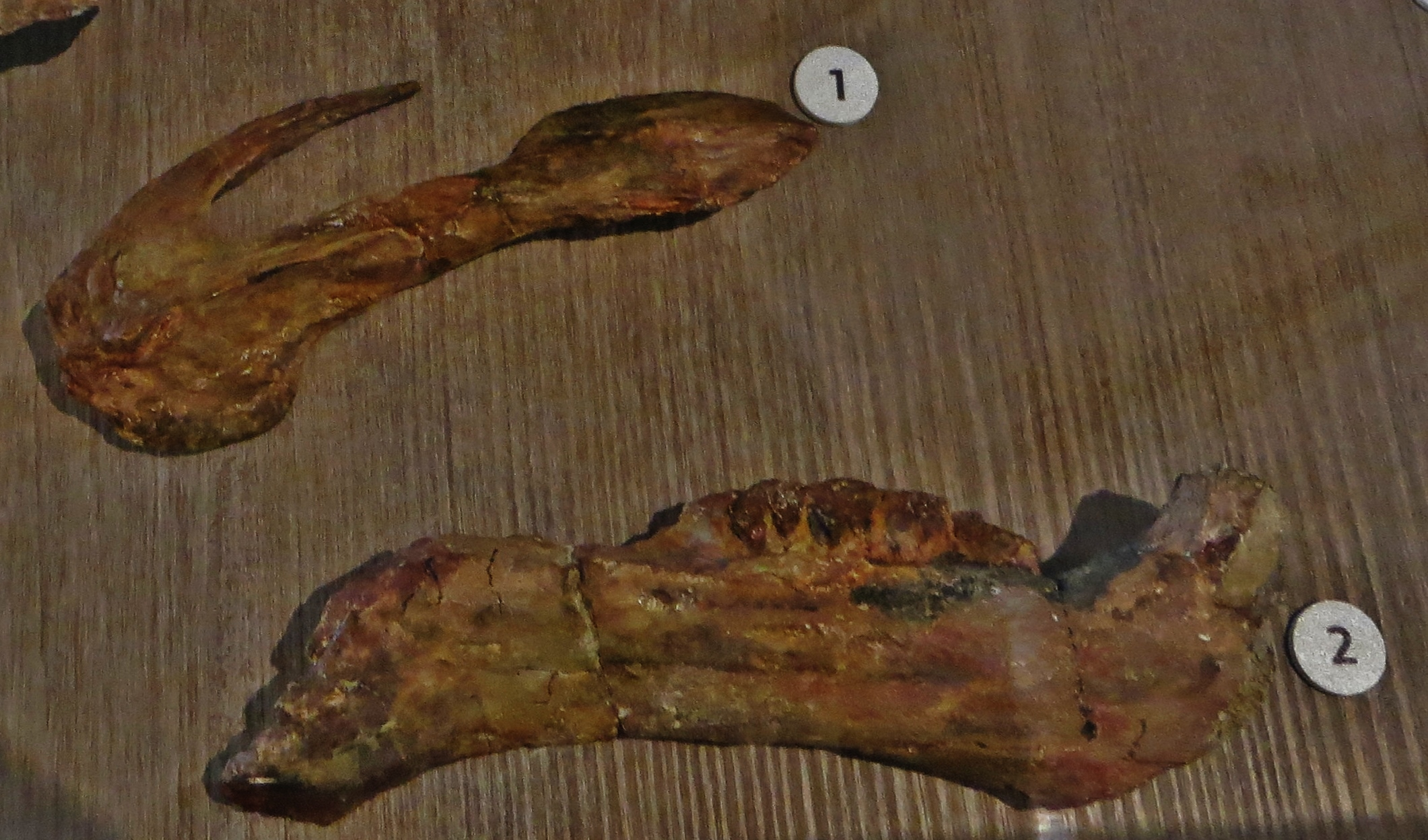
Mandible and nasal bone

In 1966 Rozhdestvensky also named a second species, Probactrosaurus alashanicus, based on fragmentary material. Its specific name refers to the Alxa League. In 2002 David B. Norman published a revision of the genus, in which he reported the holotype specimen of P. alashanicus, the back of a skull, had been lost after being dispatched from Moscow to Beijing. He concluded that the species was a synonym of P. gobiensis.

In 1997 Lü Junchang named a third species, Probactrosaurus mazongshanensis, based on holotype IVPP V.11333 found in 1992. The specific name refers to the Mazong Shan region. Today, this form is seen as more closely related to Equijubus and Altirhinus rather than to P. gobiensis and is therefore commonly referred to as "Probactrosaurus" mazongshanensis. It was moved to the new genus Gongpoquansaurus in 2014.

== Description ==
Size compared to a human

Probactrosaurus was a herbivorous dinosaur. In 2010 Gregory S. Paul estimated its length at 5.5 metres (18 feet) and its weight at one tonne. Probactrosauurus was lightly built, with relatively long and slender arms and hands and only a small thumb spike. It had a narrow snout, an elongated lower jaw and tooth batteries, each consisting of a superimposed double row of flattened cheek teeth; a third row of replacement teeth was incipient. Probably predominantly quadrupedal, it shared some common features with the later duck-billed dinosaurs.

== Classification ==
Probactrosaurus was originally assigned by Rozhdestvenky to the Iguanodontidae. Today it is seen as a basal member of the Hadrosauroidea, relatively closely related to the Hadrosauromorpha.

== See also ==
- Timeline of hadrosaur research
