= Protohadros =

Protohadros Temporal range: Late Cretaceous, Cenomanian

Scientific classification
- Kingdom: Animalia
- Phylum: Chordata
- Class: Reptilia
- Clade: Dinosauria
- Clade: †Ornithischia
- Clade: †Ornithopoda
- Superfamily: †Hadrosauroidea
- Clade: †Hadrosauromorpha
- Genus: †Protohadros; Head, 1998

Type species
- †Protohadros byrdi Head, 1998

Extinct genus of dinosaurs

Protohadros (meaning "first hadrosaur") is a genus of basal hadrosauroid dinosaur from the early Late Cretaceous (Cenomanian stage, approximately 100-93.9 million years ago) of what is now Texas, United States. It is represented by the species Protohadros byrdi, known from a partially complete skull and associated postcranial remains recovered from the Woodbine Formation. Protohadros was one of the earliest derived hadrosaurs in North America.

== History of Discovery ==
Gary Byrd, a part-time palaeontologist, discovered some remains of this euornithopod (ribs and an ungual) during early 1994 at Flower Mound, Denton County, north-central Texas. He informed professional palaeontologist Yuong-Nam Lee of the find, who arranged for the entire preserved fossil to be excavated. It was first reported upon in 1996 by Jason Head of the Dedman College of Humanities and Sciences, Southern Methodist University. The type species Protohadros byrdi was described and named by Head in 1998. The genus name is derived from Greek πρῶτος, protos, "first", en ἁδρός, hadros, "thick", a reference to the fact that Head considered the species the oldest known hadrosaur. The specific name honours Byrd.

The holotype, specimen SMU 74582, of Protohadros, was found in the Woodbine Formation, which dates to the middle Cenomanian. It consists of a partial skull, pieces of ribs, a hand ungual and a neural arch. In 1997 Lee named possible tracks of Protohadros as the ichnospecies Caririchnium protohadrosaurichnos.

This discovery also had larger implications. Before Protohadros, many researchers leaned toward an Asian origin for hadrosaurids. But the presence of such an early and basal form in North America suggested that a North American origin was just as plausible, if not equally supported.

== Description ==
Protohadros was a medium-sized ornithopod, with an estimated skull length exceeding 70 cm and a total body length likely in the range of 6–8 meters. It is diagnosed primarily by the presence of a ventrally deflected muzzle, formed by a deep and robust predentary and a rostrally expanded, downward-curving dentary. This configuration produces a strongly downturned snout, a feature not seen in other hadrosaurids and interpreted as functionally significant. The taxon is further characterized by a strongly bilobate articulation between the jugal and maxilla, as well as elongate rostral processes of the maxilla, both of which contribute to its distinct cranial morphology.

The premaxilla forms a broad, expanded beak. It lacks teeth, as in other hadrosaurs, and shows a slightly rugose (textured) surface along the oral margin. The ascending process extends upward and curves back over the snout, contributing to the narial region. The beak itself is not recurved like in later hadrosaurs, which is one of those subtle primitive traits that stands out when you compare it closely. The maxilla is large and elongated, with prominent rostral processes and a well-developed dorsal process. It houses a dental battery with about 36 tooth positions, already showing the beginnings of the complex chewing system hadrosaurs are known for. One of the key features here is the maxillopalatal unit, which is more derived than in earlier iguanodontians. The jugal is relatively gracile compared to later hadrosaurs. It retains a contact with the ectopterygoid, which is considered a primitive trait lost in more derived hadrosaurids. The lower jaw is massive and deep, particularly toward the front. The predentary and dentary are robust and expanded, giving the snout a downturned, ventrally deflected shape. The postcranial remains are fragmentary but include ribs, vertebrae, limb elements, and parts of the hyoid apparatus. The ungual is said to be large and wide.

== Paleobiology ==
The maxillopalatal region is already derived, allowing more efficient chewing. The quadrate remains primitive, indicating that full cranial kinesis had not yet evolved. Instead of feeding at mid-height like some iguanodontians, the downward muzzle shape indicates that Protohadros was likely specializing in low-growing plants, probably in floodplains or deltaic vegetation zones. It could have also eaten aquatic vegetation.
