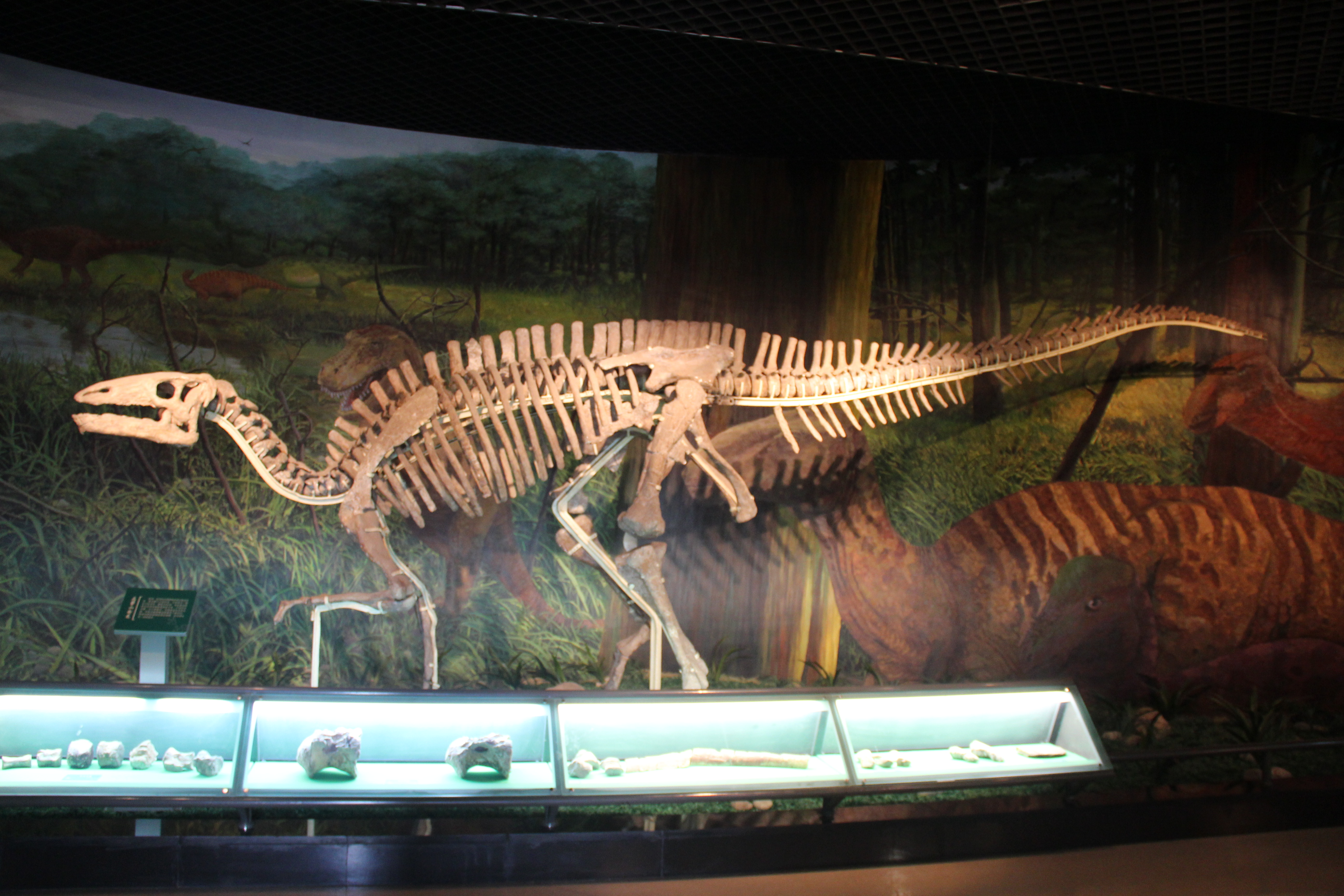
- Restored skeleton

Scientific classification
- Kingdom: Animalia
- Phylum: Chordata
- Class: Reptilia
- Clade: Dinosauria
- Clade: †Ornithischia
- Clade: †Ornithopoda
- Superfamily: †Hadrosauroidea
- Genus: †Gongpoquansaurus; You et al., 2014
- Species: †G. mazongshanensis

Binomial name
- †Gongpoquansaurus mazongshanensis (Lü, 1997)

Synonyms
- Probactrosaurus mazongshanensis Lü, 1997

= Gongpoquansaurus =

Gongpoquansaurus Temporal range: Early Cretaceous, Albian

Extinct genus of dinosaurs

Gongpoquansaurus (meaning "Gongpoquan reptile") is an extinct genus of basal hadrosauroid dinosaur that was not formally named until 2014, while the name was a nomen nudum for many years previously. It is known from IVPP V.11333, a partial skull and postcranial skeleton. It was collected in 1992 at locality IVPP 9208–21, from the Albian Zhonggou Formation (Xinminpu Group), in Mazongshan, Gansu Province, China. The specimen was first described and named by Lü Junchang in 1997 as the third species of Probactrosaurus, Probactrosaurus mazongshanensis. Following its description, several studies found it to be less derived than the type species of Probactrosaurus in relation to Hadrosauridae. In 2014, the species was formally redescribed, and the describers erected Gongpoquansaurus.

== History of discovery ==
Expeditions into the Gansu Province of northwestern China began with the Sino-Swedish Expedition of 1930 to 1931, where discoveries of dinosaurs including the now-dubious early ceratopsian Microceratops sulcidens. These discoveries were followed by occasional observations of dinosaur bones in the Houhongquan Basin in the 1960s, and then the Gongpoquan Basin in 1986. Such observations led to the China-Canada Dinosaur Project taking a reconnaissance trip to the Gongpoquan Basin in 1988, but no further expeditions were led until the Sino-Japanese Silk Road Dinosaur Expedition of 1992 and 1993, led by Chinese paleontology Dong Zhiming of the Institute of Vertebrate Paleontology and Paleoanthropology (IVPP) and Japanese paleontologst Yoichi Azuma of the Fukui Prefectural Dinosaur Museum (FPDM). The first description of many of the newly-discovered fossils, from Mazongshan area of Gansu and the Turpan Basin of Xinjiang, was in 1997 as part of a book on the Sino-Japanese Silk Road expedition, following 1992 and 1993 excavations as well as a 1996 display of the fossils in Nagoya City Science Museum. One collection of these fossils, discovered in 1992 in a sandstone in the Mazongshan area, was described as the new species of the hadrosauroid Probactrosaurus, P. mazongshanensis. P. mazongshanensis was named in 1997 by Chinese paleontologist Lü Junchang for a partial skull, the holotype IVPP V. 11333, and a partial skeleton including almost all regions of the body, IVPP V. 11334.

Probactrosaurus mazongshanensis was found at the field locality IVPP 9208, within the Early Cretaceous of the Xinminbao Group in the Gongpoquan Basin. The Early Cretaceous deposits of the Gongpoquan Basin of the Xinminbao Group form two distinct facies, with P. mazongshanensis known from the upper grey beds. Carbon isotopes from the Xinminbao Group of Yujingzi Basin show sediments of the area are correlated to the ocean anoxic event named the Paquier Event, spanning the late Aptian to early Albian. Radiometric dating of the Xiagou Formation and Zhonggou Formation elsewhere allows the sediments of the Yujingzi Basin to be identified, with the lower gray to green-gray mudstones and siltstones being the Xiagou Formation, while the red sandstones are the base of the Zhonggou and the upper grey sandstones. The upper grey beds, which are only found in the Gongpoquan Basin, are above the red beds, placing P. mazongshanensis higher in the Zhonggou Formation with an early to mid-Albian age.

Following the initial description of P. mazongshanensis, numerous other hadrosauroids were named from the Xinminbao Group of Mazongshan, including Equijubus, Jintasaurus, and Xuwulong. These new taxa led to the questioning of the generic identity of P. mazongshanensis, with it being interpreted as deserving a new genus name. In 2014, Chinese paleontologists You Hailu, Li Daqing and American paleontologist Peter Dodson reviewed P. mazongshanensis, giving it the new name Gongpoquansaurus. The genus name refers to the Gongpoquan Basin, with the holotype locality itself now being encompassed within the 2,288 km^{2} (883 sq mi) area Subei Gongpoquan Dinosaur Geopark of Gansu Province that was established in 2006. You and colleagues found that Gongpoquansaurus was further from hadrosaurids than the type species of Probactrosaurus, P. gobiensis.

== Classification ==
Originally identified as a species of Probactrosaurus, Gongpoquansaurus has always been identified as a member of Hadrosauroidea. Phylogenetic analysis by You and colleagues in 2014 found it to be further from Hadrosauridae than Probactrosaurus, which was also recovered by later studies including that of Polish paleontologist Daniel Madzia and colleagues in 2020. In this study, Gongpoquansaurus formed a group of Eurasian hadrosauroids with Koshisaurus, Batyrosaurus, Ratchasimasaurus and Proa valdearinnoensis as well as sometimes Altirhinus and Xuwulong. Their results are below.

- Hadrosauroidea
  - - Morelladon
    - Mantellisaurus
  - - Equijubus
    - - - Bolong
        - Ouranosaurus
      - - Jinzhousaurus
        - - - Xuwulong
            - - Altirhinus
              - - Koshisaurus
                - - Gongpoquansaurus
                  - - Batyrosaurus
                    - - Proa
                      - Ratchasimasaurus
          - - Penelopognathus
            - - Sirindhorna
              - Zuoyunlong
              - Probactrosaurus
              - Hadrosauromorpha
