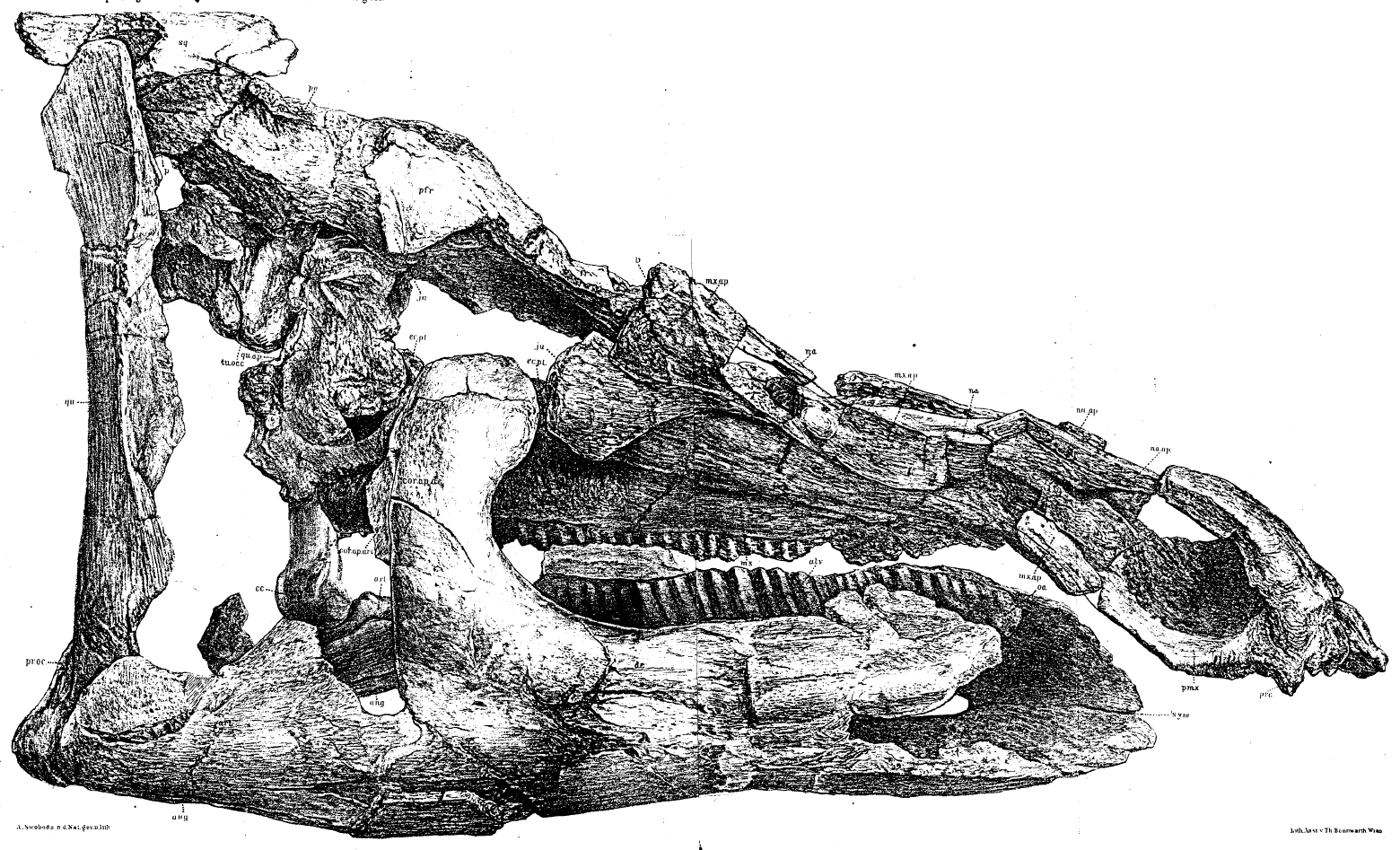
- Holotype skull

Scientific classification
- Kingdom: Animalia
- Phylum: Chordata
- Class: Reptilia
- Clade: Dinosauria
- Clade: †Ornithischia
- Clade: †Ornithopoda
- Clade: †Hadrosauromorpha
- Genus: †Telmatosaurus; Nopcsa, 1903

Type species
- †Telmatosaurus transsylvanicus Nopcsa, 1899

Synonyms
- Hecatasaurus Brown, 1910; Limnosaurus Nopcsa, 1899 (preoccupied)

= Telmatosaurus =

Telmatosaurus Temporal range: Maastrichtian, 70–66 Ma

Extinct genus of dinosaurs

Telmatosaurus (meaning "marsh lizard") is a genus of basal hadrosauromorph dinosaur from the Late Cretaceous of Romania. It was relatively small for its group, measuring approximately 5 m (16 ft) in length and 600 kg (1,300 lb) in body mass, which has been explained as an instance of insular dwarfism.

== Discovery ==
Size of Telmatosaurus compared to a human

In 1895 some peasants presented Ilona Nopcsa, the daughter of their lord, with a dinosaur skull they had found at the estate Săcele in the district Hunedoara (then named Hunyad) in Transylvania. Ilona had an elder brother, Ferenc or Franz Nopcsa von Felső-Szilvás who was inspired by the find to become a paleontology student at the University of Vienna. In 1899 Nopcsa named the skull Limnosaurus transsylvanicus. The generic name was derived from Greek λιμνή, limné, "swamp", a reference to the presumed swamp-dwelling habits of hadrosaurs. The specific name referred to Transylvania. Later Nopcsa discovered that the name Limnosaurus had already been used by Othniel Charles Marsh in 1872 for a crocodilian (later reclassified as Pristichampsus), so in 1903 Nopcsa renamed the genus Telmatosaurus. Telma again means "marsh". In 1910 Barnum Brown, unaware of Nopcsa's replacement name, named the genus Hecatasaurus, but this is a junior objective synonym.

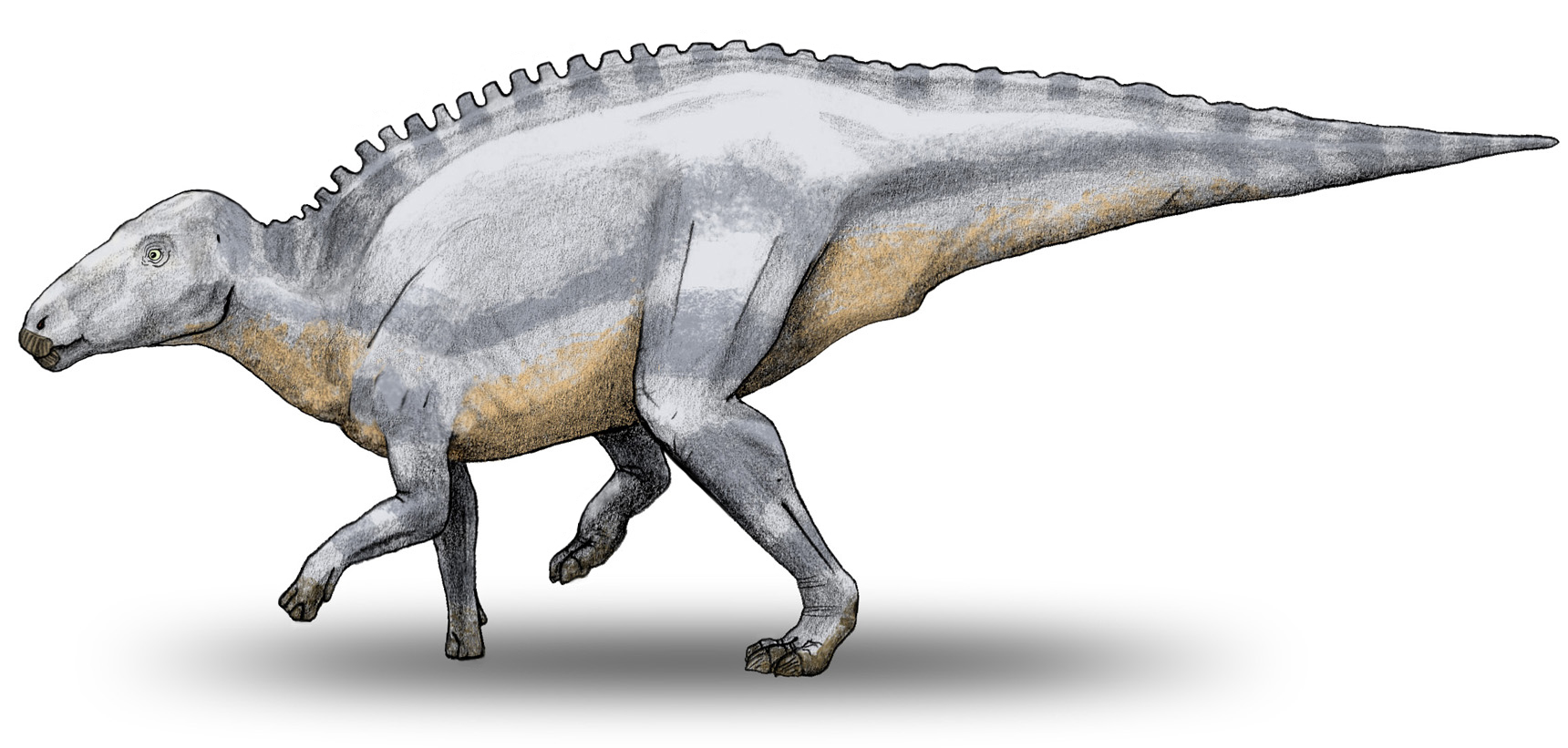
Life restoration

The holotype, NHMUK PV R 3386 (previously referred to as BMNH R 3386), was found in the Haţeg Basin in a layer of the Sânpetru Formation dating from the Maastrichtian, about 68 million years old, at the time part of the Haţeg Island, one of the islands of the European Archipelago. It consists of a skull with lower jaws.

In 1915 Nopcsa referred his species to the genus Orthomerus, as an Orthomerus transsylvanicus. However, since the 1980s, Orthomerus has been considered a nomen dubium, leading to a revival of the name Telmatosaurus. Fragmentary hadrosauroid material from Spain, France and Germany, that had been referred to Orthomerus, is now often assigned to Telmatosaurus, but an identity is hard to prove; the same is also true of many Romanian fragments and eggs.

== Paleobiology ==
=== Paleopathology ===
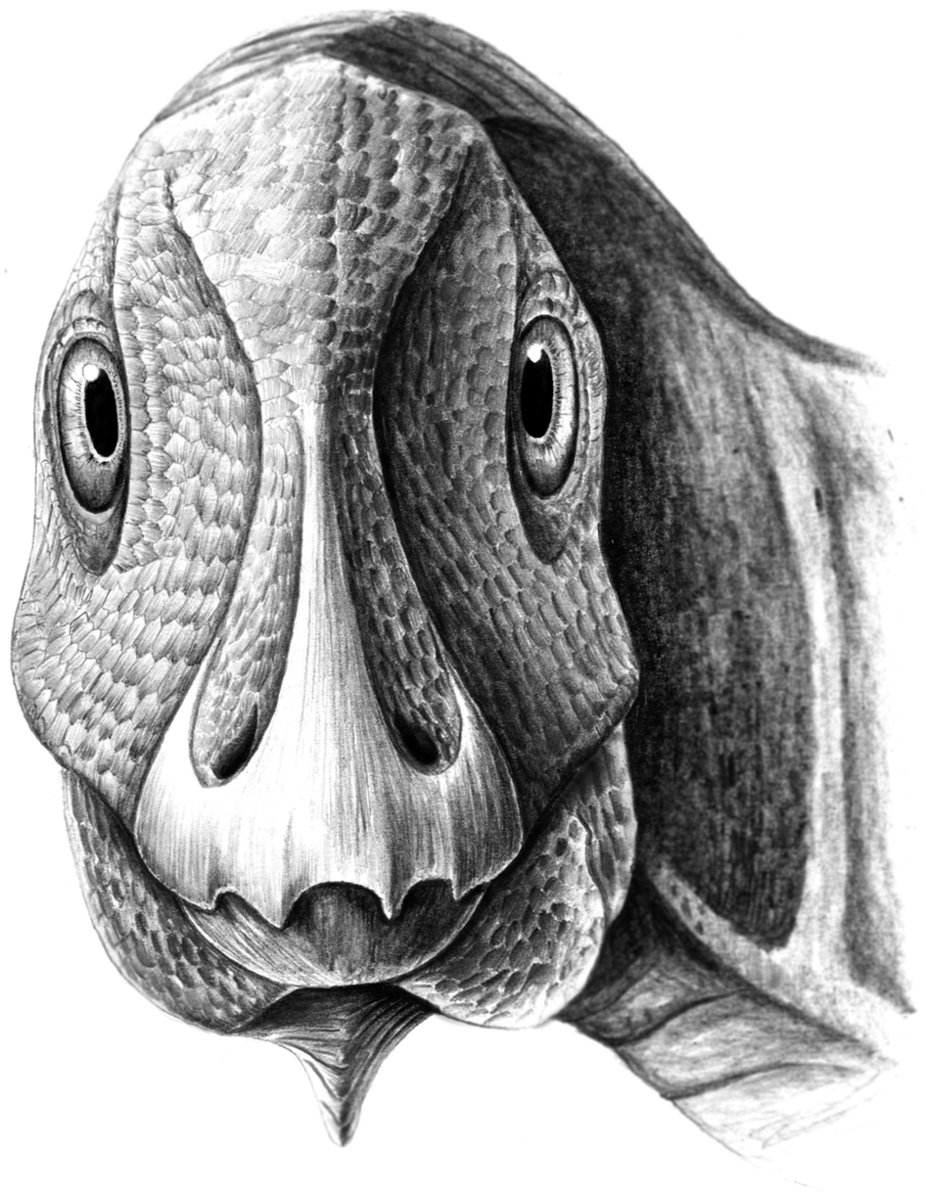
Restoration showing juvenile with jaw deformity

A juvenile Telmatosaurus examined by Dumbrava et al. bears a large non-cancerous tumor called an ameloblastoma on its lower jaw. The presence of this benign tumor in a dinosaur is a first, as before the discovery, ameloblastomas were known only from modern mammals (including humans) and reptiles. The discovery of an ameloblastoma in a dinosaur gives evidence that the development of benign tumors is a basal characteristic, not just a relatively modern condition.

It is unlikely that the tumor caused the dinosaur any serious pain during its early stages of development, just as in humans with the same condition, but researchers can tell from its size that this particular dinosaur died before it reached adulthood. Since its preserved remains consist of only the two lower jaws, no one can ascertain its cause of death. The researchers were left wondering whether the presence of the ameloblastoma could have contributed to its death. From modern examples, it is well known that predators often target weak or injured individuals of the herd. The tumor in this dinosaur had not developed to its full extent at the moment it died, but it could have indirectly contributed to its early demise.

=== Diet ===
Telmatosaurus likely consumed C3 plants, shrubs, herbaceous plants, leaves and seeds.

== Classification ==
Life restoration of the closely related contemporary Kryptohadros

In their 2026 description of the fellow Transylvanian Kryptohadros from the Hațeg Basin, Magyar and colleagues included it in an updated version of the phylogenetic matrix of Longrich et al. (2024) and the similar but less extensive matrix of Dai et al. (2025). Both datasets consistently recovered Kryptohadros as the sister taxon to the Italian Tethyshadros. Telmatosaurus was recovered as the sister to these two taxa using both datasets. Magyar et al. named the group containing these three genera as the new clade Telmatosauridae. The results of the majority rule consensus analysis from the former matrix are displayed in the cladogram below:

- Hadrosauroidea
  - Mantellisaurus atherfieldensis
  - - Ouranosaurus nigeriensis
    - - Jinzhousaurus yangi
      - - Equijubus normani
        - - Sirindhorna khoratensis
          - - Xuwulong yueluni
            - - - Probactrosaurus gobiensis
                - Zuoyunlong huangi
                - - Batyrosaurus rozhdestvenskyi
                  - Jintasaurus meniscus
              - Hadrosauromorpha
                - - Eolambia caroljonesa
                  - Protohadros byrdi
                - - Yunganglong datongensis
                  - - Levnesovia transoxiana
                    - - Tanius sinensis
                      - - Nanyangosaurus zhugeii
                        - - - Bactrosaurus johnsoni
                            - Fylax thyrakolasus
                          - - Gilmoreosaurus mongoliensis
                            - Shuangmiaosaurus gilmorei
                          - - Nanningosaurus dashiensis
                            - - Claosaurus agilis
                              - - Telmatosauridae
                                  - Telmatosaurus transsylvanicus
                                  - - Kryptohadros kallaiae
                                    - Tethyshadros insularis
                                - - - Plesiohadros djadokhtaensis
                                    - - Gobihadros mongoliensis
                                      - Penelopognathus weishampeli
                                  - - Eotrachodon orientalis
                                    - - Zhanghenglong yangchengensis
                                      - - - Huehuecanauhtlus tiquichensis
                                          - Jeyawati rugoculus
                                        - Hadrosauridae
                                          ⊞
                                          - Hadrosaurus foulkii
                                          - Euhadrosauria
                                            - Saurolophinae
                                              ⊞
                                              - Wulagasaurus dongi
                                              - - Brachylophosaurini
                                                - - Kritosaurini
                                                  - - Edmontosaurini
                                                    - Saurolophini
                                              ⊟
                                            - Lambeosaurinae
                                              ⊞
                                              - Aralosaurus tuberiferus
                                              - Jaxartosaurus aralensis
                                              - Nipponosaurus sachalinensis
                                              - - Tsintaosaurus spinorhinus
                                                - - Arenysaurini
                                                  - Corythosauria
                                                    - Lambeosaurini
                                                    - Parasaurolophini
                                              ⊟
                                          ⊟

== See also ==
- Timeline of hadrosaur research
