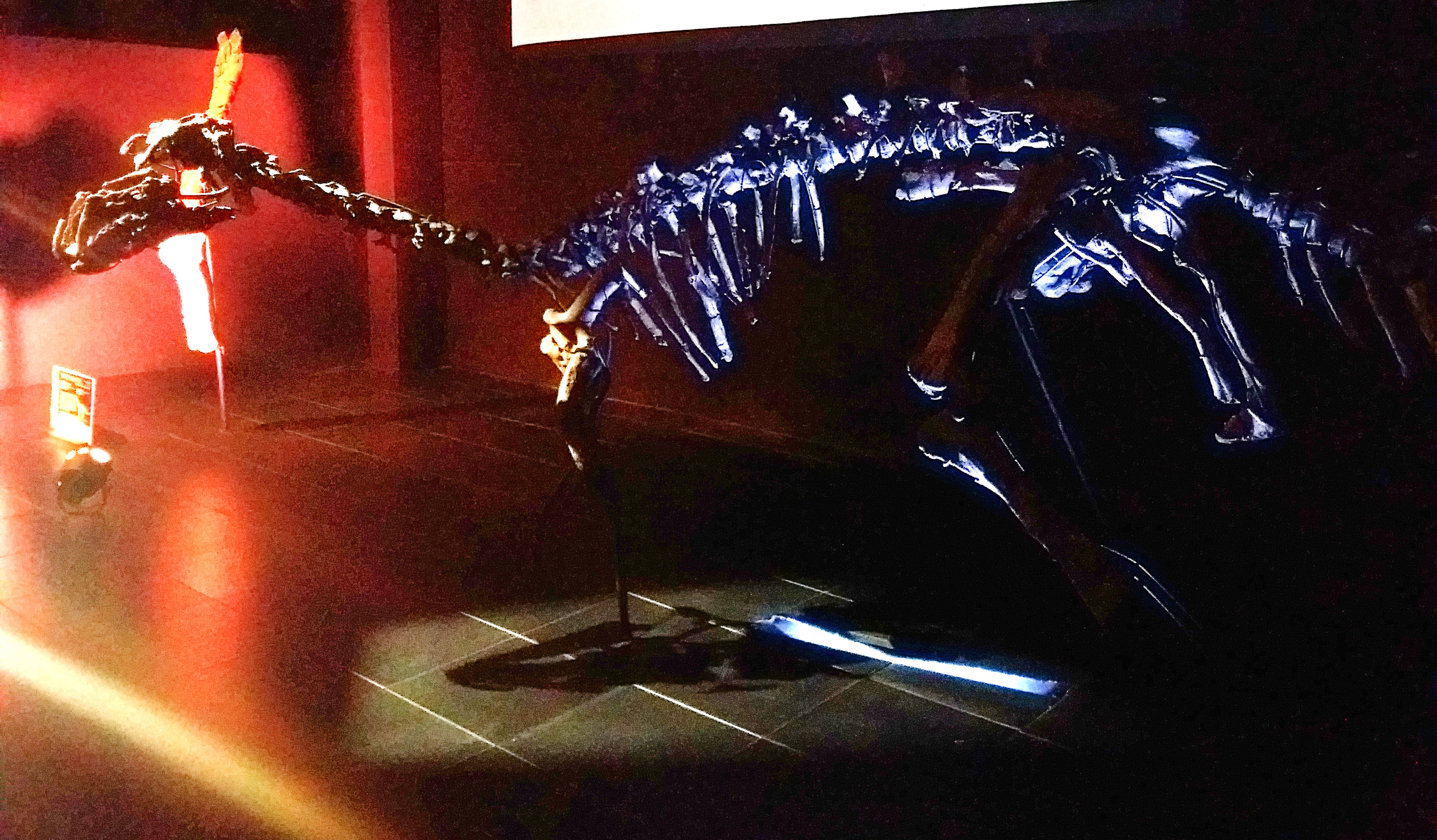

- Mounted display at Dinópolis in Teruel, Spain

Scientific classification
- Kingdom: Animalia
- Phylum: Chordata
- Class: Reptilia
- Clade: Dinosauria
- Clade: †Ornithischia
- Clade: †Ornithopoda
- Clade: †Hadrosauriformes
- Genus: †Proa; McDonald et al., 2012

Type species
- †Proa valdearinnoensis McDonald et al., 2012

= Proa valdearinnoensis =

Proa Temporal range: Early Cretaceous, 112 Ma

Extinct species of reptile

Proa is a genus of basal styracosternan iguanodont known from the Early Cretaceous Escucha Formation (lower Albian stage) of Teruel Province, Spain.

== Discovery and naming ==
It contains a single species, Proa valdearinnoensis. The generic name is from the Spanish word "proa" (meaning "prow"), which alludes to the pointed shape of the animal's predentary bone; while the specific name is derived from Val de Ariño, the traditional name for the coal mines near where the first fossils were found. The animal was described on the basis of three partial skeletons and several skull elements from different individuals.

== Description ==
Proa is distinguished from other basal hadrosauriforms (especially other iguanodontids) in having a predentary that reaches the rostral margin, with divergent lateral processes. It can also be diagnosed by a unique combination of characters: dentary tooth row convex dorsally in lateral view; dentary tooth row extending caudal to the base of the coronoid process; platform between the dentary tooth row and the base of the coronoid process; coronoid process expanded along rostral and caudal margins; maxilla lacks a rostrodorsal process; quadrate straight in lateral view; ilium with dorsal margin convex dorsally, non-pendant supraacetabular process, and postacetabular process that tapers without a break in slope along its dorsal margin; cranial pubic process concave along its dorsal margin but lacks expansion of distal end.

== Phylogeny ==
McDonald et al. (2012) recover Proa at the base of Hadrosauriformes along with Iguanodon. In his osteology of Hypselospinus, Norman (2015) recovered Proa in a monophyletic Iguanodontidae as closer to the East Asian Bolong and Jinzhousaurus than to other European members of Iguanodontidae. Verdu et al (2017) recovered it as part of Eurasian clade including the Asian Xuwulong, Altirhinus, Koshisaurus and Gongpoquansaurus. Proa was found in the most derived position as sister taxon to Batyrosaurus.
