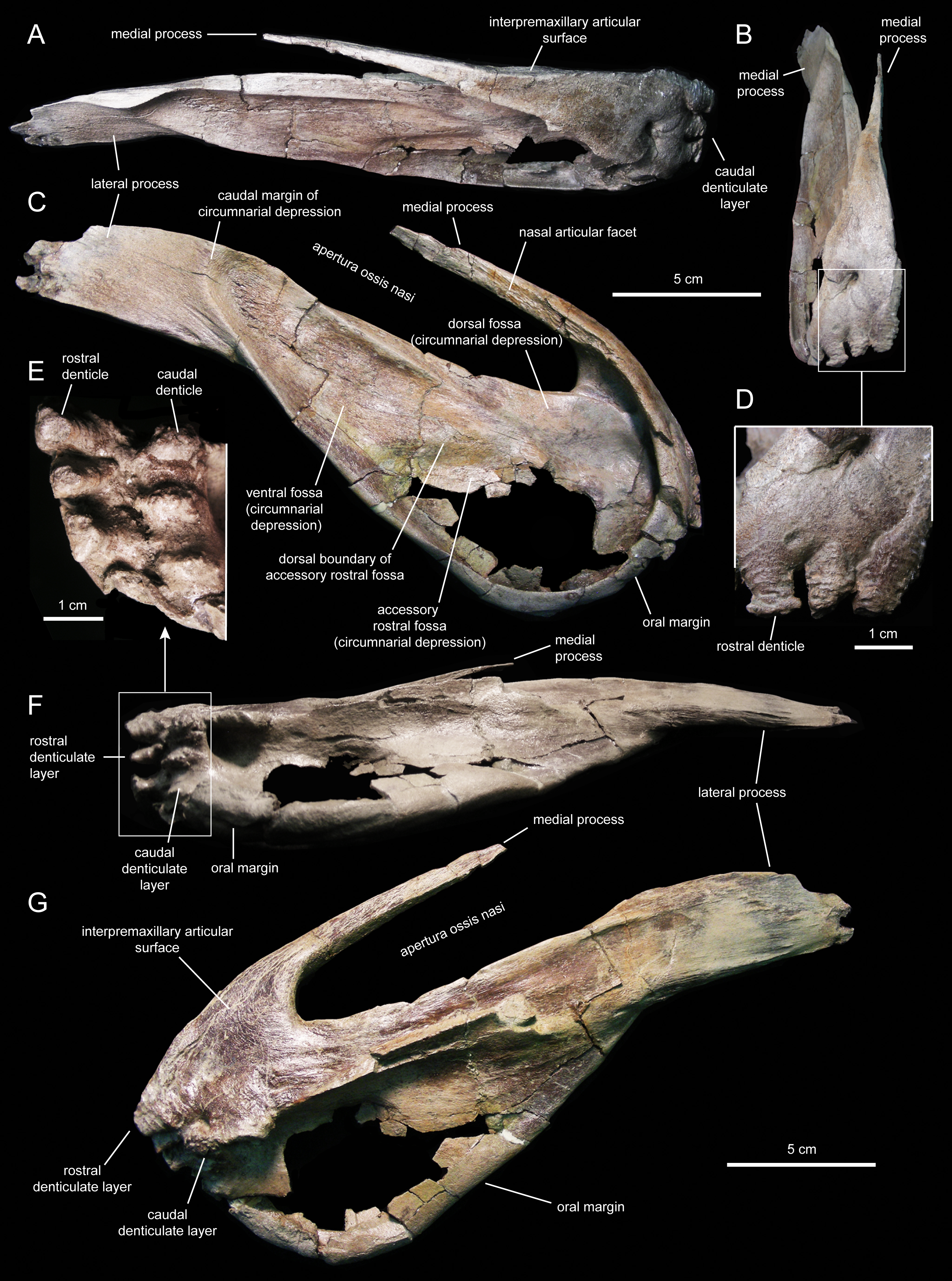
- Right premaxilla

Scientific classification
- Kingdom: Animalia
- Phylum: Chordata
- Class: Reptilia
- Clade: Dinosauria
- Clade: †Ornithischia
- Clade: †Ornithopoda
- Family: †Hadrosauridae
- Genus: †Eotrachodon; Prieto-Márquez, Erickson and Ebersole, 2016

Type species
- †Eotrachodon orientalis Prieto-Marquez, Erickson and Ebersole, 2016

= Eotrachodon =

Eotrachodon Temporal range: Late Cretaceous, 86–83.6 Ma

Extinct genus of reptiles

Eotrachodon (meaning "dawn Trachodon") is a genus of hadrosaurid dinosaur that lived in the Late Cretaceous of eastern North America. The holotype was found in the Mooreville Chalk Formation (Upper Santonian) of Alabama in 2007 and includes a well-preserved skull and partial skeleton, making it a rare find among dinosaurs of Appalachia.

== Description ==
In 2016, Prieto-Márquez, Erickson and Ebersole named the new genus and species Eotrachodon orientalis, with the specific name meaning "of the east". Another primitive hadrosauromorph, Lophorhothon, is also known from the same formation, although Eotrachodon lived a few million years prior.

== Classification ==
A phylogenetic study has found it to be the sister taxon to the hadrosaurid subfamilies Lambeosaurinae and Saurolophinae. This, along with the other Appalachian hadrosaurid Hadrosaurus and the more basal hadrosauroids Lophorhothon, Claosaurus, and Hypsibema (both species), suggests that Appalachia was the ancestral area of Hadrosauridae.

- - - Iguanodon bernissartensis
    - - Jinzhousaurus yangi
      - - Equijubus normani
        - - Probactrosaurus gobiensis
          - - - Jeyawati rugoculus
              - - Eolambia caroljonesa
                - Protohadros byrdi
            - - Tanius sinensis
              - - Bactrosaurus johnsoni
                - - Levnesovia transoxiana
                  - - Gilmoreosaurus mongoliensis
                    - - Telmatosaurus transsylvanicus
                      - - - Jintasaurus meniscus
                          - Lophorhothon atopus
                        - - Claosaurus agilis
                          - - Tethyshadros insularis
                            - Hadrosauridae
                              - Hadrosaurus foulkii
                              - - Eotrachodon orientalis
                                - Saurolophidae(=Euhadrosauria)
                                  - Saurolophinae
                                  - Lambeosaurinae

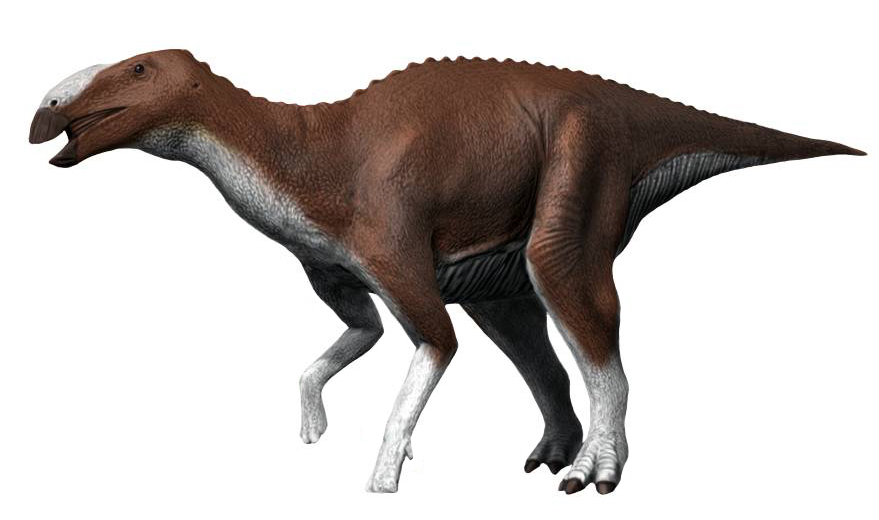
Life restoration of Eotrachodon orientalis

== See also ==
- Timeline of hadrosaur research
- 2016 in paleontology
