= Penelopognathus =

Penelopognathus Temporal range: Early Cretaceous, Albian

Scientific classification
- Kingdom: Animalia
- Phylum: Chordata
- Class: Reptilia
- Clade: Dinosauria
- Clade: †Ornithischia
- Clade: †Ornithopoda
- Superfamily: †Hadrosauroidea
- Genus: †Penelopognathus
- Species: †P. weishampeli

Binomial name
- †Penelopognathus weishampeli Godefroit, Li, and Shang, 2005

Extinct genus of dinosaurs

Penelopognathus (meaning "wild duck jaw") is a genus of hadrosauroid dinosaur which lived in the Early Cretaceous Bayin-Gobi Formation in what is now China. The discovery of this taxon contributes to the hypothesis that hadrosauroids originated in Asia.

== Description ==
The type species, Penelopognathus weishampeli, named after David Weishampel, was described by Godefroit, Li, and Shang in 2005, based on fragmentary jaw fossils.

Its jaw is similar to that of Altirhinus and Probactrosaurus, suggesting that Penelopognathus was related to the two genera. Prieto-Márquez and Carrera Farias (2021) found that Telmatosaurus was the sister taxon to Penelopognathus, which was also found to be closely related to Lophorhothon, as opposed to Tethyshadros. Penelopognathus grew up to around 5 metres (16 ft) long and around 2 metres (6.6 ft) tall when fully grown.
