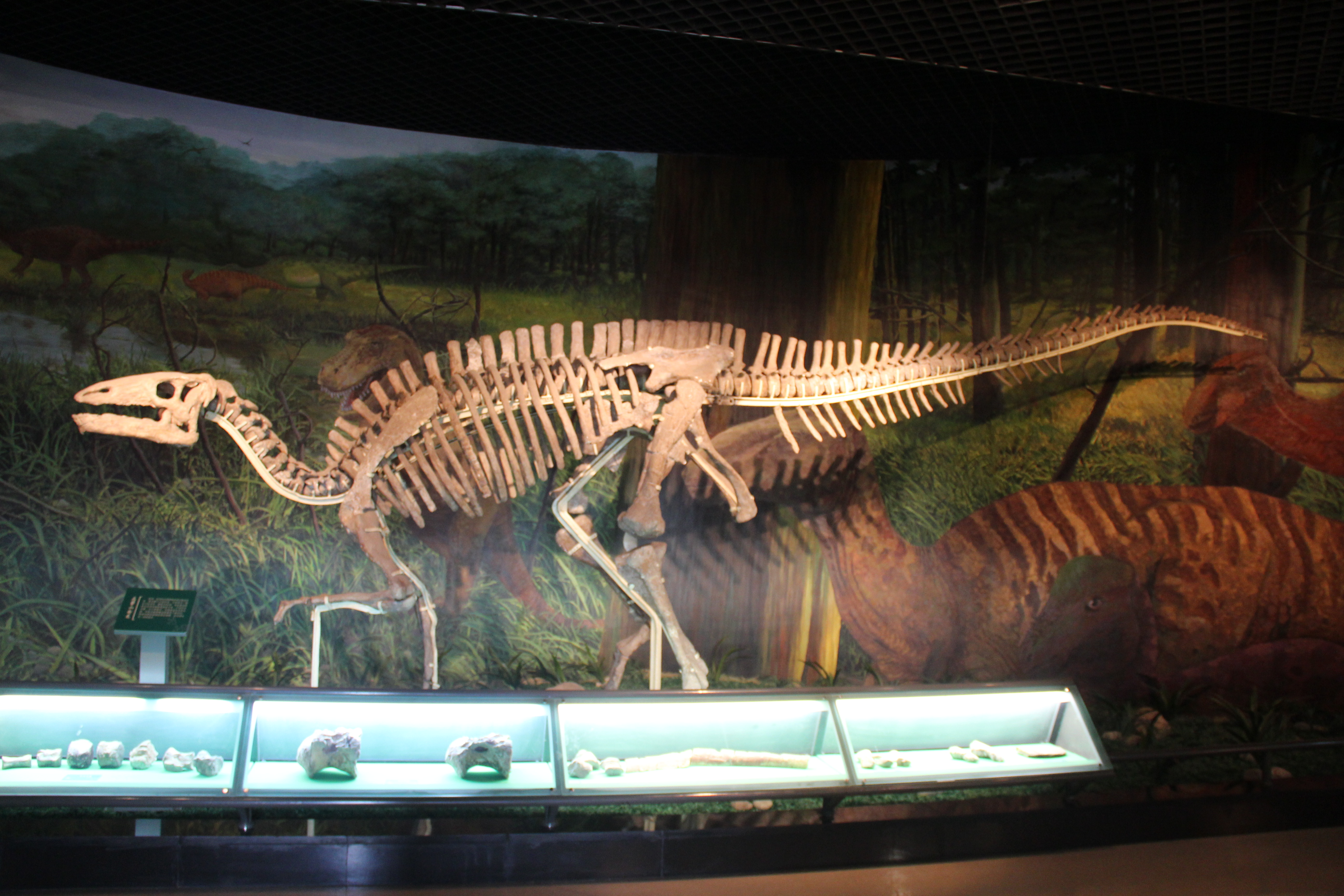
- Skeleton of Gongpoquansaurus

Scientific classification
- Kingdom: Animalia
- Phylum: Chordata
- Class: Reptilia
- Clade: Dinosauria
- Clade: †Ornithischia
- Clade: †Ornithopoda
- Clade: †Hadrosauriformes
- Superfamily: †Hadrosauroidea; Cope, 1869

Type species
- †Hadrosaurus foulkii Leidy, 1858

Subgroups
- †Altirhinus; †Batyrosaurus; †Bolong; †Brighstoneus; †Cariocecus; †Choyrodon; †Comptonatus; †Datonglong; †Equijubus; †Gongpoquansaurus; †Haolong; †Hypsibema?; †Jinzhousaurus; †Koshisaurus; †Ouranosaurus; †Paludohadros; †Penelopognathus; †Portellsaurus; †Probactrosaurus; †Qianjiangsaurus; †Siamodon; †Sirindhorna; †Xuwulong; †Zuoyunlong; †Hadrosauromorpha

Synonyms
- Trachodontoidea Lydekker, 1888; Hadrosauria Huene, 1956

= Hadrosauroidea =

Hadrosauroids Temporal range: Early-Late Cretaceous, 130–66 Ma

Extinct clade of dinosaurs

Hadrosauroidea is a clade or superfamily of ornithischian dinosaurs that includes the "duck-billed" dinosaurs, or Hadrosauridae, and all dinosaurs more closely related to them than to Iguanodon. Their remains have been recovered in Asia, Europe, Africa and the Americas. Many primitive hadrosauroids, such as the Asian Probactrosaurus and Altirhinus, have traditionally been included in a paraphyletic (unnatural grouping) "Iguanodontidae". With cladistic analysis, the traditional Iguanodontidae has been largely disbanded, and probably includes only Iguanodon and perhaps its closest relatives.

== Classification ==
Hadrosauroidea was given a formal phylogenetic definition in the PhyloCode by Daniel Madzia and colleagues in 2021 as "the largest clade containing Hadrosaurus foulkii, but not Iguanodon bernissartensis". The cladogram below follows an analysis by Andrew McDonald, 2012, and shows the position of Hadrosauroidea within Styracosterna:

- Styracosterna
  - Uteodon aphanoecetes
  - - - Hippodraco scutodens
      - Theiophytalia kerri
    - - Iguanacolossus fortis
      - - Lanzhousaurus magnidens
        - - Kukufeldia tilgatensis
          - - Barilium dawsoni
            - Hadrosauriformes
              - Iguanodon bernissartensis
              - Hadrosauroidea
                - Mantellisaurus atherfieldensis
                - Other hadrosauroids

The cladogram below follows an analysis by Wu Wenhao and Pascal Godefroit (2012):

- Hadrosauriformes
  - Iguanodontidae
    - Iguanodon
    - - Ouranosaurus
      - Mantellisaurus
  - Hadrosauroidea
    - Bolong
    - - Equijubus
      - - Jinzhousaurus
        - - Altirhinus
          - - Batyrosaurus
            - - Probactrosaurus
              - - Eolambia
                - - Protohadros
                  - - Bactrosaurus
                    - Levnesovia
                    - - Shuangmiaosaurus
                      - - Tethyshadros
                        - - Telmatosaurus
                          - Hadrosauridae

Cladogram after Prieto-Marquez and Norell (2010):

- Hadrosauroidea
  - - Jinzhousaurus
    - Penelopognathus
  - - Equijubus
    - - Probactrosaurus
      - - - Eolambia
          - Protohadros
        - - Tanius
          - - Bactrosaurus
            - - Gilmoreosaurus
              - - Telmatosaurus
                - - Shuangmiaosaurus
                  - Nanyangosaurus
                  - Lophorhothon
                  - Hadrosauridae

A phylogenetic analysis performed by Ramírez-Velasco et al. (2012) found a large polytomy between all hadrosauroids that are more derived than Probactrosaurus but less derived than Hadrosauridae. The exclusion of Claosaurus, Jeyawati, Levnesovia, Nanyangosaurus, Shuangmiaosaurus and Telmatosaurus from the analysis resulted in a more resolved topology:

- Hadrosauroidea
  - Jinzhousaurus yangi
  - - Fukuisaurus tetoriensis
    - - Penelopognathus weishampeli
      - - Equijubus normani
        - - Probactrosaurus gobiensis
          - - - Eolambia caroljonesa
              - Protohadros byrdi
            - - Tanius sinensis
              - - - Bactrosaurus johnsoni
                  - Glishades ericksoni
                - - Gilmoreosaurus mongoliensis
                  - - Huehuecanauhtlus tiquichensis
                    - - - Jintasaurus meniscus
                        - Tethyshadros insularis
                      - Hadrosauridae

== See also ==
- Timeline of hadrosaur research
