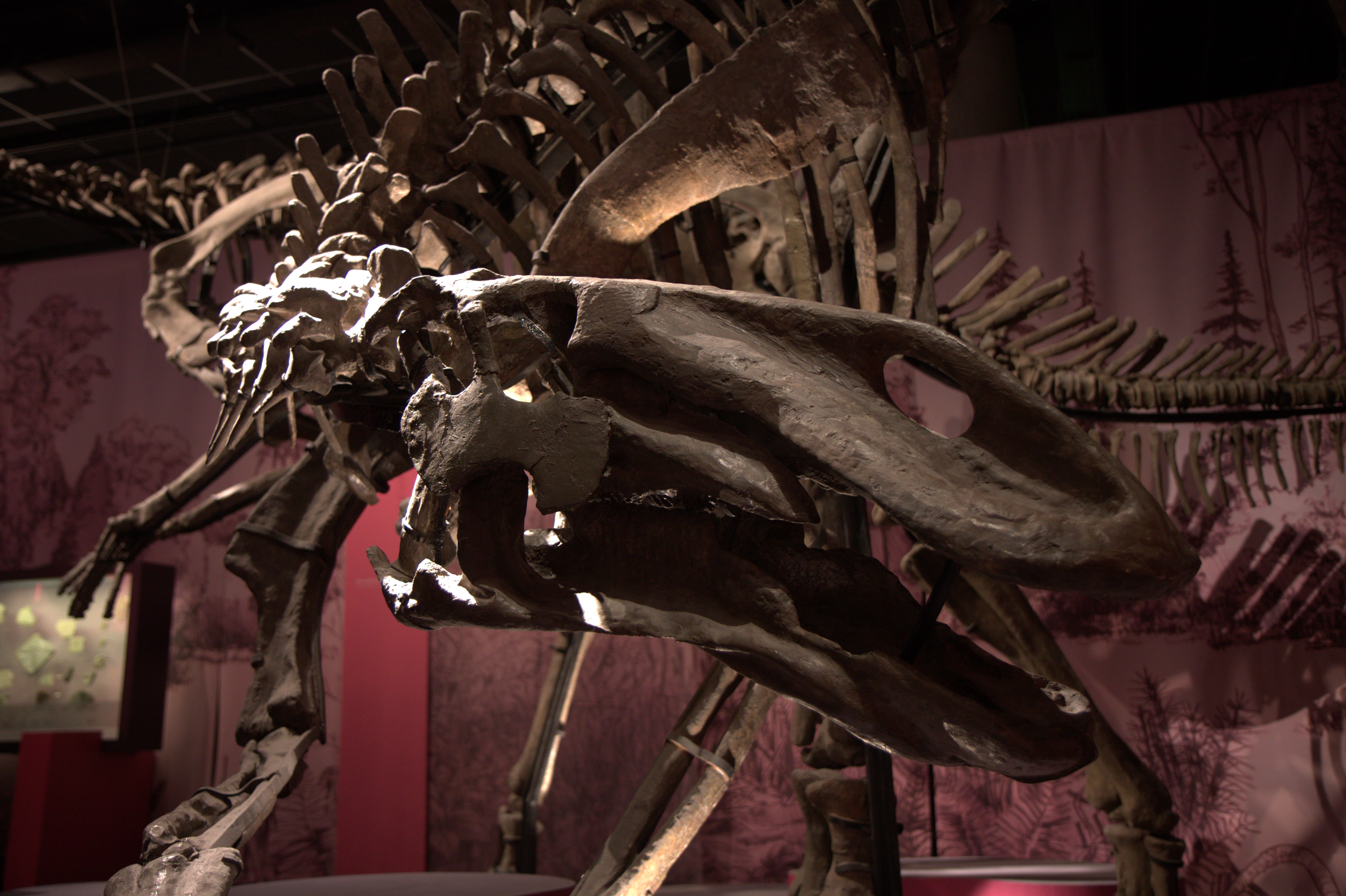
- Reconstructed skeleton at the National Museum of Natural History, France

Scientific classification
- Kingdom: Animalia
- Phylum: Chordata
- Class: Reptilia
- Clade: Dinosauria
- Clade: †Ornithischia
- Clade: †Ornithopoda
- Clade: †Hadrosauromorpha
- Genus: †Gilmoreosaurus; Brett-Surman, 1979

Species
- G. mongoliensis (Gilmore, 1933) (type); G. atavus? (Nesov, 1995); G. arkhangelskyi? (Nesov, 1995); G. kysylkumense? (Nesov, 1995)

= Gilmoreosaurus =

Gilmoreosaurus Temporal range: Late Cretaceous, ~96 Ma

Hadrosauroid dinosaur genus from the Late Cretaceous

Gilmoreosaurus (meaning "Charles Whitney Gilmore's lizard") is a genus of hadrosauromorphan dinosaur from the Late Cretaceous of Asia. The type species is Gilmoreosaurus mongoliensis, known from the Iren Dabasu Formation of Inner Mongolia, dating to 96 million years ago. Additional specimens have been described as distinct species, including G. atavus from the Khodzhakul Formation of Uzbekistan, and G. arkhangelskyi from the Bissekty Formation, also of Uzbekistan. However, these are based on very fragmentary remains, and their classification is dubious. An additional species, G. kysylkumense, also from the Bissekty Formation, is sometimes included, though it has also been referred to the related genus Bactrosaurus.

== History of study ==
=== Asian expeditions and Gilmore's "Mandschurosaurus mongoliensis" ===
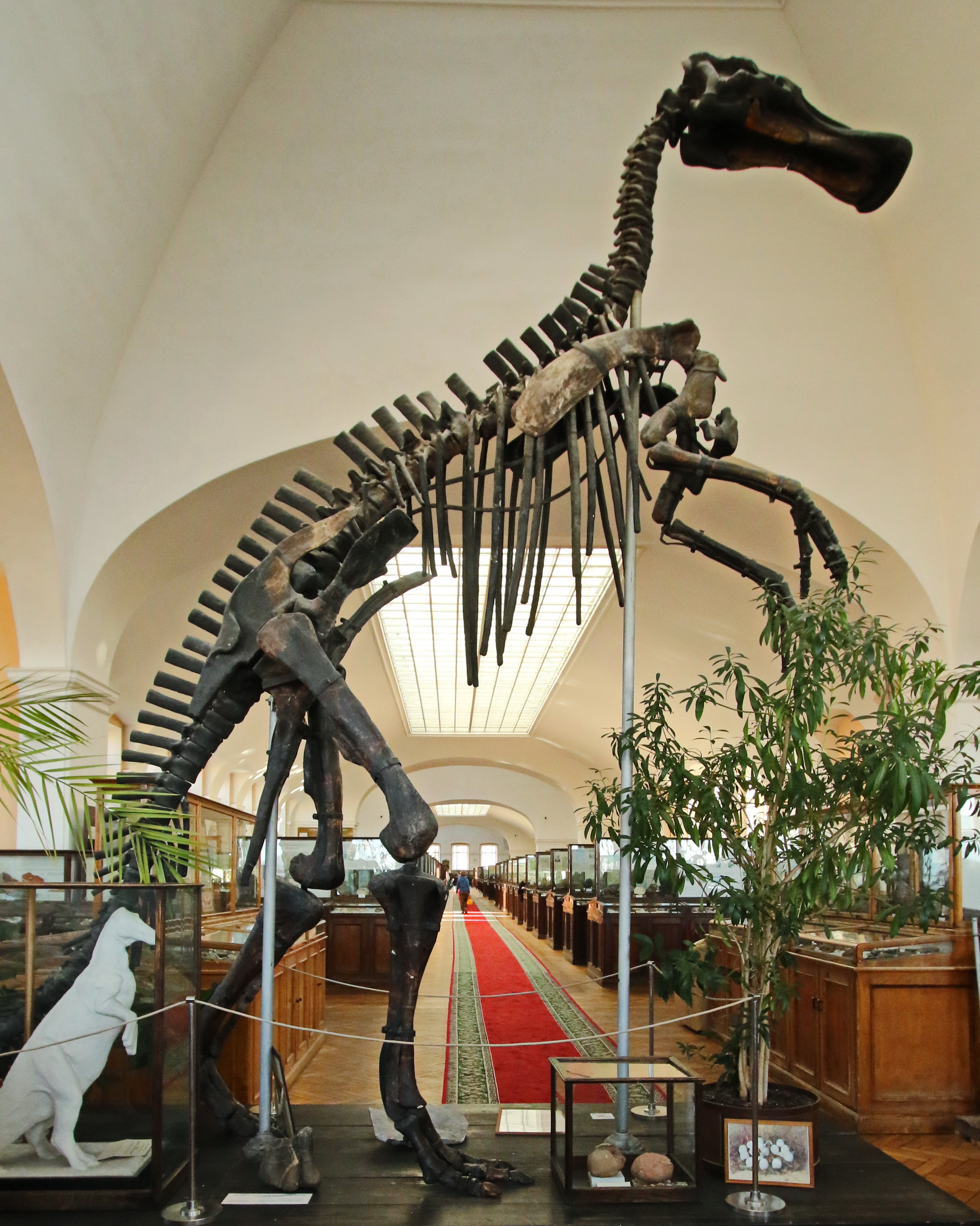
Heavily reconstructed skeleton meant to represent "Mandschurosaurus amurensis", to which the type species of the genus Gilmoreosaurus was initially assigned

In the early twentieth century, the American Museum of Natural History (AMNH) conducted a series of palaeontological expeditions to the deserts of Asia. One geologic formation where work was conducted during these expeditions was the Iren Dabasu Formation in Inner Mongolia, China. The fieldwork here was done by a field team led by Walter Granger. Nobody among them were specialists in dinosaurs; instead the AMNH had sent mostly geologists and mammal palaeontologists. Many dinosaur remains were discovered, but their nature would remain unknown to the discovers until experts back in America examined the material. The initial excavations of dinosaur fossils at Iren Dabasu took place on three days in April and May 1922. They conducted more extensive digs a year later from April 23 to June 1, 1923. Several new genera and species were discovered from the formation; among them were two new types of hadrosaur. It was these two that would later prove to be the most significant of the finds. They were among the first remains of the group from the continent, preceded only by Mandschurosaurus amurensis, Tanius sinensis, some remains from Turkestan and Saurolophus krischtofovici, with the validity of the latter species already doubted. The material that would eventually come to be known as Gilmoreosaurus was discovered by George Olsen (a member of Granger's team) in two different quarries (145 and 149, about 1 kilometre (0.62 miles) apart), around 14 kilometres (8.7 miles) northeast of the town of Erenhot and not far from the border with Mongolia. Several individuals were represented and between them most of the skeleton found, but the material was disarticulated and so what pieces belonged to each individual is not possible to determine for certain.

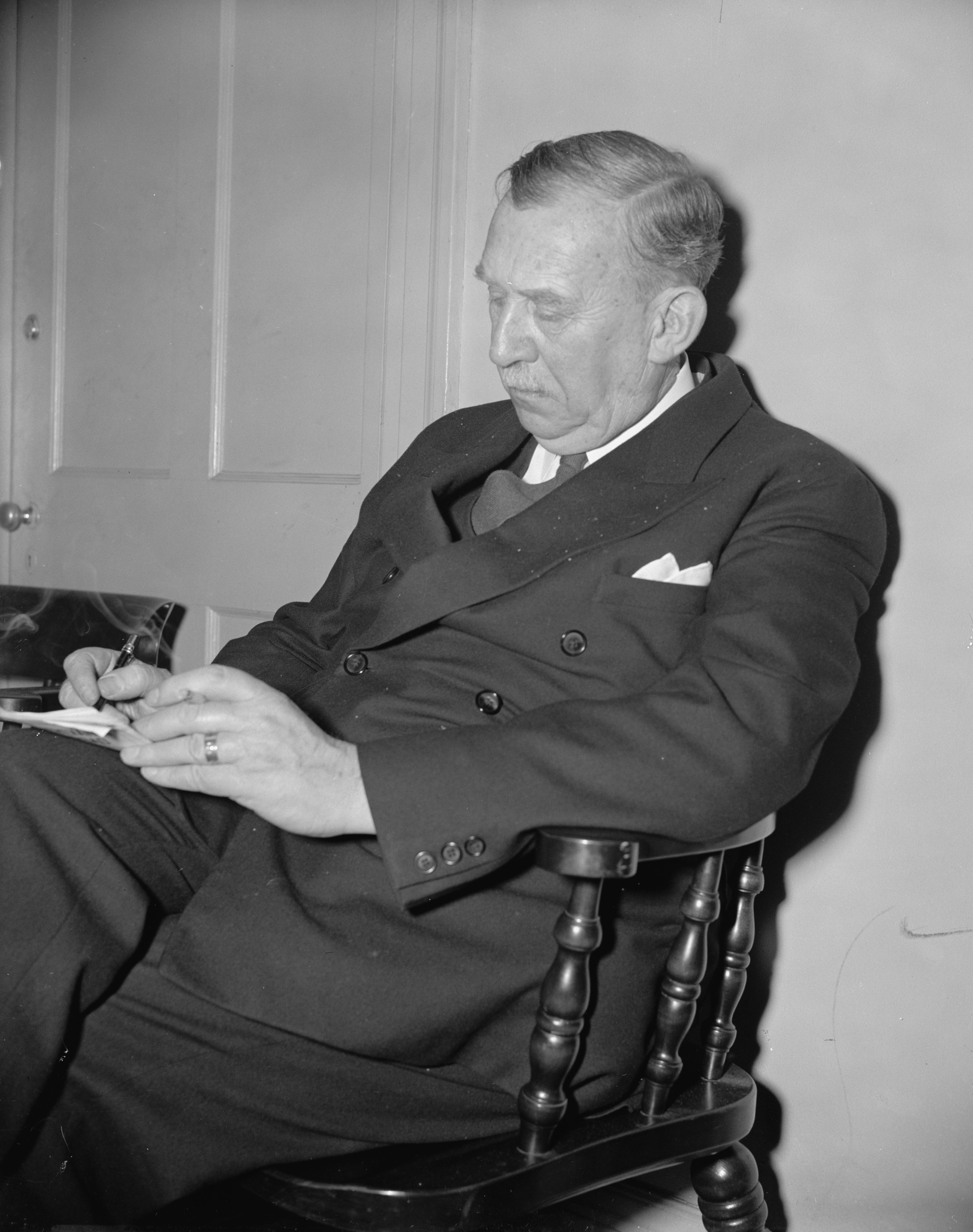
Gilmoreosaurus was discovered during expeditions led by Walter W. Granger

Once it had arrived back to New York, the Mongolian material was given to Barnum Brown to study. Brown was renowned for his field collection of dinosaurs, but he was too busy to attend the Asian expeditions. He did extensive work on the material and had prepared names for the new species, but for unknown reasons he ceased work on the project before its completion. Instead, the fossils were sent to the Smithsonian and would be described and named as new species by Charles W. Gilmore. The Smithsonian had little in terms of a dinosaur fossil collection and Gilmore as such was more reliant on the literature than first hand comparisons in his studies. Despite this, his work in the field is considered to be of high quality. He published his findings in 1933, describing both hadrosaurs as well as several other dinosaurs. One of the hadrosaurs, then thought to be a lambeosaur, was the novel genus Bactrosaurus. The second, known from at least four individuals and thought to be a hadrosaurine, was named as a new species of Mandschurosaurus, M. mongoliensis. This choice was made tentatively; Gilmore was mindful of the possibility his species may later require its own genus, but did not currently feel there was sufficient difference from M. amurensis for this. Gilmore's description of the species' anatomy was rather brief and would prove inadequate to understanding the taxon decades later; he provided no clear diagnosis (a list of what traits establish a species as different from its relatives). Another issue caused by Gilmore's work was that all the material, from all the individuals, was catalogued under a singular specimen number. Later palaeontologists thus had to recatalogue all of the elements under more modern standards.

Following its original naming, Gilmore's species would remain poorly understood and received limited attention from other palaeontologists. Despite this, the occasions it was discussed often brought major taxonomic changes. One persistent issue surrounding the taxonomy of the Iren Dabasu hadrosaurs was the nature of cranial material found at the Bactrosaurus quarry. Gilmore assumed, based on its association with the rest of the Bactrosaurus material, that it must belong to that genus; no other elements at the site were inconsistent with just one species being present. He was perplexed, however, by its lack of a hollow-crest, something thought universal among lambeosaurs. He did consider the possibility it belonged to M. mongoliensis, and also noted its resemblance to specimens of the genus Tanius, but eventually discarded both ideas. C. C. Young revived the latter idea, and assigned the material to Tanius. Regarding Mandschurosaurus he agreed with Gilmore's referral of his species to the genus, and went further to say it's possible it actually represents the same species as M. amurensis. Anatoly K. Rozhdestvensky, in the 1960s, considered a different solution; that Bactrosaurus was in fact a hadrosaurine, not a lambeosaurine. Furthermore, he thought that M. mongoliensis was merely a synonym of his hadrosaurine Bactrosaurus, a position he would continue to hold in future works. Future authors would disagree, reaffirming the two hadrosaurs as distinct and Bactrosaurus as a lambeosaur.

=== Reclassification as Gilmoreosaurus and subsequent research ===
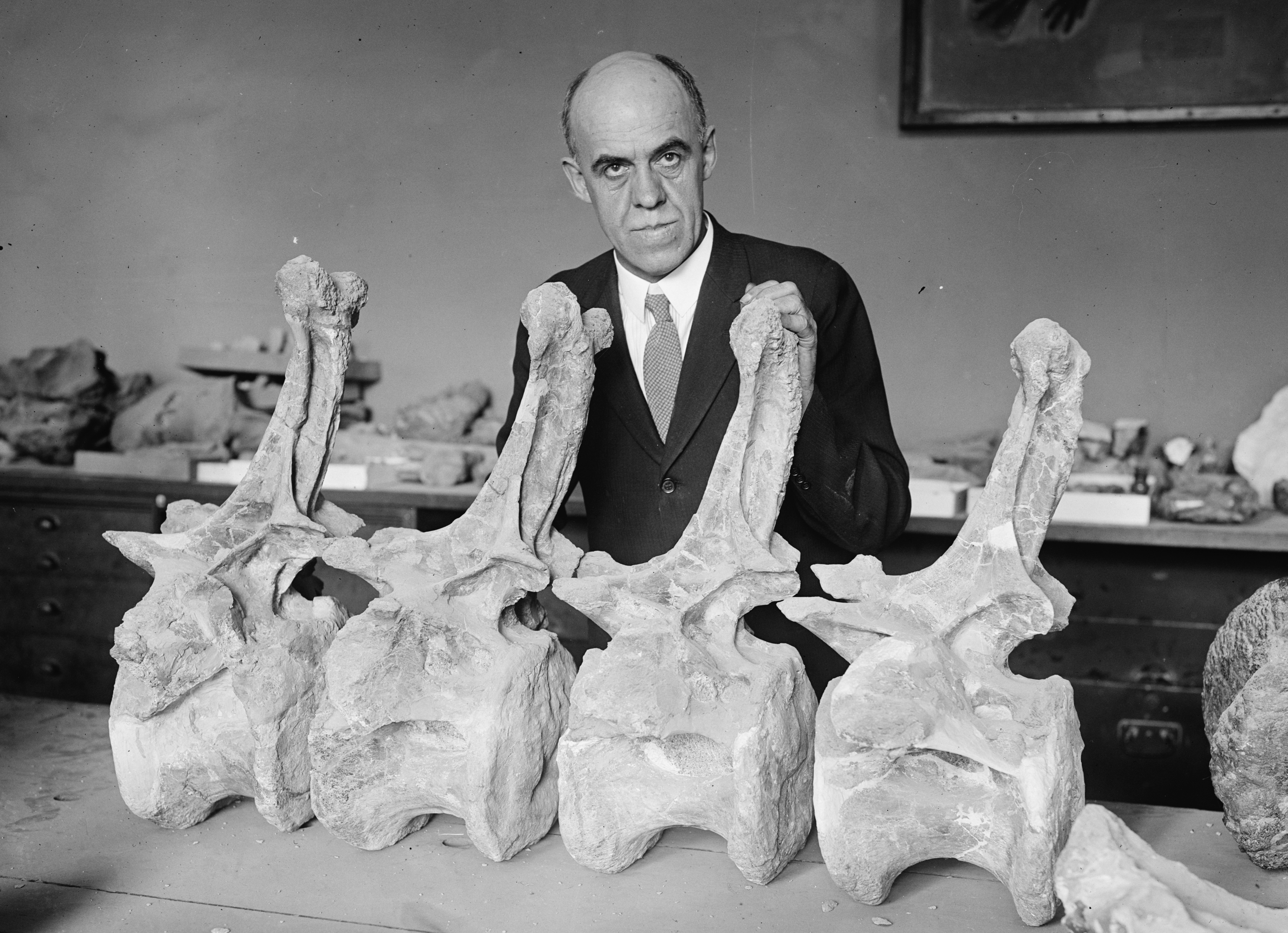
Charles W. Gilmore, who first described the species; when it received its own genus, the taxon was named after him

The next major change in taxonomy would come from Michael K. Brett-Surman, who was in the process of a revision of the entire hadrosaur family. Firstly, he provided a novel diagnosis for the species in his 1975 master's thesis. However, Brett-Surman considered Mandschurosaurus amurensis to be dubious; he therefore thought it necessary to give Gilmore's species a new generic name. As such, he coined the genus Gilmoreosaurus in 1979, honouring Gilmore, and created the new combination Gilmoreosaurus mongoliensis. He considered Gilmore's two hadrosaurs to be of great importance, something he elaborated on in a short 1980 paper. He described the anatomy of Gilmoreosaurus as "partly iguanodont and partly hadrosaurine" and saw it as the ancestral form of hadrosaurine; Bactrosaurus, likewise, was seen as the ancestral lambeosaur. It was based in part on the two species, as well as on Probactrosaurus, that he concluded that hadrosaurs had originated in Asia. One thing that interested Brett-Surman greatly was the similarity of the Asian fauna to the later fauna of the North American Two Medicine Formation; Gilmore had, in his 1933 paper, made similar comments about the nature of Asian and American faunas. The 1980 paper noted that a lot of additional material from Iren Dabasu was never described by Gilmore, especially material pertaining to juvenile material. Brett-Surman reported that he and John R. Horner were at work investigating this material to form a more complete understanding of the formations' fauna. Referring to this, he concluded the paper by saying: "Although no more expeditions are possible to Mongolia by this time, light will be shed on the natural history of dinosaurs by further scientific expeditions to the basement of the natural history museum".

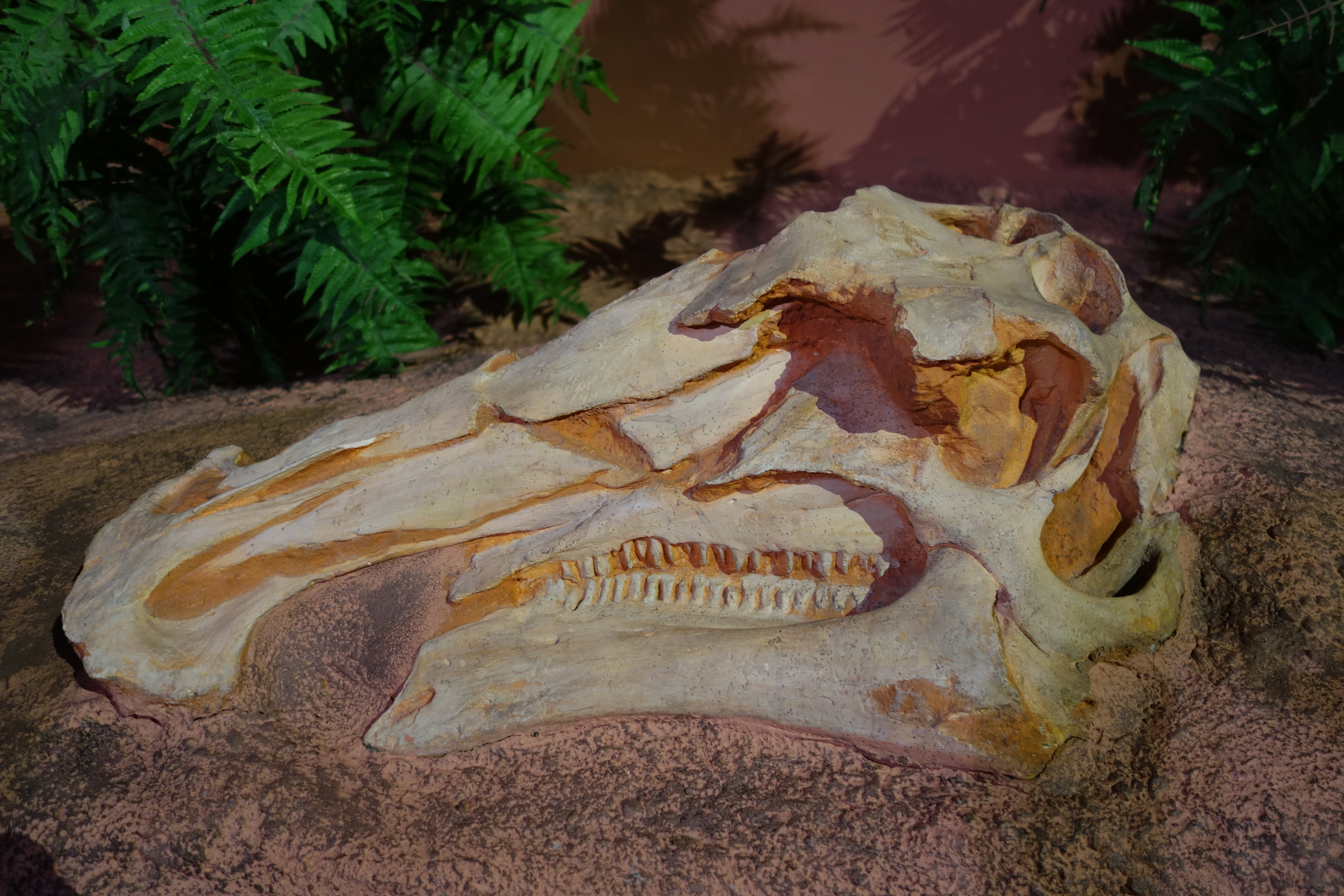
Reconstructed Bactrosaurus skull at the Museum of Ancient Life; skull material of this taxon proved to be a cornerstone of debate involving Gilmoreosaurus

Halszka Osmólska and Teresa Maryańska published a paper in 1981 which focused on Saurolophus angustirostris, but also provided comments on Asian hadrosaurs as a whole. Among these comments, they returned to the issue of the skull material. They disagreed the otherwise monospecific nature of the quarry (i.e. only one species seeming to be present) was stronger evidence than the discordant anatomy of the material. As such, they revived Young's model and tentatively assigned the material to Tanius, which they felt it fit most closely. They noted the skull may prove to belong to either Gilmoreosaurus or Bactrosaurus after additional research. This would come to be in 1985, when Horner and David B. Weishampel would re-examine the material of both Iren Dabasu genera as well as material Gilmore never described, as had been indicated by Brett-Surman. Osmólska provided feedback on their study. The relevant new material was frontal remains that the authors considered to be "clearly lambeosaurine" in nature, and so referrable to Bactrosaurus. As they could not possibly fit with the skull material, they concluded said material wasn't from the genus. Instead, they decided that it, congruent with its seemingly hadrosaurine nature, belonged to Gilmoreosaurus. At the end of the paper they reaffirmed the importance of both genera as the best record of early hadrosaurs.

The issue would finally be put to rest by Pascal Godefroit and colleagues in 1998, when they published a study describing newly discovered Bactrosaurus material. They returned to the original position of Gilmore, that the possibility of two taxa in the Bactrosaurus type quarry was extremely remote and that the skull material belonged not to Gilmoreosaurus but Bactrosaurus. The reasoning for the paradoxical nature of the anatomy was that Bactrosaurus was not a lambeosaur or even hadrosaurid at all but instead a more primitive form of hadrosauroid merely convergent with its later relatives. They remarked that it would be informative to test the phylogenetic affinities of Gilmoreosaurus as well, but that it was too poorly described to allow this. Modern review of the species was considered to be direly needed. Seeking to finally resolve the longstanding issue, Albert Prieto-Márquez and Mark A. Norrel began work on a thorough redescription of Gilmoreosaurus; this was published in 2010. Resolving its phylogenetic position was a priority and the ultimate motive behind the endeavor. All known material of the genus was examined for the study. One thing allowed by the redescription was a modern diagnosis of G. mongoliensis, as the 1975 one was found to be lacking. They also specifically touched on the idea the two Iren Dabasu hadrosaurs could be synonyms as Rozhdestvensky had thought. This idea was rejected, with numerous differences between the two found. Studies since the redescription have been able to include Gilmoreosaurus in research on hadrosaur phylogeny.

== Description ==
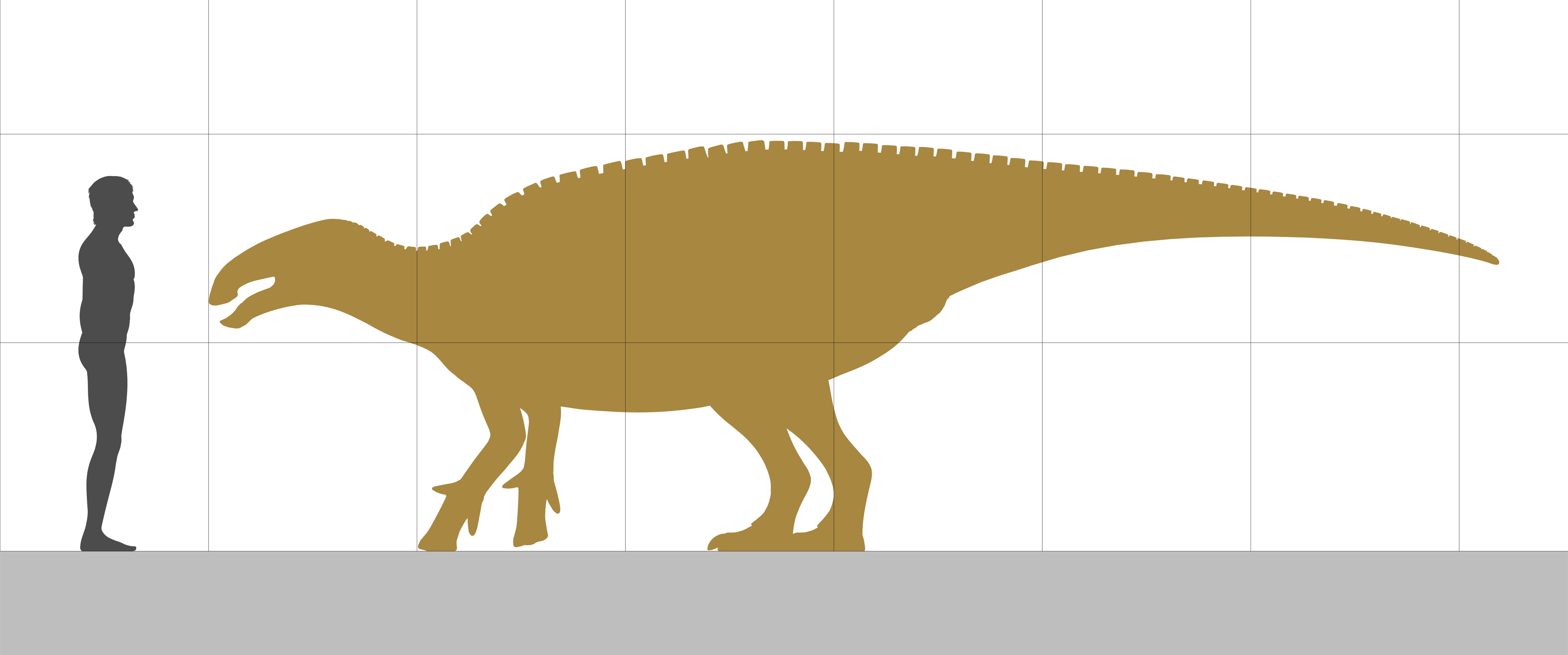
Size compared to a 1.8 m tall human

Gilmoreosaurus was a relatively large-sized hadrosauroid which could grow up to 6.2 m (20 ft) long and obtain weights between 1.2 to 3.6 t (1,200 to 3,600 kg). The genus can be distinguished from other hadrosauroid taxa in having a very reduced paddle-shaped postacetabular process and an asymmetrical manual phalanx III-1 end. Although the preserved elements are very sparse and probably representing more than one individual, the specimen AMNH FARB 30729 represents a single animal composed by a left ulna and radius.

=== Skull and dentition ===
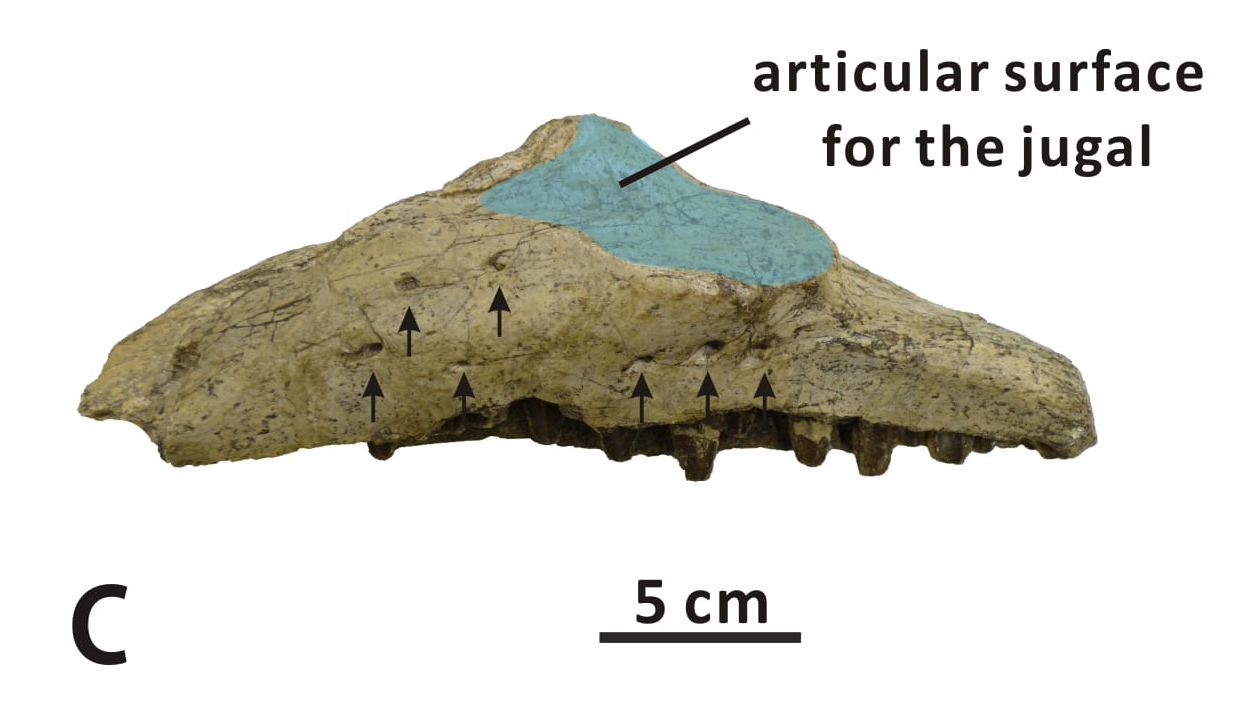
Right maxilla of AMNH FARB 30653 (reversed) in lateral view. Maxillary foramina indicated by arrows

A complete skull articulated is not known from the multiple specimens, however, numerous elements are known such as the right maxilla, dentary, jugal, squamosal and two lacrimals, quadrate and a complete predentary. In a lateral view, the right maxilla of specimen AMNH FARB 30653 is triangular in shape with various foramina on the surface. On the inner side 26 alveolar foramen are preserved and 22 alveoli are filled with teeth but the total count may be unknown due to incompleteness, the surface of this side is rather flat. The teeth are oval-shaped with a moderately pinched upper end and have coarse denticles, these denticles have three diminutive pointed structures. It appears to be that the dentary teeth were more flattened with a pinched lower end as indicated by nine isolated teeth. In all teeth, a ridge-like structure is located at the center. An isolated and partial right jugal is represented by AMNH FARB 30657, which has lost most of the anterior area in the rostral joint. It has a triangular-shaped form in a lateral view and flattened to the inner sides. The partial rostral joint is square and the lateral surface is somewhat concave but in the medial surface the articulation for the maxilla can be identified. The upper surface of the rostral joint forms a flattened socket-like structure that continues towards the rear with the base of the postorbital ramus. This ramus is projected to the top and slightly tilted towards the rear. The upper portion of the postorbital ramus is triangular when seen from the cross-section. Towards the lower end, the anterior surface of the ramus is clipped with a triangle-like pit that wedges towards the bottom to configurate the lower end of the jugal ramus of the postorbital.

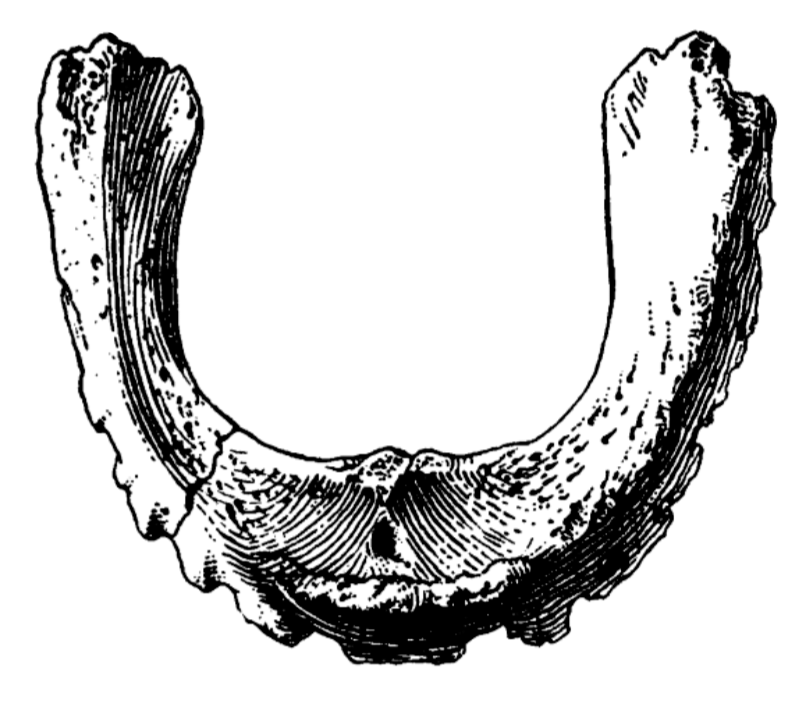
Predentary of AMNH FARB 6369 in bottom view

There are two lacrimal bones preserved from specimens AMNH FARB 30655 and 30656. Overall, the left lacrimal of AMNH FARB 30655 is wedge-shaped in a lateral view, denoting the anterior shape of the orbit, and flattened from the inner side to the lateral one. The top surface is thin and overlapped by the ventral border of the premaxilla joint that is developed from the rear to the bottom. On the bottom surface, a large and elliptical foramen is visible, allowing the connection for the rostral joint of the jugal. On the posterior surface another foramen is present, ending on the ventral surface where the exit is located. These foramina are connected through the lacrimal channel. The right squamosal is labelled as AMNH FARB 30658. The main body is subtriangular with the lateral surface being gently convex. In contrast, its lower inner surface is more concave and cross-cut by a minor ridge-like structure. As a whole, the squamosal is flattened from the inner side to the top. There are three projections coming from the main body, which can be identified as the anterior postorbital joint, the lateral postcotyloid joint and the inner ramus. However, only the lower part of the postorbital joint is preserved. The precotyloid opening is absent, but this feature is very variable in both Hadrosauroidea and Hadrosauridae.

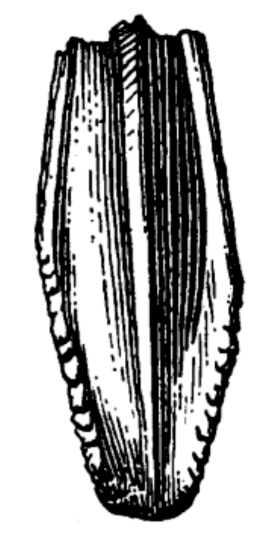
Maxillar tooth

Two quadrate bones are preserved (specimens AMNH FARB 30659 and 30660). It is very straight in general with only a gentle curvature on the posterior border. The articular surface of the head is triangle-shaped and flatted to the lateral side. A relatively large, ridge-like formation can be observed on the posterior edge near the top, likely supporting the squamosal. This character is also reported in other iguanodontians and hadrosauroids, such as Brachylophosaurus or Gryposaurus. The lateral surface of the quadrate is flat and on the anterior border a cut for the quadratojugal can be identified, however, most of its articular borders are lost except a small dorsal area and a long bottom surface. A right dentary is represented by specimen AMNH FARB 30654, a partial element with a badly eroded dental battery. It preserves about 15 alveoli of which none is filled with teeth. The total dentary teeth count on Gilmoreosaurus was probably less than 30 and the tooth row is oriented to the lateral sides as seen in other hadrosauroids, unlike the more advanced hadrosaurids. The upper toothless border of the dentary and a significant portion of the articular border for the predentary are missing, but given that both of these borders have minor lengths—about less than the 25% of the length of the dental battery—they indicate that the toothless area between the tooth row and the predentary was rather reduced—another trait present in hadrosauroids but lost in hadrosaurids. The predentary is represented by a complete element of specimen AMNH FARB 6369, which has a U-shaped form. Numerous and pointed denticles are preserved on the dorsal surface of the predentary, giving a serrated texture.

=== Vertebral column ===
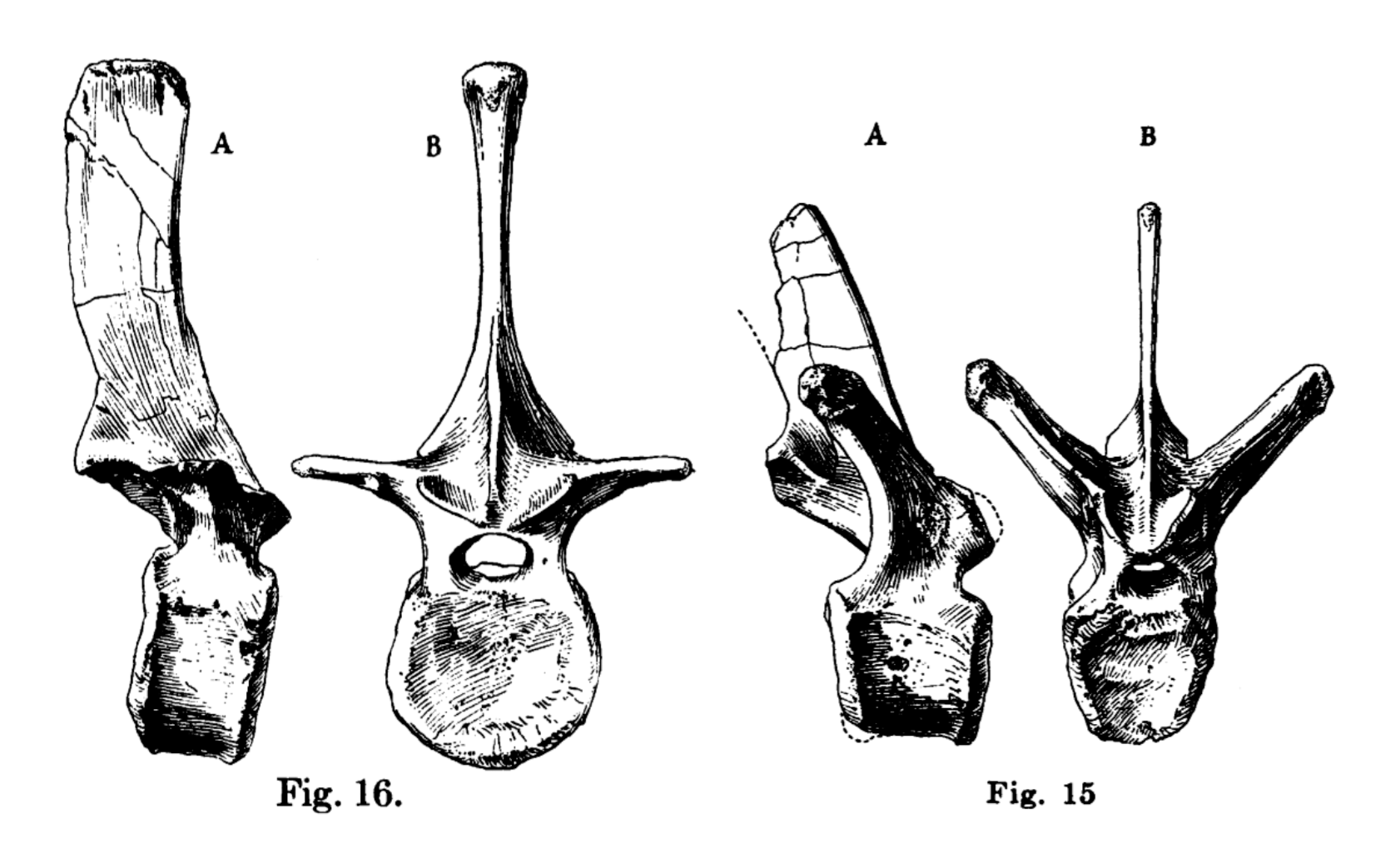
Anterior and posterior dorsal vertebrae from AMNH FARB 30680-30683)

The vertebral column is represented by four cervical, ten dorsal, seven sacral and thirty three caudal vertebrae of several specimens. The vertebrae are mostly similar to those of other hadrosauroids but some traits can be noted. The cervical vertebrae of specimens AMNH FARB 30671-30673 have centra that are opisthocoelous (concave on their posterior sides), heart-shaped in a posterior view and flattened on the inner side. The centra of the anterior dorsals in AMNH FARB 30674-3068 appear to be less opisthocoelous but they also have heart-shaped facets. The neural spines are very elongated and subrectangular in shape, they are slightly curved to the posterior side. In the middle and posterior dorsals of AMNH FARB 30681-30685 the neural spines are more straight and thicker. The preserved sacrum is composed by three elements, three fused vertebrae, four fused neural spines and four fused centra. Being relatively elongated, the centra in the three fused vertebrae are platycoelus (slightly concave at both ends) and have the lineal heart-shaped facets. When seen from the bottom surface, a ridge-like structure is located at the center as in Bactrosaurus, Claosaurus or Iguanodon. The neural canal—where the spinal cord passes through—is very large and expanded to the bottom. The four fused neural spines form a compact element, having very thickened and relatively elongated spines. The last sacral element is represented by four fused centra. These centra are widened to the lateral sides and while the posterior facet is lightly concave, the anterior one is more flattened. Lastly, the caudal vertebrae have very flattened centra with smally neural canals and neural spines that are projected towards the rear, although these traits become progressively marked towards the tail end as seen in many other iguanodontians.

=== Limbs and limb girdles ===
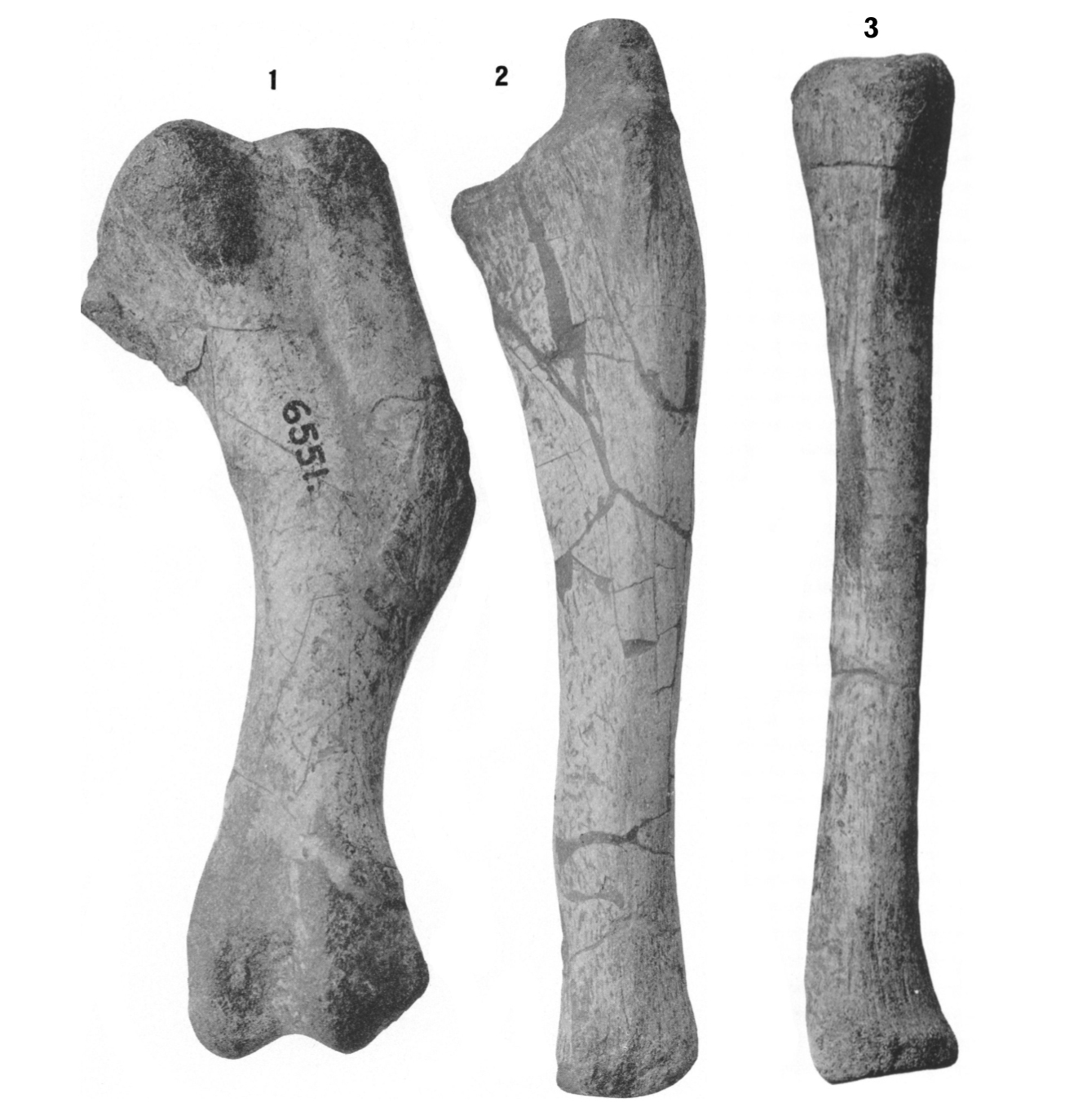
Right humerus (1) of AMNH FARB 30728 and left ulna (2) with radius (3) of AMNH FARB 30729

The pectoral area is represented by both scapulae and coracoids from several specimens as well. In general, the coracoid has an oval-shaped form with a prominent coracoid foramen through which the supracoracoid nerve passes and the glenoid is D-shaped. The bottom articulation is shortened and triangular, as well as directed to the bottom area rather than hooked from the rear to the bottom in a lateral as in many other hadrosauroids and not hadrosaurids. The scapula is very straight in a top view with its inner surface being flattened throughout most of the length. The scapular blade is not particularly elongated and is somewhat rounded at its end which seems to be a common trait in hadrosauroids except for Bactrosaurus. The proximal constriction, the area of the scapula lying between the proximal region and the distal blade, is very narrow; its breadth is about half the width of the proximal region. The putative acromion process is slightly tilted forwards. The deltoid ridge—a ridge-like structure on the humerus where the deltoid muscle is attached—is well developed and extends from the acromion process to the bottom edge of the scapular blade. The coracoid facet is concave and subrectangular shape. The glenoid is concave and more elongated than its width. The humerus is a relatively stocky and robust bone. Its main articular head is expanded from the inner side to the lateral one and proximally offset relative to its proximolateral corner. The deltopectoral crest—where the deltoid muscle was attached to the upper front of the humerus—is developed to the lower side from the upper half of the humerus, and its bottom extension has a total width diameter of the humeral shaft ratio of 1.67. The lateral border of the deltopectoral crest is very thick towards the bottom border. However, as a whole, this crest is relatively shortened in length. In cross-section, the humeral shaft is elliptical in shape and gently flattened to the lateral surface. A large tuberosity can be observed on the posterior surface of the humerus—about 1/3 the distance from the upper end. The lower end of the humerus is expanded to the lateral side forming the ulnar and radial condyles. The ulnar condyle is more wider and expanded than the radial one and these two condyles are separated by a shallow depression on the anterior and posterior surfaces of the lower end of the humerus. The radius is subcylindrical in shape with expanded upper and lower ends. The articulation surfaces of this bone with those of the ulna in AMNH FARB 30729 match perfectly, indicating that they represent the same individual. Both bottom and top surfaces in the radius are triangular and shape but the former is more flattened. The lower end is more expanded than the upper one and is also triangular in cross-section. Additionally, the articular lower surface of the radius is triangular and has striations. The ulna is shortened compared to other hadrosauroids. It is expanded at its upper and lower ends and the dorsal surface of the upper third shows a shallow depression that likely served as the attachment site for the upper end of the radius. The inner surface is very concave in shape. The middle and lower regions of the shaft change from wider to more expanded near the lower end of the ulna. The latter is nearly equal in thickness as the upper end. The lower fifth of the ulna has a flattened articular surface for the radius that faces from the inner to the top facets and shows elongated striations.

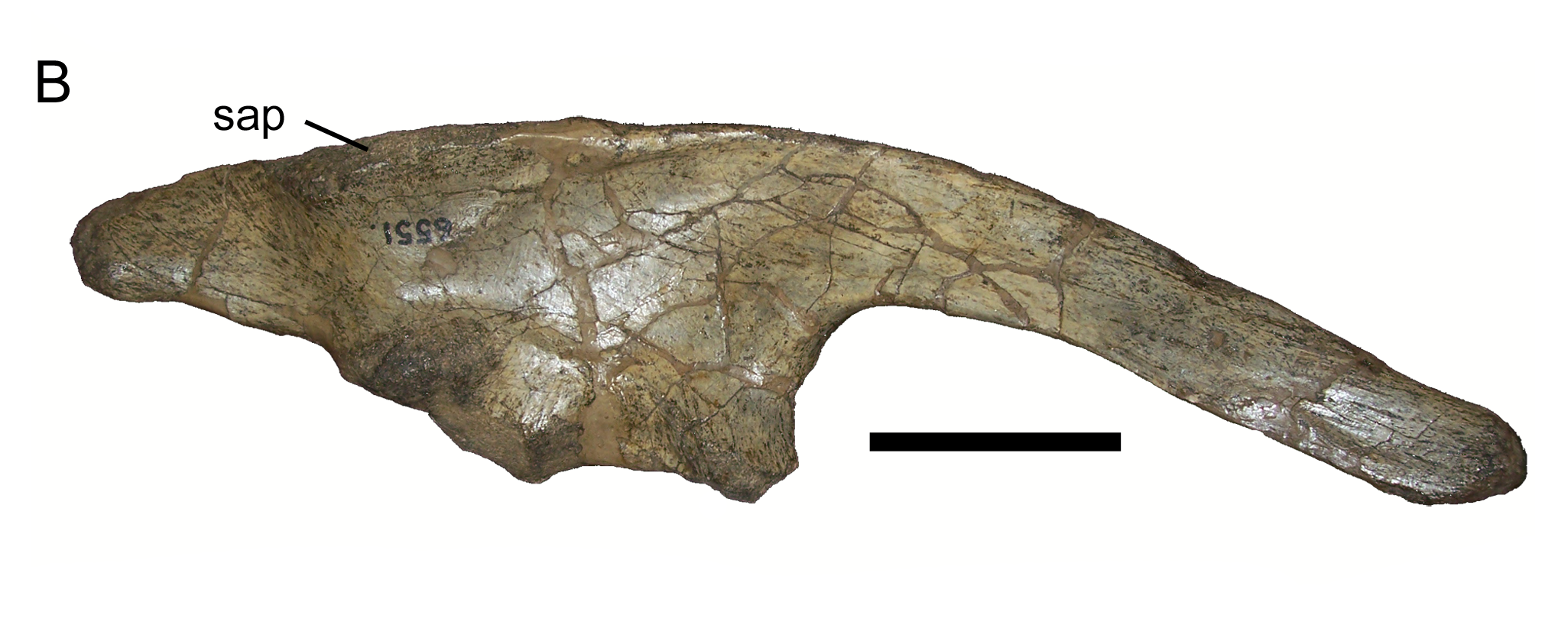
Right ilium of AMNH FARB 30736 in lateral view featuring the supraacetabular process

Though very fragmented, the manus is represented by the left metacarpal IV with two right phalanges. The metacarpal is very short—more so than what is known in other hadrosauroids—and has a gently tilted shape. The upper end is more broad than the lower one and its articular surface is rather round. Phalanx II-1 is fairly elongated and has concave articular surfaces. However, phalanx III-1 is much shorter than the previous elements, having a semi-square shape and being wider than long. Its articular surfaces are more convex. The ilium is elongated and shallow in shape with its preacetabular process (anterior expansion of the iliac blade) also being long and deflected towards the bottom. The upper region of this process is deep. The shape of the top border of the ilium has a degree of variability among specimens. The supraacetabular process (a bony projection at the top border of the ilium) has an asymmetrical, v-shaped appearance in profile and its lateral projection is tilted to the bottom. This process also develops near the upper region of the postacetabular process (posterior expansion of the iliac blade). The pubic peduncle—a robust process in front of the acetabulum—is triangular in shape and expanded from the inner to lateral surfaces. The ischiac peduncle, which is a lesser process located just behind the acetabulum, shows a well-developed tuberosity towards the top surface. When compared, the preacetabular process is much more elongated and developed than the posterior one. The ischium is notoriously elongated and has a wide and robust iliac peduncle—tubercle-like structure that connects to the ilium. Its anterior and posterior borders are gently similar upwards. Being more broad than the iliac peduncle, the pubic peduncle is very flattened from the inner to lateral sides and its articular surface faces towards the bottom. The lower end of the ischium has a characteristic "foot-like" expansion and though its bottom border is eroded, enough is preserved to tell that it was not greatly expanded in this area. There is only a single pubis that has lost most of its areas due to erosion. Both ischial and pubic peduncles are separated by the rounded acetabular border of the pubis. A vast majority of the bone is losing the lower end, however, it is clear this region was not particularly rounded.

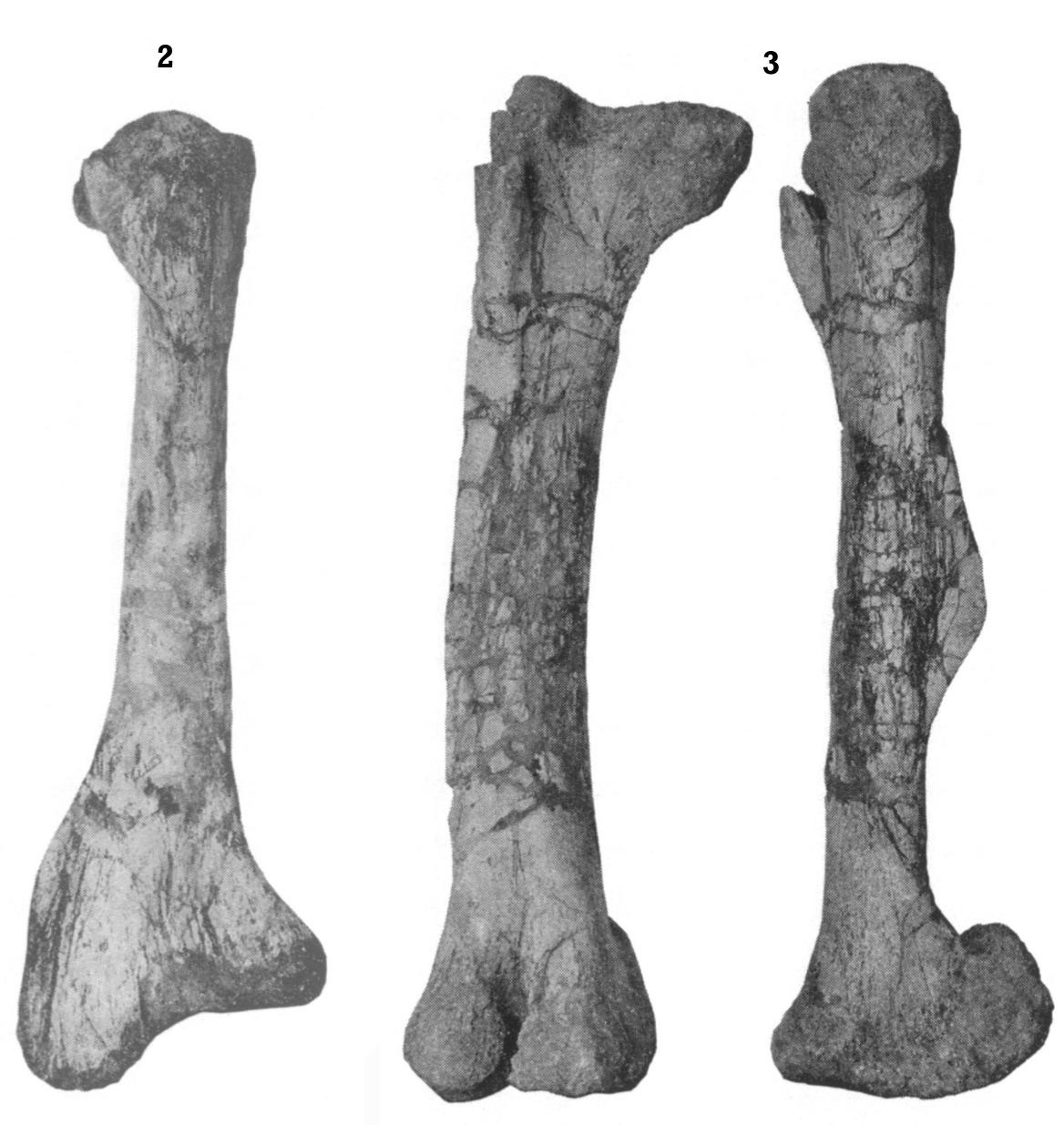
Tibia (2) of AMNH FARB 30742 and femur (3) of AMNH FARB 30741

The femur is a straight and robust element that is gently curved to the inner side. This element is mostly similar in build to other hadrosauroids with a well-developed fourth trochanter and lateral-inner condyles. The latter two are separated by grooves. The anterior trochanter is elongated and large, being forwards offset and excluded from the lateral surface of the upper region of the femur by a fissure. One of the most common elements among the collection is represented by the tibia—about six elements. It is a robust element that is slightly shorter than the femur, and is composed of a rather cylindrical shaft that is expanded at both upper and lower ends; more expanded at the latter though. The cnemial crest is very elongated and developed near the upper end of the bone. A main difference between the juvenile and adult tibiae can be noted by the bottom tilt of the lateral malleolus—this trait is less developed in juveniles. Another character less developed in juveniles is the definition and sharpness of the distal margin of the cnemial crest. Furthermore, the upper inner condyle of the tibia is reduced in juveniles. The fibula is particularly straight and elongated. It is flattened to the lateral side and the upper end is more expanded than the lower one. While the lateral surface is gently convex, the inner one bears a long depression near the upper region. On the lower end, a flat articular surface can be located and is tilted forwards. Among the tarsal elements, the astragalus is the largest. It has an irregular shape with well-developed processes, and the articular surface for the fibula is shallowed. The calcaneum is square in shape and divided into four different surfaces. Among them, the upper surface articulates with the fibula and is separated from the tibial articular surface by a curved ridge-like structure.

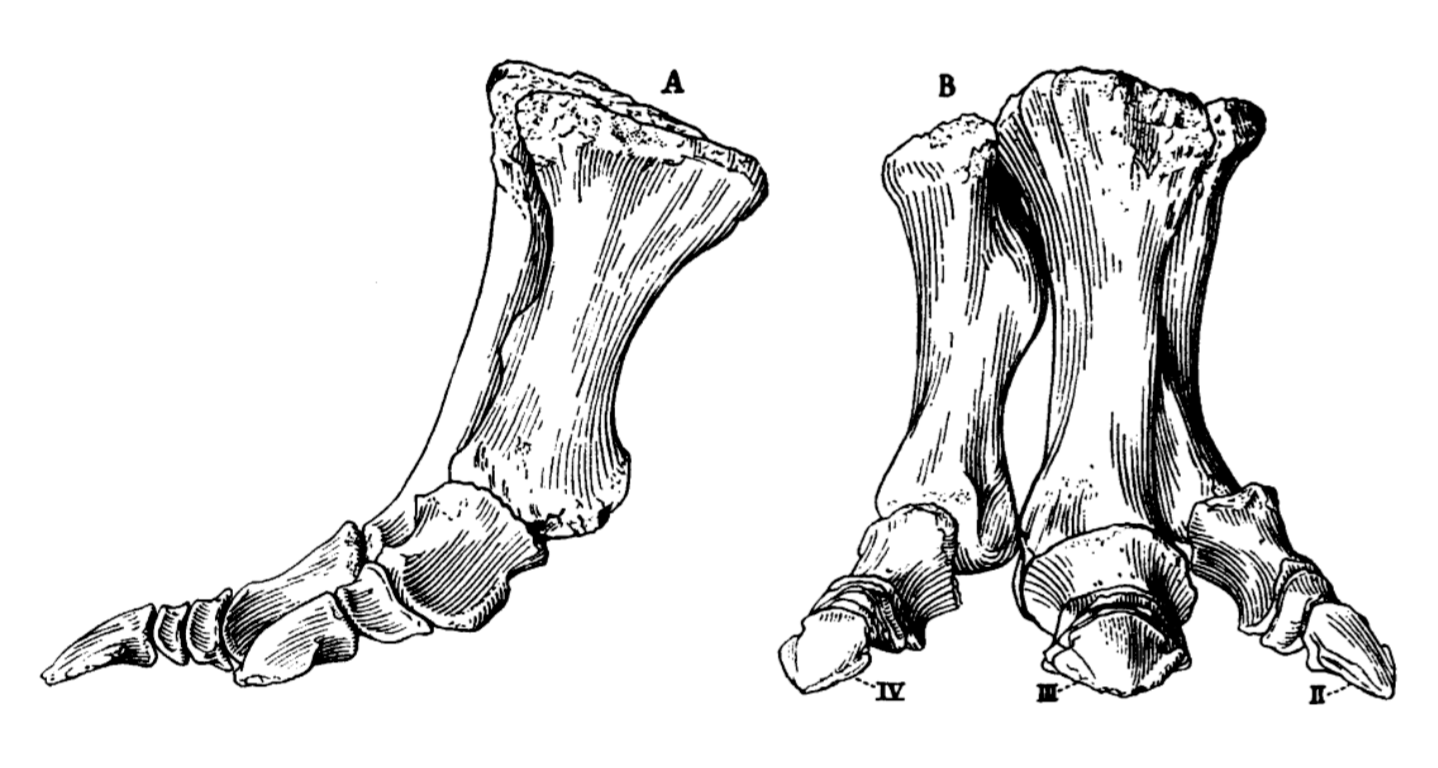
Composite reconstruction of the right pes (several specimens)

Among the metatarsus elements, metatarsal III and IV are present. The former is composed of a rather stocky shaft that has expanded upper and lower ends. Its upper articular surface is D-shaped, and the upper half of the inner surface shows a notorious depression for the articulation with metatarsal II. On the bottom surface of this metatarsal, a large ridge-like structure is present and extends along the upper two-thirds of the element. The lateral and inner surfaces of the lower end of metatarsal III are concave—mostly on the inner one—and subcircular. Metatarsal IV is fairly more slender than the previous element and its shaft is flattened from the top to bottom regions. The upper articular surface is concave and also D-shaped, with equal widened top and bottom borders. The bottom-most surface of the bone is concave and the medial one features a large tuberosity upwards to the mid-length. The lower end is nearly equally in its expansions and the articular surface is downwards convex and less concave to the lateral surface than in metatarsal III. The lateral and inner surfaces of the lower end of metatarsal IV have an oval shape and are very concave. Pedal phalanges II-1 through IV-1 are stout and show triangular-shaped and concave upper surfaces. Among the three uppermost phalanges, II-1 is the deepest. Phalanx III-1 is downwards flattened and has a subelliptical upper articular surface. Pedal phalanx II-2 is a robust element that wider than long. Its upper surface is relatively smooth and concave. The bottom border of this surface is further extended backwards in relation to the top border. Two lower phalanges belong to digit IV. These phalanges are even more flattened than phalanx II-2. Their lower and upper surfaces are similar to those of phalanx II-2, but can be differentiated in being more concave. Pedal unguals are mostly flattened and convex with elliptical upper surfaces. These elements are more arrow-shaped and more sharply developed than in hadrosaurids. The unguals of digits II and IV are asymmetrical, with more elongated inner and lateral flanges, and longer upper regions.

== Classification ==
Although a consensus on the exact taxonomic placement of this genus remains unreached, a 2010 study by Prieto-Márquez and Norell places the animal in a closely related outgroup to Hadrosauridae, based on a reassessment of its taxonomic status using a large-sample phylogenic analysis.

== Paleobiology ==
=== Growth ===
A comprehensive study on the bone microstructure of Asian hadrosauroid dinosaurs, evaluating its implications for the knowledge of growth strategies and evolution of gigantism in hadrosauroids, was published by Slowiak and colleagues in 2020 revealing that several growth strategies facilitated gigantism. Several hadrosaurs were histologically analyzed, including Barsboldia, Gobihadros, Saurolophus and ZPAL MgD-III/2-17, an indeterminate second species of hadrosauroid present in the Bayan Shireh Formation. The latter was slightly smaller than Gobihadros as seen on the developed external fundamental system (tightly spaced LAGs that indicate adulthood) on the tibia. This hadrosauroid however, shares several traits with Gilmoreosaurus—most likely due to the proximities of both Bayan Shireh and Iren Dabasu formations—and the phylogenetic analyses performed recovered both hadrosaur species in a polytomy along with Lophorhothon and the indeterminate hadrosauroid. This analysis suggests similar growth size and rates in these species. Slowiak and colleagues noted that the growth trend within the Hadrosauroidea featured two important adaptations of bone microstructure similar to those of Eusauropoda. The first important adaptation was the decrease of secondary remodelling in the tibia, allowing the bone to bear higher tensions. This feature is thought to represent a biomechanical response to their increasing body-size evolution since the center of mass was concentrated on the pelvic area and therefore supported by well-developed hindlimbs. This explains the slender forelimbs in most hadrosaurs. A second adaptation was the disappearance of lines of arrested growth (LAGs). This feature, also reported in giant sauropods, allowed uninterrupted growth during ontogeny.

=== Paleopathology ===
In 2003, Rothschild and colleagues performed analyses in search for pathologies in several dinosaur specimens. Evidence of tumors, including hemangiomas, desmoplastic fibroma, metastatic cancer, and osteoblastoma were discovered in numerous specimens of Gilmoreosaurus by analyzing them through computerized tomography and fluoroscope screening. Several other hadrosaurids, including Brachylophosaurus, Edmontosaurus, and Bactrosaurus also tested positive. Although more than 10000 fossils were examined in this manner, the tumors were limited to Gilmoreosaurus and other hadrosaurs. The tumors were only found on caudal vertebrae and they may have been caused by environmental factors, such as the way in which these hadrosaurs interacted with their environments, making them more susceptible to get cancer, or, through genetic inheritance. Meaning that they carried cancer-promoting genes.

In 2007, Rothschild and Tanke reported the increased presence of osteochondrosis in hadrosaurs. Though they examined several other dinosaur groups, this disease appears to be particularly common in hadrosaurs, which were rapidly growing animals. The analysis was focused in pedal bones since osteochondrosis has not been reported from manual elements. Specimens of Edmontosaurus and Hypacrosaurus were more affected by osteochondrosis (5% and 2% of occurrence, respectively) but in hadrosauroids like Gilmoreosaurus and Bactrosaurus the disease was rather absent, likely due to the relatively low sample and therefore the presence of osteochondrosis in all hadrosaurs can not be discarded. These findings indicate that the skeleton of dinosaurs was primarily formed by cartilage.

== Paleoenvironment ==
Gilmoreosaurus is known from the Late Cretaceous Iren Dabasu Formation, which has been dated back to the Cenomanian stage around 95.8 ± 6.2 million years ago. During its times, the formation was dominated by braided floodplains and large meanders with some connections to the oceans. Extensive vegetation that maintained a great variety of herbivorous dinosaurs was also present on the formation as seen on the multiple skeletons of hadrosauroids, the prominent paleosol and the numerous palynological occurrences.

Hadrosauroid remains are very common across the formation, which reflect these animals as wide-ranging in both time and space. Bactrosaurus is another hadrosauroid from the formation, known from multiple specimens like Gilmoreosaurus. Ponderous herbivorous animals like Gilmoreosaurus and Bactrosaurus may have been medium to low-level browsers. Fellow herbivores include the therizinosaurids Erliansaurus and Neimongosaurus. Gigantoraptor, a large oviraptorosaur from the formation, may have been an omnivore as suggested by the mandibular morphology or at least, a partial high-browser. The geographic range of Gilmoreosaurus overlapped with the fast-running tyrannosauroid Alectrosaurus, likely being the prey item for this theropod.

== See also ==
- Timeline of hadrosaur research
