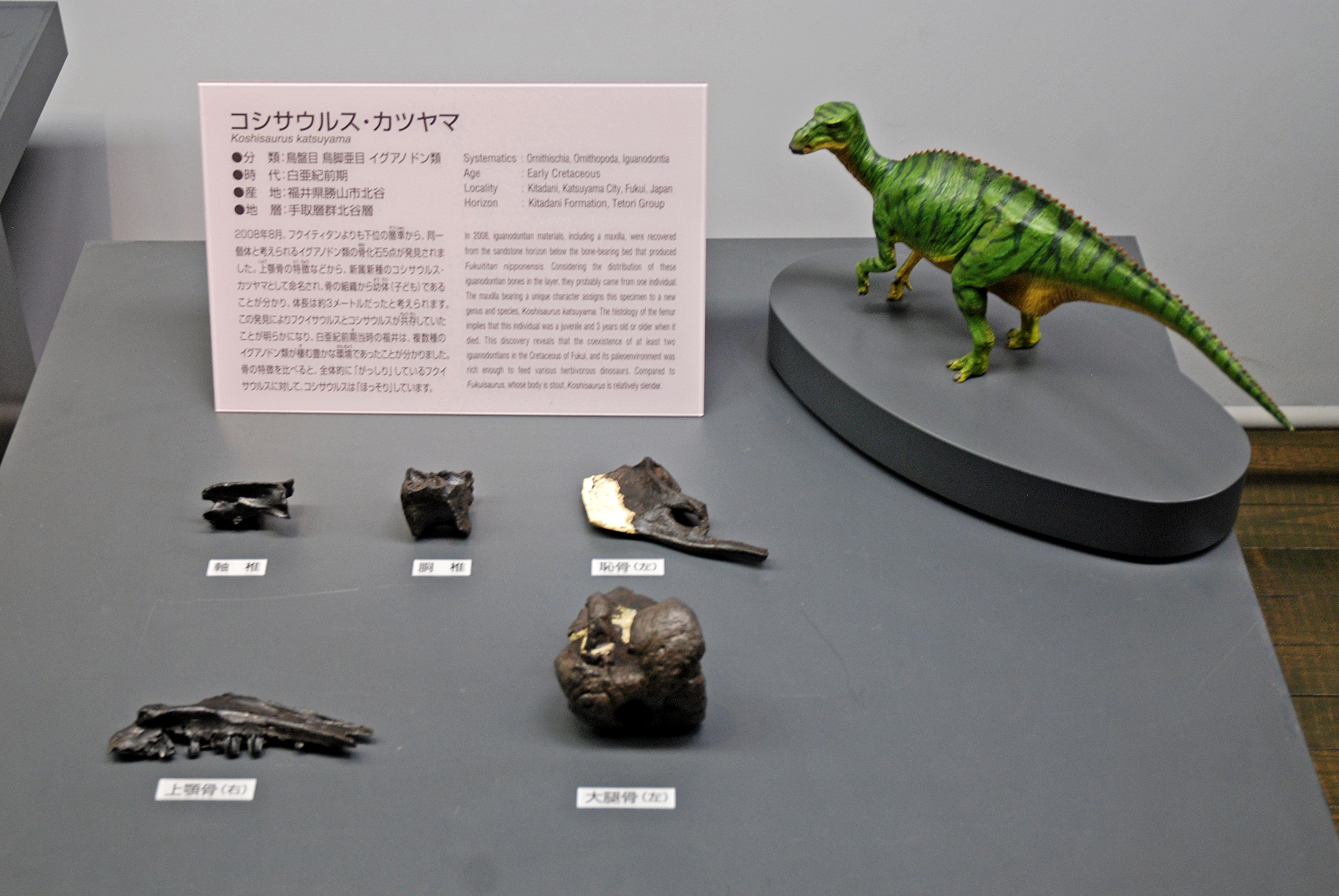
- Fossil elements and model

Scientific classification
- Domain: Eukaryota
- Kingdom: Animalia
- Phylum: Chordata
- Clade: Dinosauria
- Clade: †Ornithischia
- Clade: †Ornithopoda
- Superfamily: †Hadrosauroidea
- Genus: †Koshisaurus; Shibata and Azuma, 2015

Type species
- †Koshisaurus katsuyama Shibata and Azuma, 2015

= Koshisaurus =

Koshisaurus Temporal range: Early Cretaceous, 125–115 Ma

Extinct genus of reptiles

Koshisaurus is a monospecific genus of basal hadrosauroid from the Kitadani Formation in Japan. The discovery of the genus suggests that hadrosauroids had higher diversity along the eastern margin of Asia in the Early Cretaceous. "Koshi" means an old Japanese regional name including Fukui prefecture where fossils of the genus were discovered.

== Description ==
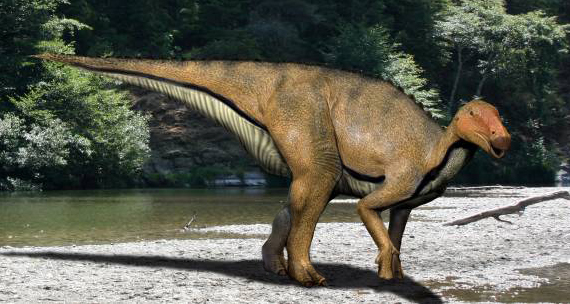
Restoration

Koshisaurus was unlike most hadrosauroids due to the fact that it possessed an antorbital fossa, as well as three subsidiary ridges on its maxillary teeth, similar to those of Equijubus. These ridges are also present on the also Asian genera Xuwulong, Jinzhousaurus and Altirhinus; but all three lack antorbital fossae, placing them as more advanced than Koshisaurus.

== See also ==
- Timeline of hadrosaur research
