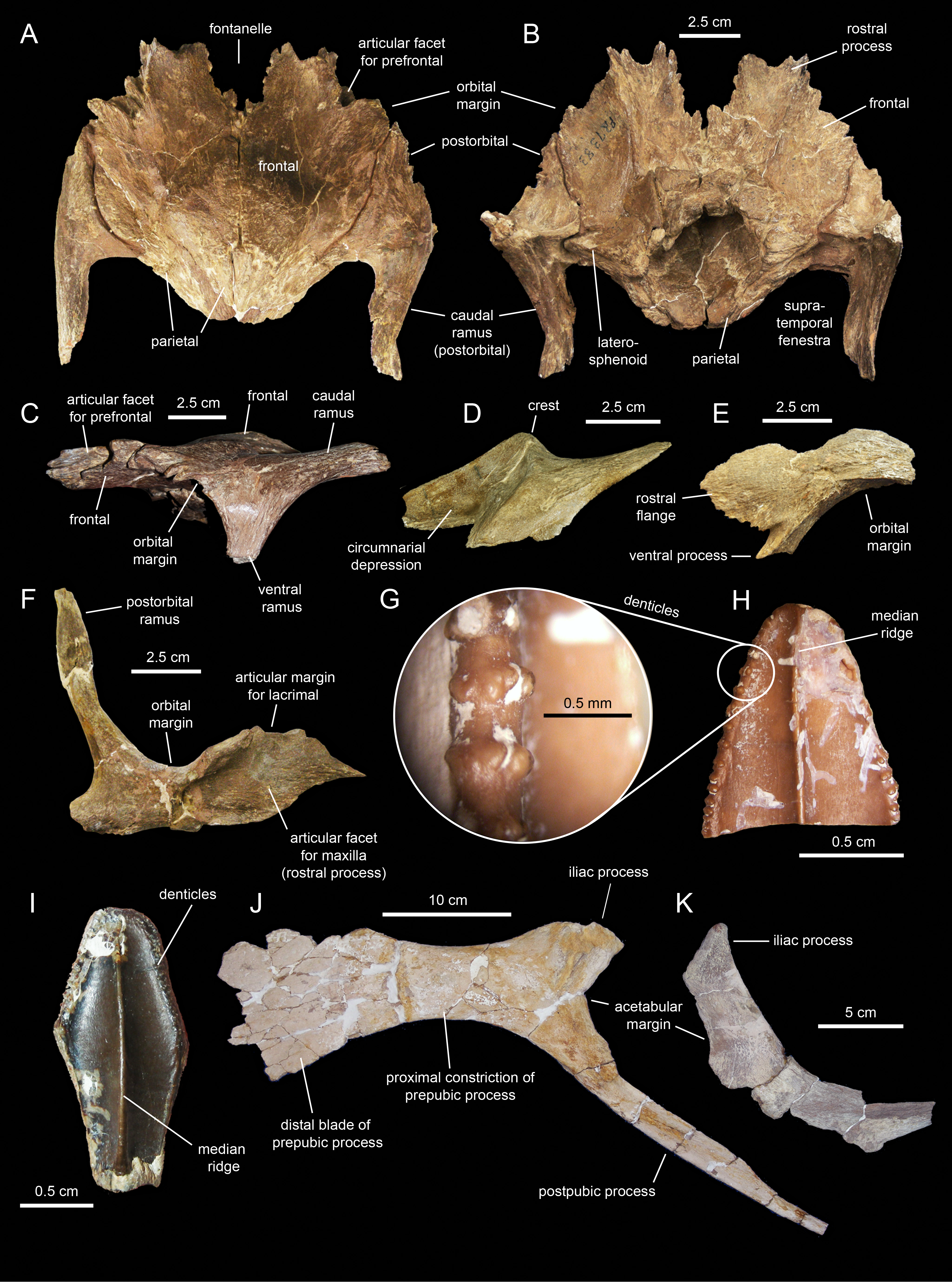
- Skeletal elements

Scientific classification
- Kingdom: Animalia
- Phylum: Chordata
- Class: Reptilia
- Clade: Dinosauria
- Clade: †Ornithischia
- Clade: †Ornithopoda
- Clade: †Hadrosauromorpha
- Genus: †Lophorhothon; Langston, 1960

Type species
- †Lophorhothon atopus Langston, 1960

= Lophorhothon =

Lophorhothon Temporal range: Late Cretaceous, ~80 Ma

Genus of dinosaur

Lophorhothon is a genus of hadrosauroid dinosaur from the Late Cretaceous of Alabama, and possibly Georgia and North Carolina. It was the first dinosaur genus discovered in Alabama, in the United States.

== Discovery and naming ==
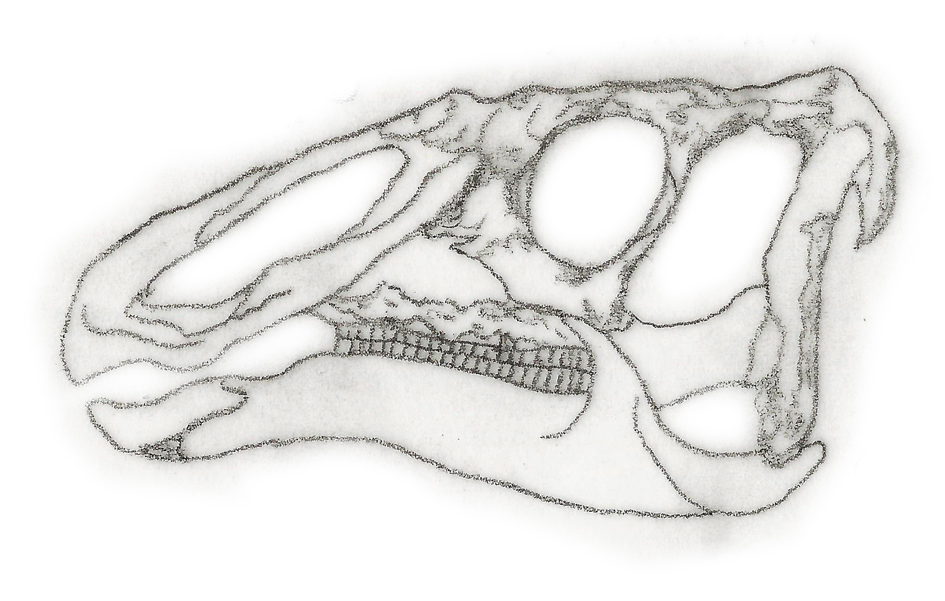
Reconstruction of the skull

Remains of a small, poorly known perhaps saurolophine dinosaur were first discovered during the 1940s, from extensive erosional outcrops of the lower unnamed member of the Mooreville Chalk Formation (Selma Group; lower and middle Campanian) in Dallas County, west of the town of Selma, Alabama. The taxon has since also been reported from Black Creek Formation (Campanian) of North Carolina. The holotype, which is housed in the collections of the Field Museum in Chicago, consists of a fragmentary and disarticulated skull and incomplete postcranial skeleton. The length of the holotype specimen has been estimated as 4.5 metres (14 ft 9 in), which is small for a hadrosaur, but the original specimen is of a juvenile. The adults may have been larger, probably as large as Hadrosaurus, Hypsibema, Kritosaurus, and Gryposaurus. The genus was named by Wann Langston in 1960. It was thought to be the only species of hadrosaur from that fossil formation, until 2016 with the discovery of the primitive hadrosaur, Eotrachodon orientalis. The name Lophorhothon means "crested nose" (Greek lophos meaning 'crested' and rhothon meaning 'nose'). The type species is Lophorhothon atopus. The specific name is derived from Greek atopos, "uncommon" or "strange".

The specimen which Langston designated as the holotype was discovered by Rainier Zangerl, Bill Turnbull and Charles Barber on a Field Museum expedition in 1946 and was given catalogue number FMNH P 27383. It consists of less than one half of the skull, a number of vertebrae, and significant portions of the fore- and hindlimbs. Preserved cranial material includes a partial quadrate, left maxilla, teeth, jugal, lacrimal, nasal (with the namesake crest), postorbital, frontal, prefrontal, parietal, squamosal, and paroccipital process and a portion of the predentary bone. The specimen was likely washed out to sea by a river, where it eventually sank and was buried in the silty carbonate sediments of the Mississippi embayment.

In 2021, a more complete specimen was unearthed in Alabama.

== Classification ==
Since the publication of Langston's description of Lophorhothon a number of workers have questioned the validity of this genus. It has been suggested, for example, that the material may actually represent a juvenile Prosaurolophus. James Lamb in 1998 has suggested the genus may actually represent a basal iguanodont, an idea that has failed to find widespread acceptance. More recent workers (Horner, Weishampel, and Forster, 2004) have classified Lophorhothon as a basal hadrosaurine and a sister taxon to all other hadrosaurines. An analysis published in 2010 indicated it was a basal member of the Hadrosauroidea.

In 2021, new material from Alabama was unearthed not too far from where the original holotype was unearthed. This find cemented its status as a valid genus of hadrosauromorph.

== See also ==
- Timeline of hadrosaur research

== Sources ==
- Horner, J. R., Weishampel, D. B., and Forster, C. A. 2004. Chapter Twenty: Hadrosauridae. in The Dinosauria (2nd edition), Weishampel, D. B., Dodson, P., and Osmólska, H., editors. University of California Press.
- Lamb, J. P. 1998. Lophorothon, an iguanodontian, not a hadrosaur. Journal of Vertebrate Paleontology, 18 (3 Abstracts): 59A.
- Langston, W. 1960. The vertebrate fauna of the Selma Formation of Alabama, part VI: the dinosaurs. Fieldiana: Geology Memoirs 3(5): 315–359.
- Schwimmer, D. R. 1997. Late Cretaceous dinosaurs in eastern USA: a taphonomic and biogeographic model of occurrences, p. 203–211. In D. L. Wolberg, E. Stump, and G. D. Rosenberg (eds.), Dinofest International. The Academy of Natural Sciences, Philadelphia.
- Thurmond, J. T. and Jones, D. E. 1981. Fossil vertebrates of Alabama. University of Alabama Press.
