= Levnesovia =

Levnesovia Temporal range: Late Cretaceous, Turonian

Scientific classification
- Kingdom: Animalia
- Phylum: Chordata
- Class: Reptilia
- Clade: Dinosauria
- Clade: †Ornithischia
- Clade: †Ornithopoda
- Genus: †Levnesovia; Sues and Averianov, 2009
- Species: †L. transoxiana

Binomial name
- †Levnesovia transoxiana Sues and Averianov, 2009

Extinct genus of dinosaurs

Levnesovia is a genus of hadrosauroid dinosaur from the Late Cretaceous (Turonian) Bissekty Formation of Uzbekistan. It was related to Bactrosaurus. The type species is L. transoxiana. The genus name honours the late Russian paleontologist Lev Nessov, and the specific name refers to the ancient region Transoxiana. It is known from partial skulls, maxillae, dentaries and numerous bones of the postcranial skeleton.

== See also ==
- Timeline of hadrosaur research
