= Batyrosaurus =

Batyrosaurus Temporal range: Late Cretaceous, 84 Ma

Scientific classification
- Kingdom: Animalia
- Phylum: Chordata
- Class: Reptilia
- Clade: Dinosauria
- Clade: †Ornithischia
- Clade: †Ornithopoda
- Superfamily: †Hadrosauroidea
- Genus: †Batyrosaurus; Godefroit et al., 2012

Type species
- †Batyrosaurus rozhdestvenskyi Godefroit et al., 2012

Extinct genus of dinosaurs

Batyrosaurus is an extinct genus of herbivorous basal hadrosauroid dinosaur known from the Late Cretaceous Bostobe Formation (Santonian to Campanian stage) of central Kazakhstan. It contains a single species, Batyrosaurus rozhdestvenskyi. It is possible that Batyrosaurus represents the same taxon as the doubtful Arstanosaurus akkurganensis as both were found from the same formation.

The type species Batyrosaurus rozhdestvenskyi was in 2012 named and described by Pascal Godefroit, François Escuillié, Yuri Bolotsky and Pascaline Lauters. The generic name is derived from the Batyr, the Kazakh hero warriors. The specific name honours Anatoly Konstantinovich Rozhdestvensky.

The holotype, AEHM 4/1, was found near Akkurgan in a layer of the Bostobinskaya Formation dating from the Santonian-Campanian, about eighty-four millions year old. It consists of a partial skeleton, including a partial skull, the lower jaws, sixty individual teeth, the sterna, the right humerus, the left radius, metacarpals and phalanges. The authors considered Arstanosaurus akkurganensis a nomen dubium and did not refer its material.

Batyrosaurus is a medium-sized hadrosauroid of about five to six metres length. Several autapomorphies, unique derived traits, were established. The parietal bones at their rear form bony flaps that overlap the supraoccipital but do not touch the sides of the paraoccipitals and are themselves overlapped by the squamosals. The frontal bones are elongated, about 70% longer than wide. The outer side of the front branch of the jugal shows a deep horizontal trough below the suture with the lacrimal. The joint surface of the surangular is pierced by a foramen.

Among the material found was an about four centimetres long thumb claw. A cast was made of the braincase, showing fine arterial impressions on its inner surface, indicating it was almost completely filled by brain tissue.

A cladistic analysis showed that Batyrosaurus had a basal position in the Hadrosauroidea, above Altirhinus but below Probactrosaurus in the evolutionary tree. As Tethyshadros in their analysis was a hadrosaurid, the authors considered Batyrosaurus to be the youngest known non-hadrosaurid hadrosauroid. This was seen as an indication that not only hadrosauroids but also hadrosaurids originally developed in Asia and only later migrated to North-America.

== See also ==
- Timeline of hadrosaur research
