= Jinzhousaurus =

Jinzhousaurus Temporal range: Early Cretaceous (Barremian) 124.12 Ma
- Skeletal mount, Chaoyang Paleontological Museum

Scientific classification
- Kingdom: Animalia
- Phylum: Chordata
- Class: Reptilia
- Clade: Dinosauria
- Clade: †Ornithischia
- Clade: †Ornithopoda
- Superfamily: †Hadrosauroidea
- Genus: †Jinzhousaurus; Wang & Xu, 2001

Type species
- Jinzhousaurus yangi Wang & Xu, 2001

Extinct genus of dinosaurs

Jinzhousaurus is a genus of hadrosauroid dinosaur of the Early Cretaceous of China. The type species is Jinzhousaurus yangi. The generic name refers to the town Jinzhou. The specific name honours Yang Zhongjian is the founder of Chinese paleontology. It was first described by Wang Xiao-lin and Xu Xing in 2001.

== Discovery ==
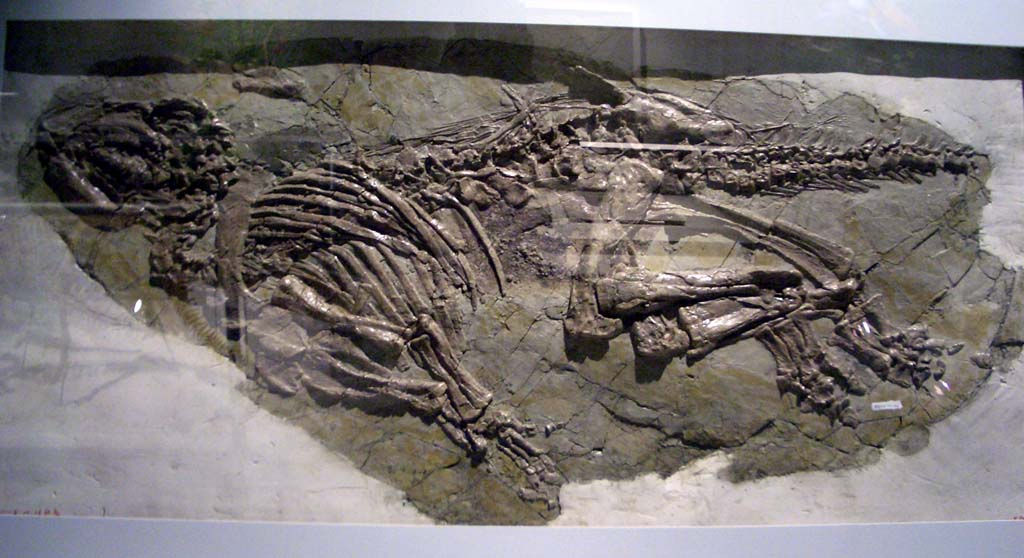
Fossil skeleton, Hong Kong Science Museum

Its fossil, holotype IVPP V12691, was found near Baicaigou in Yixian County in the Dawangzhangzi Beds of the Yixian Formation in Liaoning, China, having an oldest determinable age of 122 million years, during the early Aptian stage of the early Cretaceous Period. It consists of a nearly complete skeleton, compressed on a slab.

== Description ==
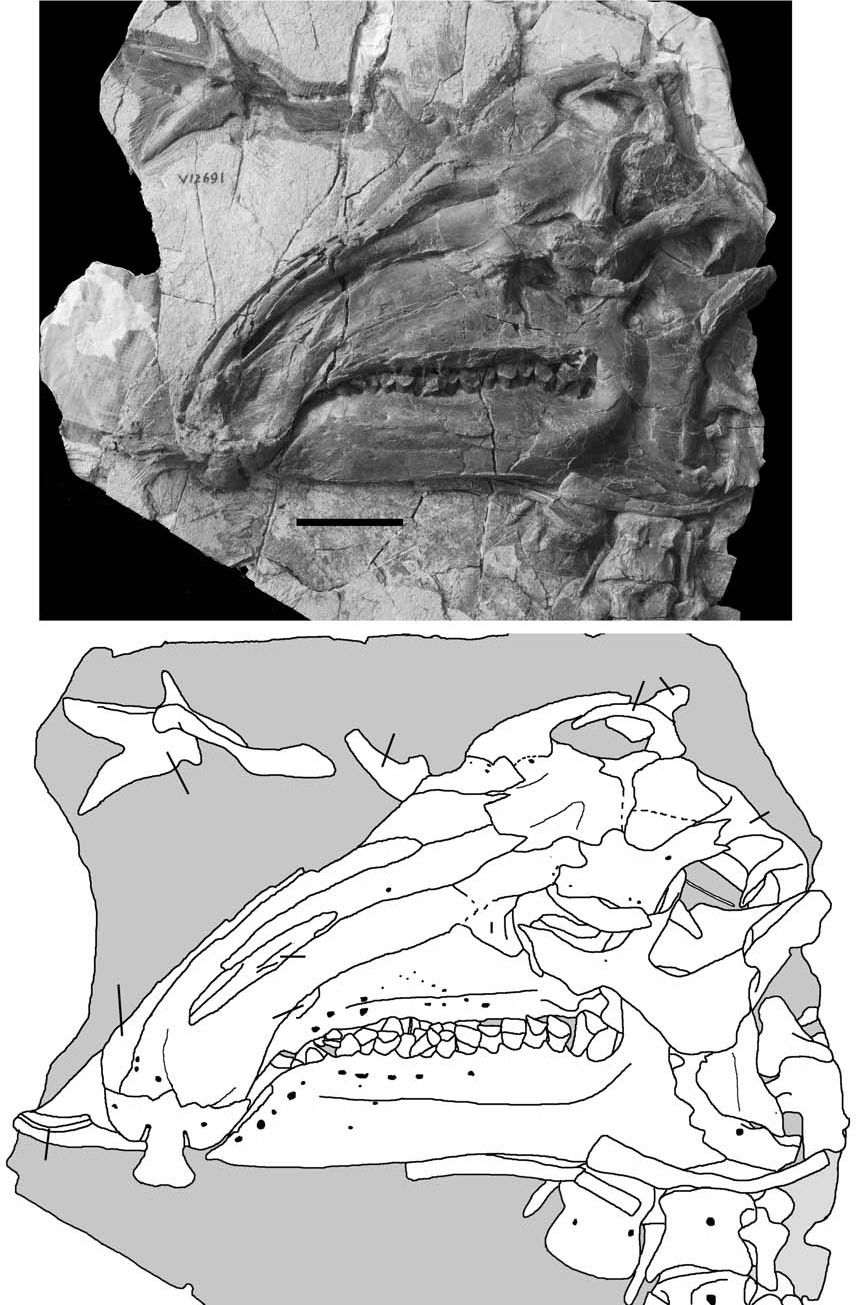
Skull of the holotype

Jinzhousaurus has a length of about 7 metres (23 ft) and its skull is about half a metre long. Its snout was elongated with large nares and lacking an antorbital fenestra. The back of the skull was uncommonly wide with a small crest on top. The dentary of the lower jaw has at least seventeen tooth positions.

== Classification ==
Jinzhousaurus shows a mix of basal and derived features. Originally assigned to (an already understood to be paraphyletic) Iguanodontidae, later authors have referred it to the more general Iguanodontoidea. In 2010 a study concluded it was within this group a basal member of the more derived, Hadrosauroidea.
