= 1946 in paleontology =

Paleontology or palaeontology is the study of prehistoric life forms on Earth through the examination of plant and animal fossils. This includes the study of body fossils, tracks (ichnites), burrows, cast-off parts, fossilised feces (coprolites), palynomorphs and chemical residues. Because humans have encountered fossils for millennia, paleontology has a long history both before and after becoming formalized as a science. This article records significant discoveries and events related to paleontology that occurred or were published in the year 1946.

== Dinosaurs ==
Name	Novelty	Status	Authors	Age	Type locality	Location	Notes	Images
Orthomerus weberi	Sp. nov.	Valid	Riabinin	Maastrichtian	Unnamed, Crimea	Ukraine	A species of Orthomerus now named Riabininohadros	

== Charophytes ==
=== Trochiliscales ===
Name	Novelty	Status	Authors	Age	Unit	Location	Synonymized taxa	Notes	Images
Trochiliscus greeni	Comb & syn nov		(Ulrich) Brown	Devonian	Onondaga Limestone	USA; Indiana	Trochiliscus devonicus (1934)	A trochiliscaceous Charophycean green algae. Moved from Moellerina greeni (1886)	

== Mollusca ==
=== Bivalves ===
Name	Novelty	Status	Authors	Age	Unit	Location	Notes	Images
Ctenodonta spjeldnaesi.	Sp nov	synonym	Reed	Ashgillian		Scotland	transferred to Similodonta in 1964	
Nucula magna.	Sp nov	synonym	Lamont	Ashgillian		Scotland	transferred to Similodonta in 1964	
