= Timeline of hadrosaur research =

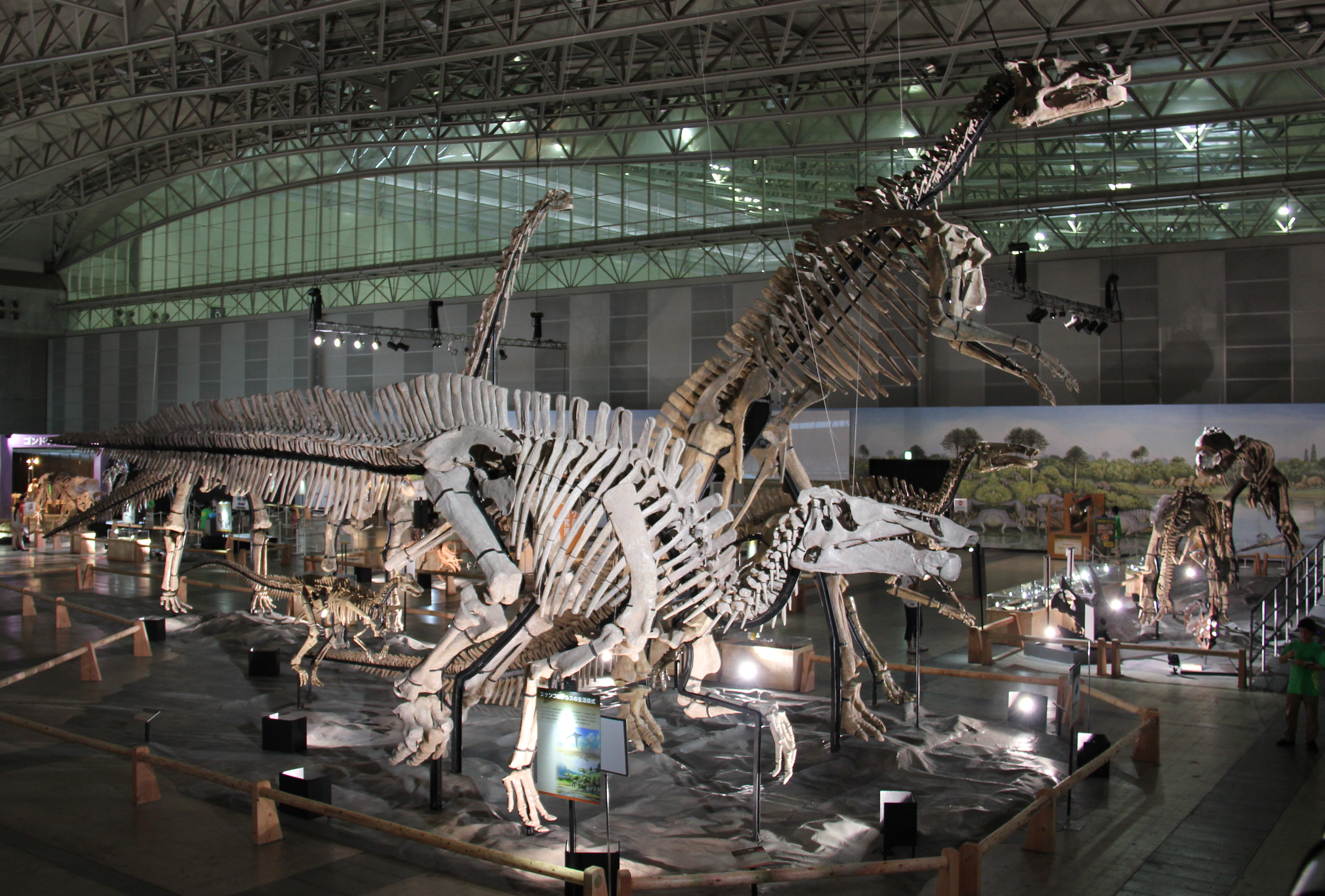
Skeletal mounts of Shantungosaurus giganteus

This timeline of hadrosaur research is a chronological listing of events in the history of paleontology focused on the hadrosauroids, a group of herbivorous ornithopod dinosaurs popularly known as the duck-billed dinosaurs. Scientific research on hadrosaurs began in the 1850s, when Joseph Leidy described the genera Thespesius and Trachodon based on scrappy fossils discovered in the western United States. Just two years later he published a description of the much better-preserved remains of an animal from New Jersey that he named Hadrosaurus.

The early 20th century saw such a boom in hadrosaur discoveries and research that paleontologists' knowledge of these dinosaurs "increased by virtually an order of magnitude" according to a 2004 review by Horner, Weishampel, and Forster. This period is known as the great North American Dinosaur rush because of the research and excavation efforts of paleontologists like Brown, Gilmore, Lambe, Parks, and the Sternbergs. Major discoveries included the variety of cranial ornamentation among hadrosaurs as scientist came to characterize uncrested, solid crested, and hollow crested species. Notable new taxa included Saurolophus, Corythosaurus, Edmontosaurus, and Lambeosaurus. In 1942 Richard Swann Lull and Wright published what Horner, Weishampel, and Forster characterized as the "first important synthesis of hadrosaurid anatomy and phylogeny".

More recent discoveries include gigantic hadrosaurs like Shantungosaurus giganteus from China. At 15 meters in length and nearly 16 metric tons in weight it is the largest known hadrosaur and is known from a nearly complete skeleton.

Hadrosaur research has continued to remain active even into the new millennium. In 2000, Horner and others found that hatchling Maiasaura grew to adult body sizes at a rate more like a mammal's than a reptile. That same year, Case and others reported the discovery of hadrosaur bones in Vega Island, Antarctica. After decades of such dedicated research, hadrosaurs have become one of the best understood group of dinosaurs.

== 19th century ==
=== 1850s ===
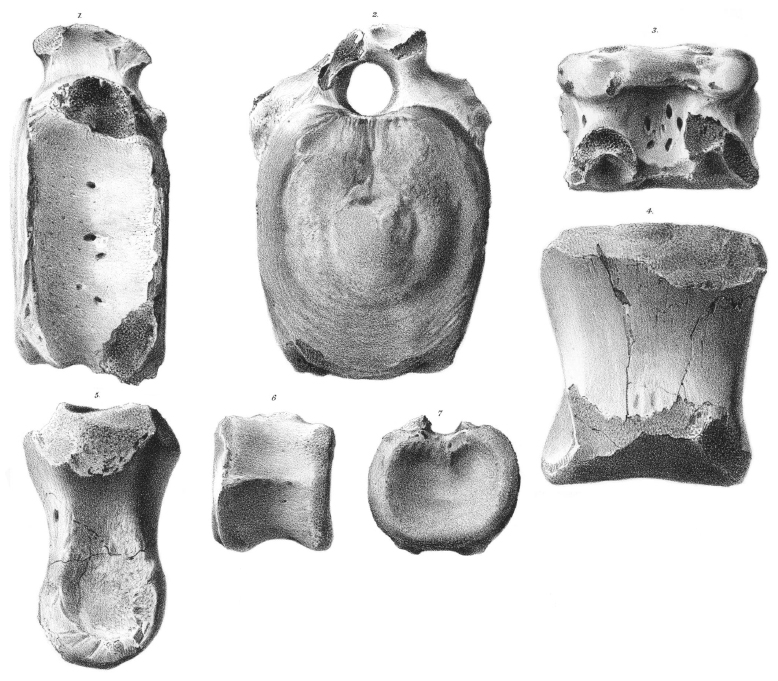
Illustration of the Thespesius syntype

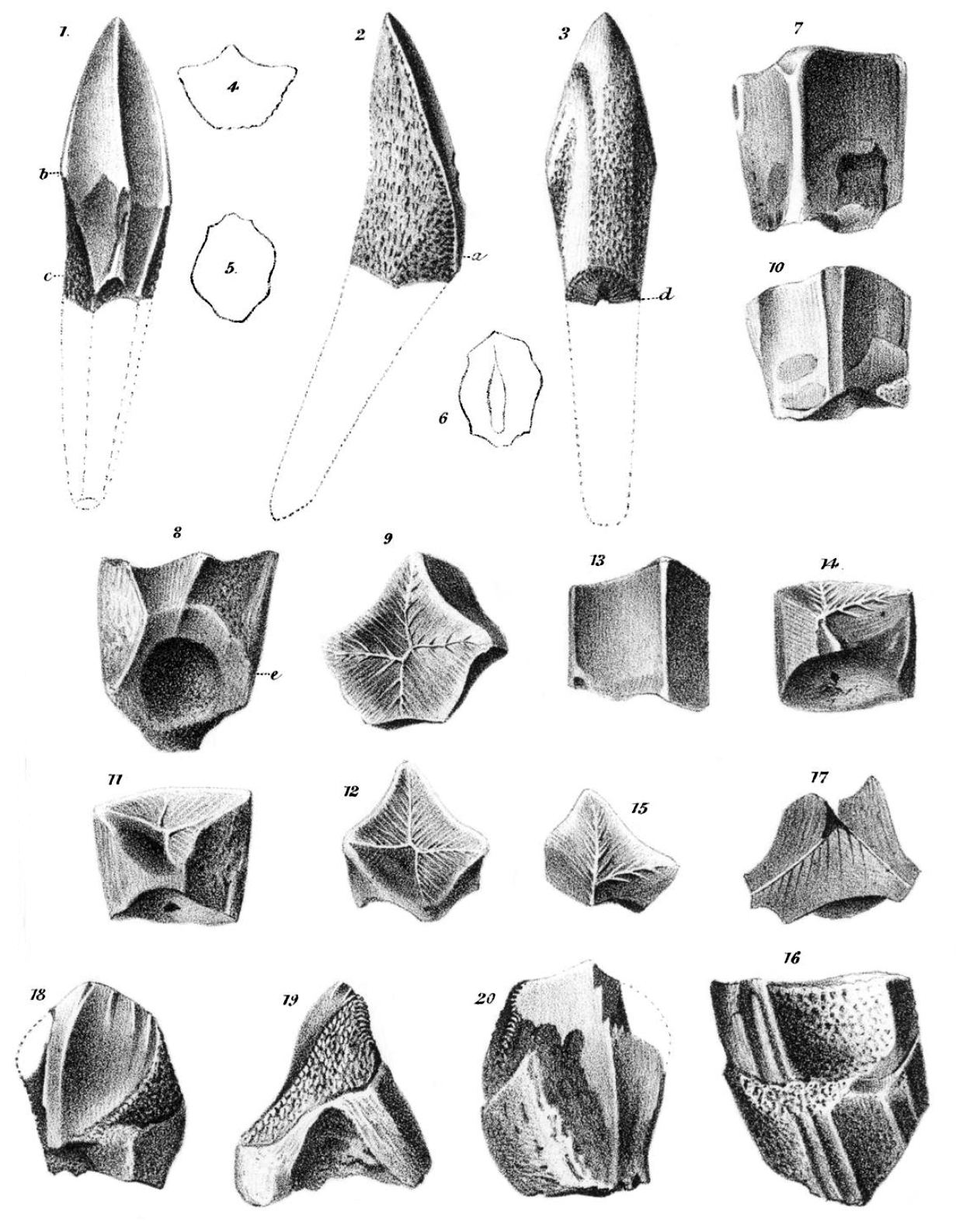
Illustration of Trachodon teeth

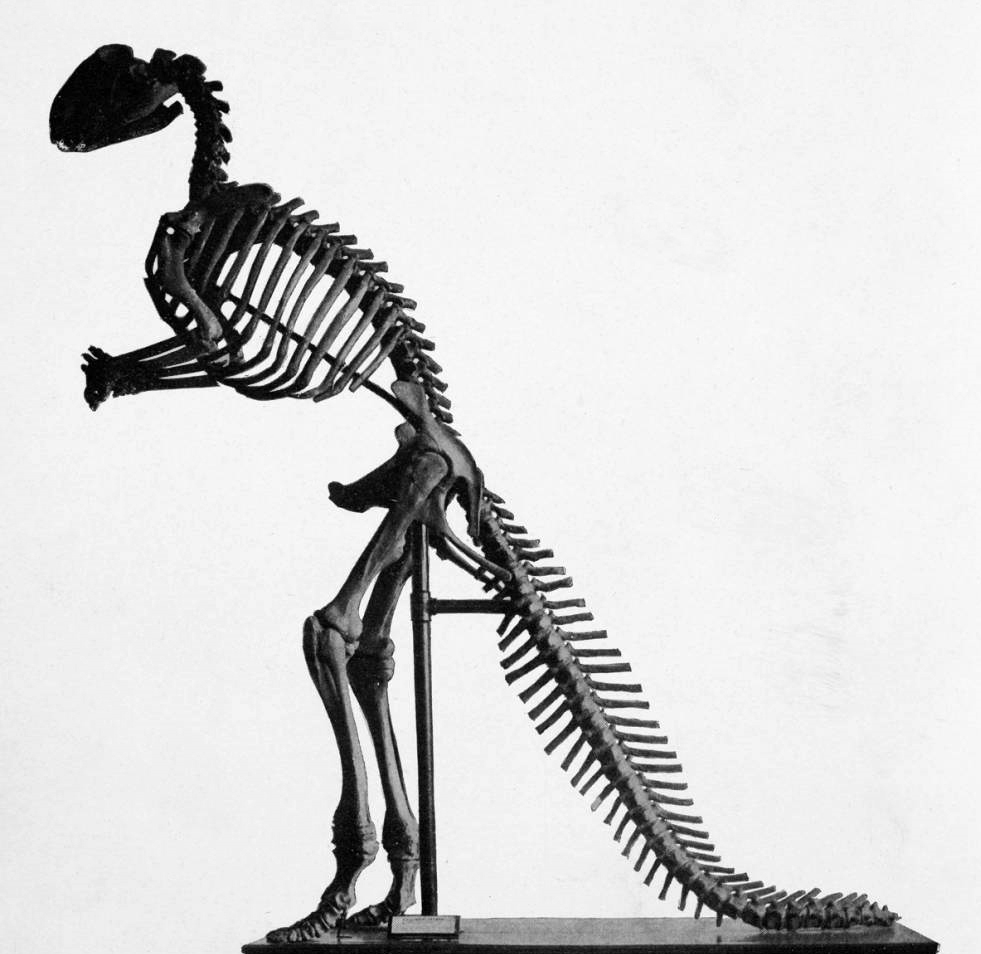
The first mounted dinosaur skeleton, that of Hadrosaurus

==== 1856 ====
- Joseph Leidy described the new genus and species Thespesius occidentalis. He also described the new genus and species Trachodon mirabilis. Although both species were based on poorly preserved material, this paper was the first to be published on hadrosaurid dinosaurs.

==== 1858 ====
- Leidy described the new genus and species Hadrosaurus foulkii. He thought it was an amphibious animal.

=== 1860s ===
==== 1868 ====
- Leidy collaborated with artist Benjamin Waterhouse Hawkins to mount Hadrosaurus foulkii for the Academy of Natural Sciences of Philadelphia. This became both the first mounted dinosaur skeleton ever mounted for public display and also one of the most popular exhibits in the history of the academy. Estimates have the Hadrosaurus exhibit as increasing the number of visitors by up to 50%.

==== 1869 ====
- Edward Drinker Cope described the new genus and species Hypsibema crassicauda.
- Cope named the Hadrosauridae. He observed that the primary distinguishing trait of the group was their dental battery.
- Cope described the new genus and species Ornithotarsus immanis.

=== 1870s ===
==== 1870 ====
- Othniel Charles Marsh described the new species Hadrosaurus minor.

==== 1871 ====
- Cope described the new species Hadrosaurus cavatus.

==== 1872 ====
- Marsh described the new species Hadrosaurus agilis.

==== 1874 ====
- Cope described the new species Agathaumas milo. He also described the new genus and species Cionodon arctatus.

==== 1875 ====
- Cope described the new species Cionodon stenopsis.

==== 1876 ====
- Cope described the new genus and species Diclonius calamarius. He also described the new species Diclonius pentagonus, Diclonius perangulatus, and Dysganus encaustus.

=== 1880s ===
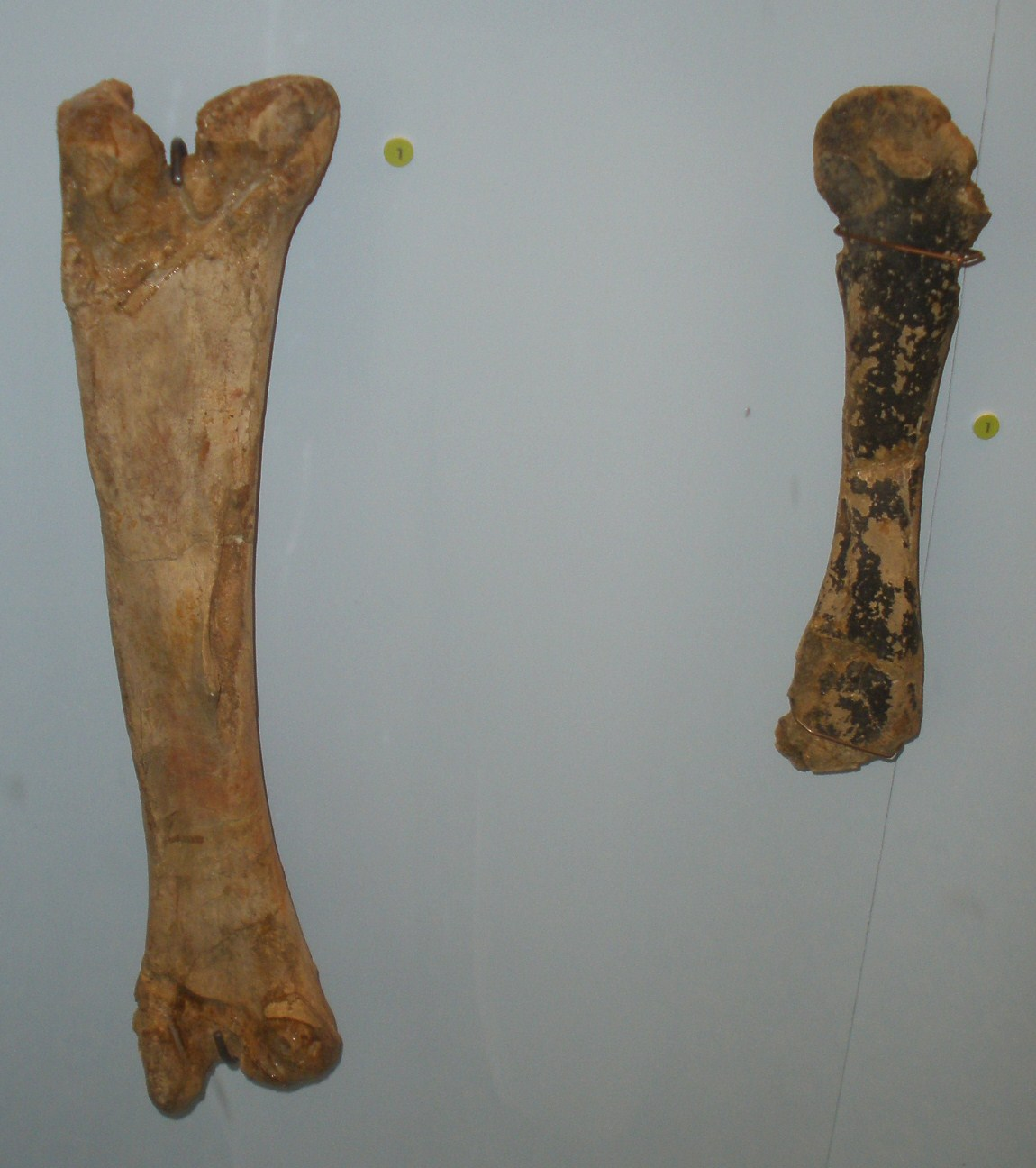
Orthomerus dolloi limb bones

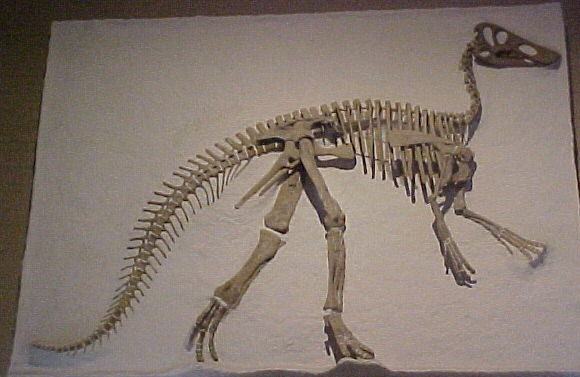
Type specimen of Claosaurus

==== 1883 ====
- Harry Govier Seeley described the new genus and species Orthomerus dolloi.
- Cope still regarded hadrosaurs as amphibious.

==== 1888 ====
- Richard Lydekker described the new species Trachodon cantabrigiensis.

==== 1889 ====
- Marsh described the new species Hadrosaurus breviceps. He also described the new species Hadrosaurus paucidens.
- Cope described the new genus and species Pteropelyx grallipes.

=== 1890s ===
==== 1890 ====
- Marsh erected the new genus Claosaurus to house the species Hadrosaurus agilis. He also described the new species Trachodon longiceps.

==== 1892 ====
- Marsh described the new species Claosaurus annectens.
- Cope described the new genus and species Claorhynchus trihedrus.
- Newton described the new species Iguanodon hilli.

== 20th century ==
=== 1900s ===
==== 1900 ====
- Franz Nopcsa described the new genus and species Limnosaurus transsylvanicus.

==== 1902 ====
- Lawrence Lambe described the new genus and species Trachodon altidens; in the same volume, he suggested the name Didanodon for the same species, but the validity of this name has been questioned. He also described the new species Trachodon marginatus. He also described the new species Trachodon selwyni.

==== 1903 ====
- Nopcsa erected the new genus Telmatosaurus to house the species Limnosaurus transsylvanicus, as the latter genus name was preoccupied .
- George Wieland described the new species Claosaurus affinis.

=== 1910 ===
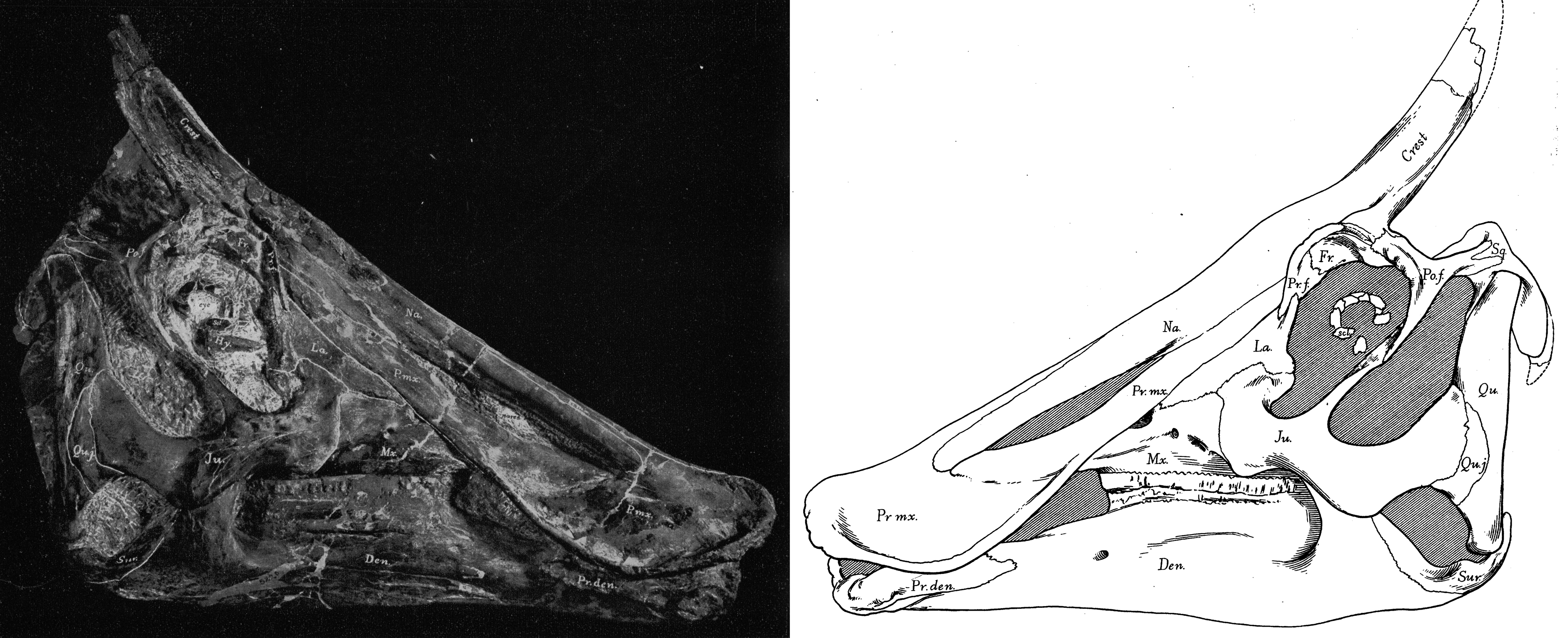
Skull of the Saurolophus osborni holotype

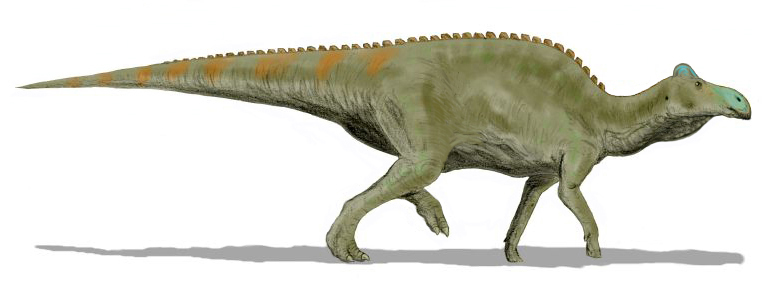
Artist's restoration of Edmontosaurus regalis

==== 1910 ====
- Barnum Brown described the new genus Hecatasaurus. He also described the new genus and species Kritosaurus navajovius.

==== 1912 ====
- Brown described the new genus and species Saurolophus osborni.

==== 1913 ====
- Brown described the new genus and species Hypacrosaurus altispinus.
- Cutler excavated a juvenile Gryposaurus now catalogued by the Canadian Museum of Nature as CMN 8784. The site of the excavation has since been designated "quarry 252".
- Winter: Cutler partly prepared the young Gryposaurus specimen, possibly in Calgary while working on dinosaurs for Euston Sisely.

==== 1914 ====
- Brown described the new genus and species Corythosaurus casuarius.
- Lambe described the new genus and species Gryposaurus notabilis.

==== 1915 ====
- Charles H. Sternberg's crew excavated a Corythosaurus from quarry 243 in Dinosaur Provincial Park, Alberta, Canada. The specimen would later be displayed at the Calgary Zoo.
- Matthew observed that fossils of hadrosaur eggs and hatchlings were absent in coastal areas and suggested that hadrosaurs may have preferred nesting grounds further inland. He believed that these inland nesting grounds were actually where hadrosaurs first evolved and therefore to breed, hadrosaurs retraced their ancestors route back to their place of origin. After hatching, the young hadrosaurs would spend some time inland maturing before migrating out to more coastal areas.

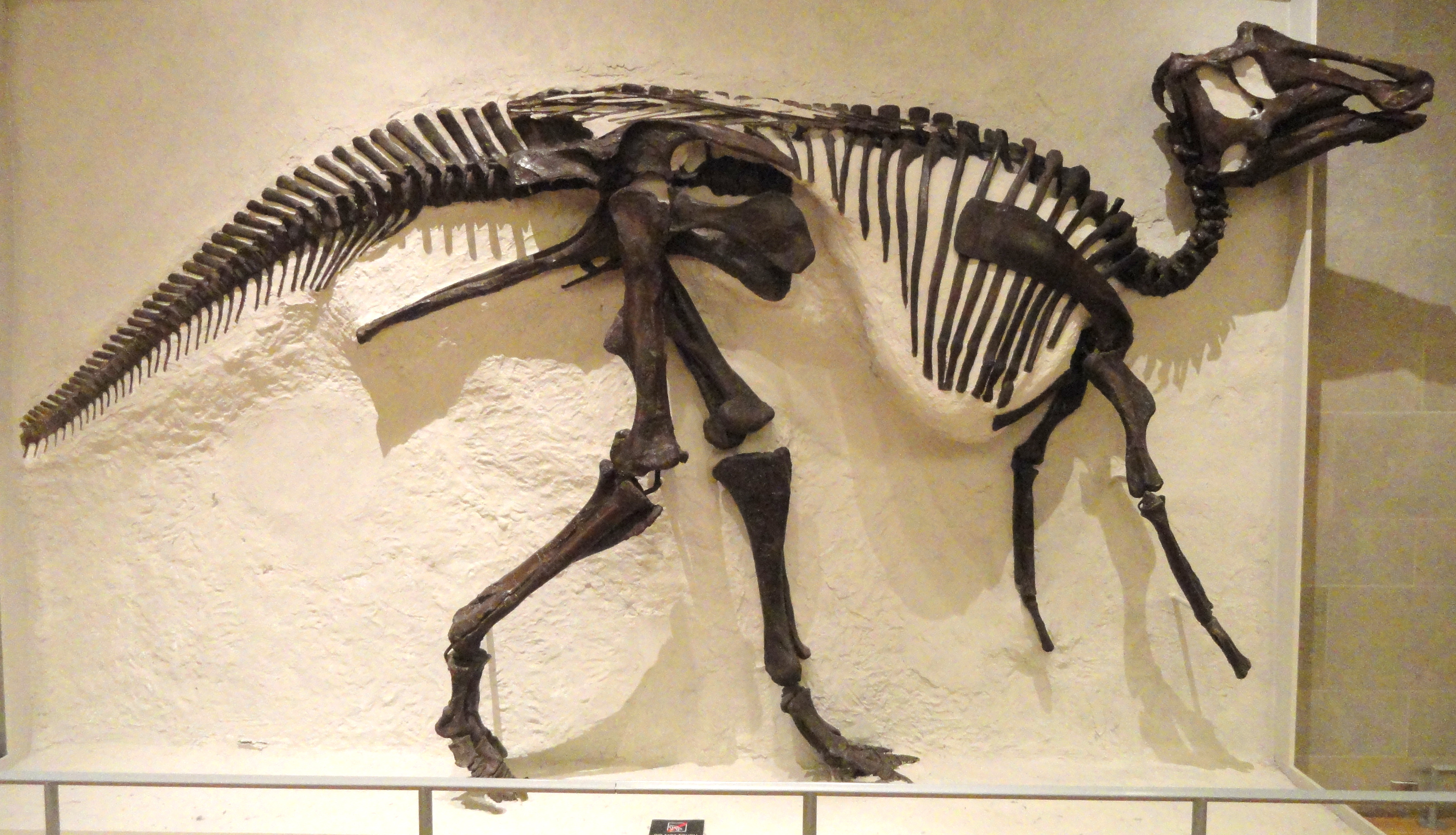
Prosaurolophus maximus specimen collected 1921, Royal Ontario Museum

==== 1916 ====
- Brown described the new genus and species Prosaurolophus maximus.

==== 1917 ====
- Lambe described the new genus and species Edmontosaurus regalis.
- Lambe described the new genus and species Cheneosaurus tolmanensis.

==== 1918 ====
- Lambe named the Hadrosaurinae.

=== 1920s ===
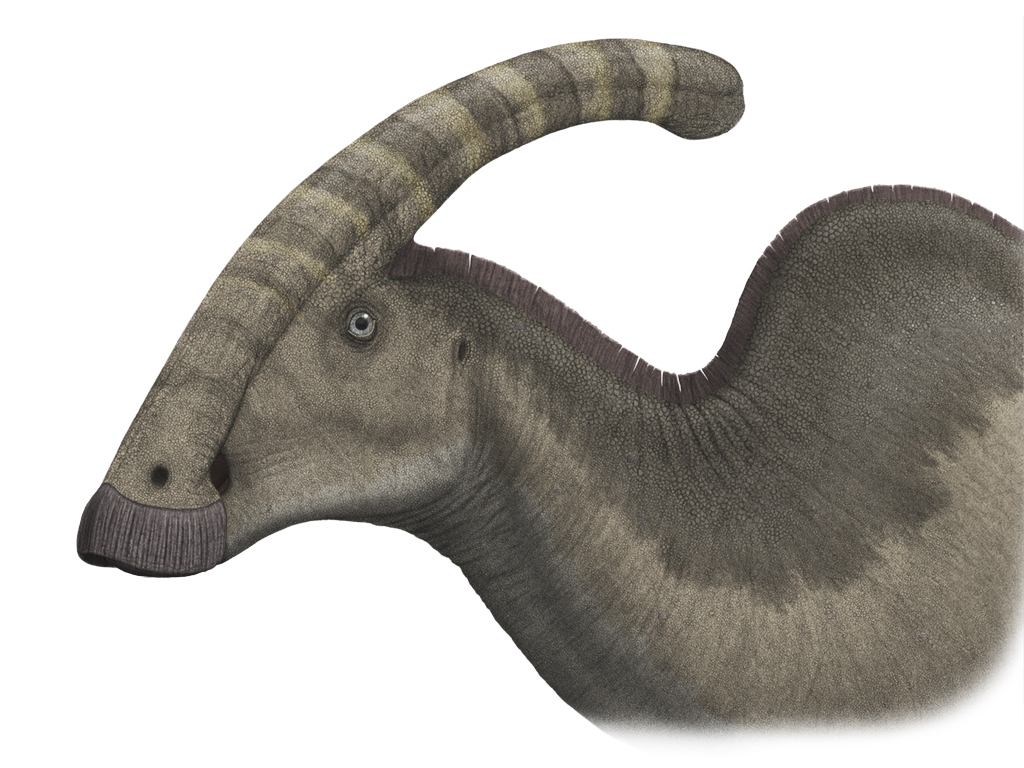
Artist's restoration of Parasaurolophus

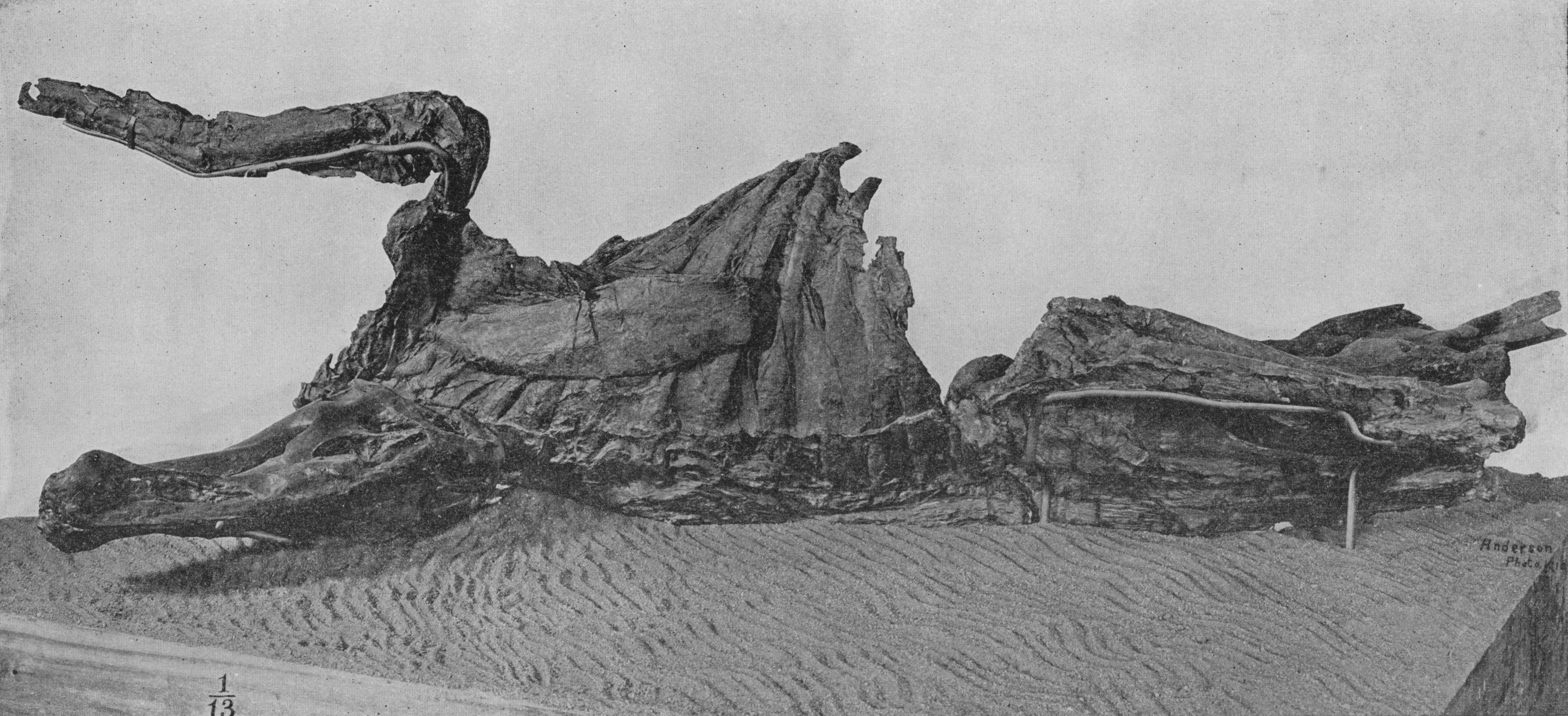
Mummified Edmontosaurus annectens

==== 1920 ====
- Matthew described the new genus Procheneosaurus.
- Parks described the new species Kritosaurus incurvimanus.

==== 1922 ====
- William Parks described the new genus and species Parasaurolophus walkeri.
- Krausel reported fossil gut contents from an Edmontosaurus annectens mummy. He described the material as including conifer needles and branches, deciduous foliage, and possible small seeds or fruit.
- Abel argued that the plant material Krausel argues was the fossilized remains of the gut contents of an Edmontosaurus annectens was actually deposited by flowing water.

==== 1923 ====
- Charles Whitney Gilmore described the new species Corythosaurus excavatus.
- Parks described the new species Corythosaurus intermedius. He also described the new genus and species Lambeosaurus lambei.

==== 1924 ====
- Gilmore described the new species Thespesius edmontonensis.

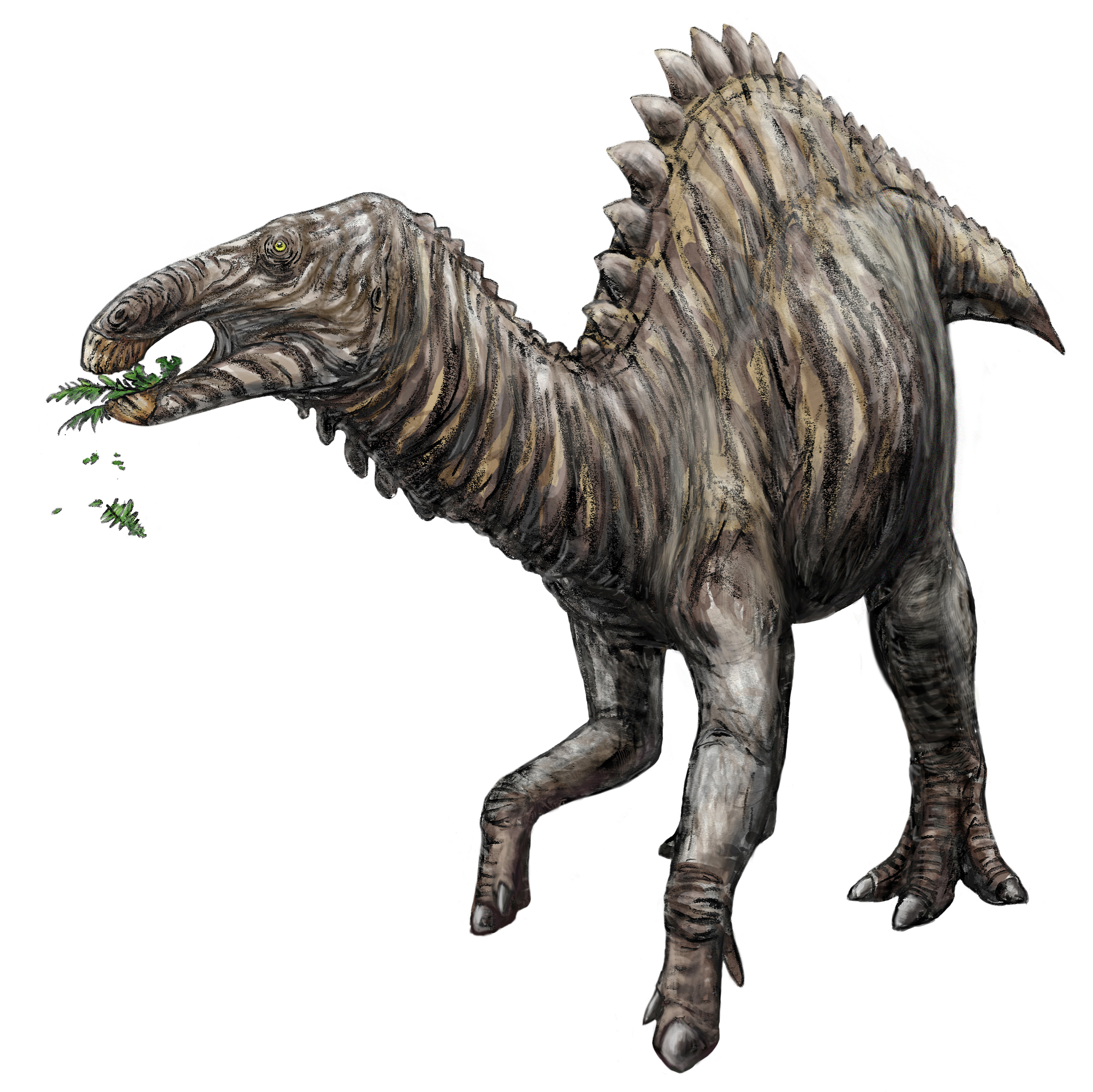
Artist's restoration of Tanius

==== 1925 ====
- Riabinin described the new species Trachodon amurensis.

==== 1926 ====
- Sternberg described the new species Thespesius saskatchewanensis.

==== 1929 ====
- Wiman described the new genus and species Tanius sinensis.

=== 1930s ===
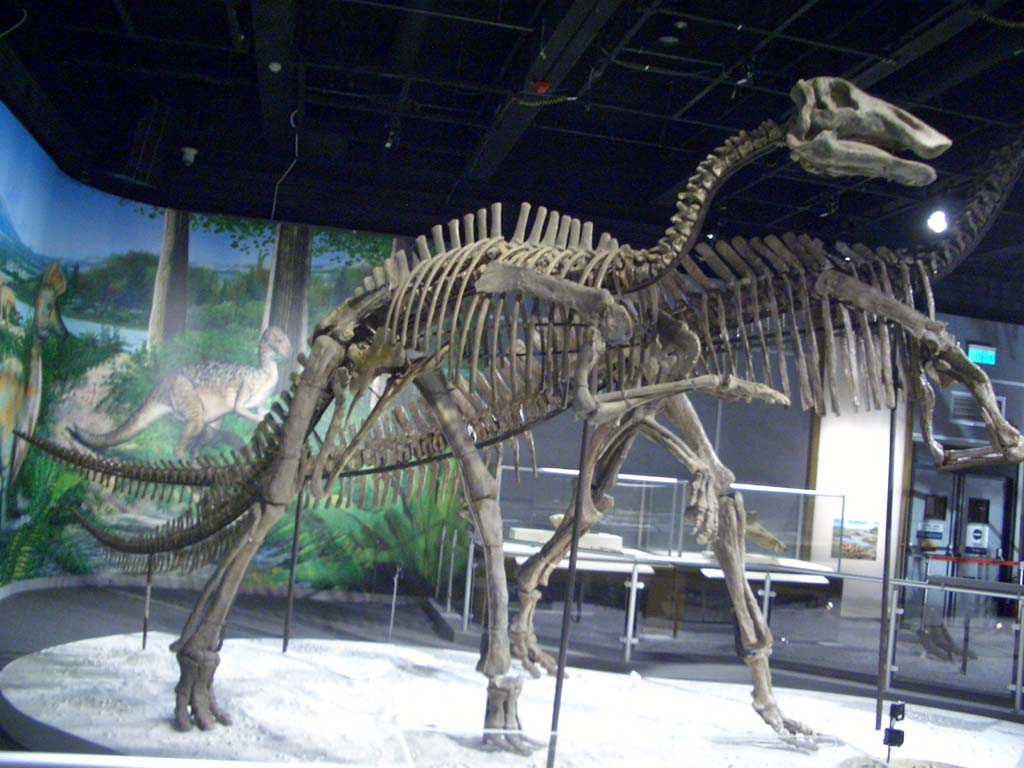
Skeletal mount of Bactrosaurus

==== 1930 ====
- Riabinin described the new species Saurolophus kryschtofovici.
- Riabinin erected the new genus Mandschurosaurus to house the species Trachodon amurensis.

==== 1931 ====
- Parks described the new genus and species Tetragonosaurus erectofrons. He also described the new species Tetragonosaurus praeceps.
- Wiman described the new species Parasaurolophus tubicen.
- Riabinin described the new genus and species Cionodon kysylkumensis.

==== 1933 ====
- Gilmore described the new genus and species Bactrosaurus johnsoni. He also described the new species Mandschurosaurus mongoliensis.
- Parks described the new species Corythosaurus bicristatus and C. brevicristatus.

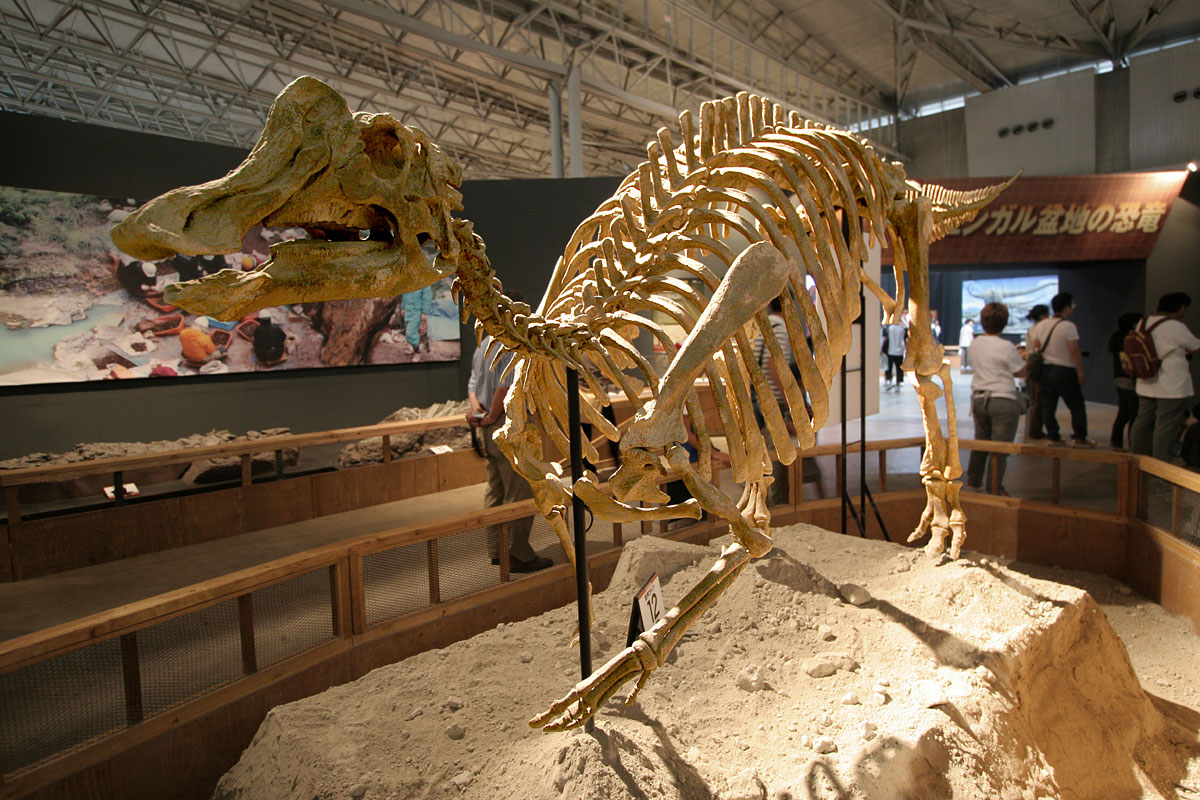
Skeletal mount of Nipponosaurus

==== 1935 ====
- Sternberg described the new species Tetragonosaurus cranibrevis. He also described the new species Lambeosaurus clavinitialis and L. magnicristatus.
- Parks described the new species Corythosaurus frontalis.

==== 1936 ====
- Takumi Nagao described the new genus and species Nipponosaurus sachalinensis.

==== 1939 ====
- Riabinin described the new genus and species Jaxartosaurus aralensis. He also described the new species Bactrosaurus prynadai.

=== 1940s ===
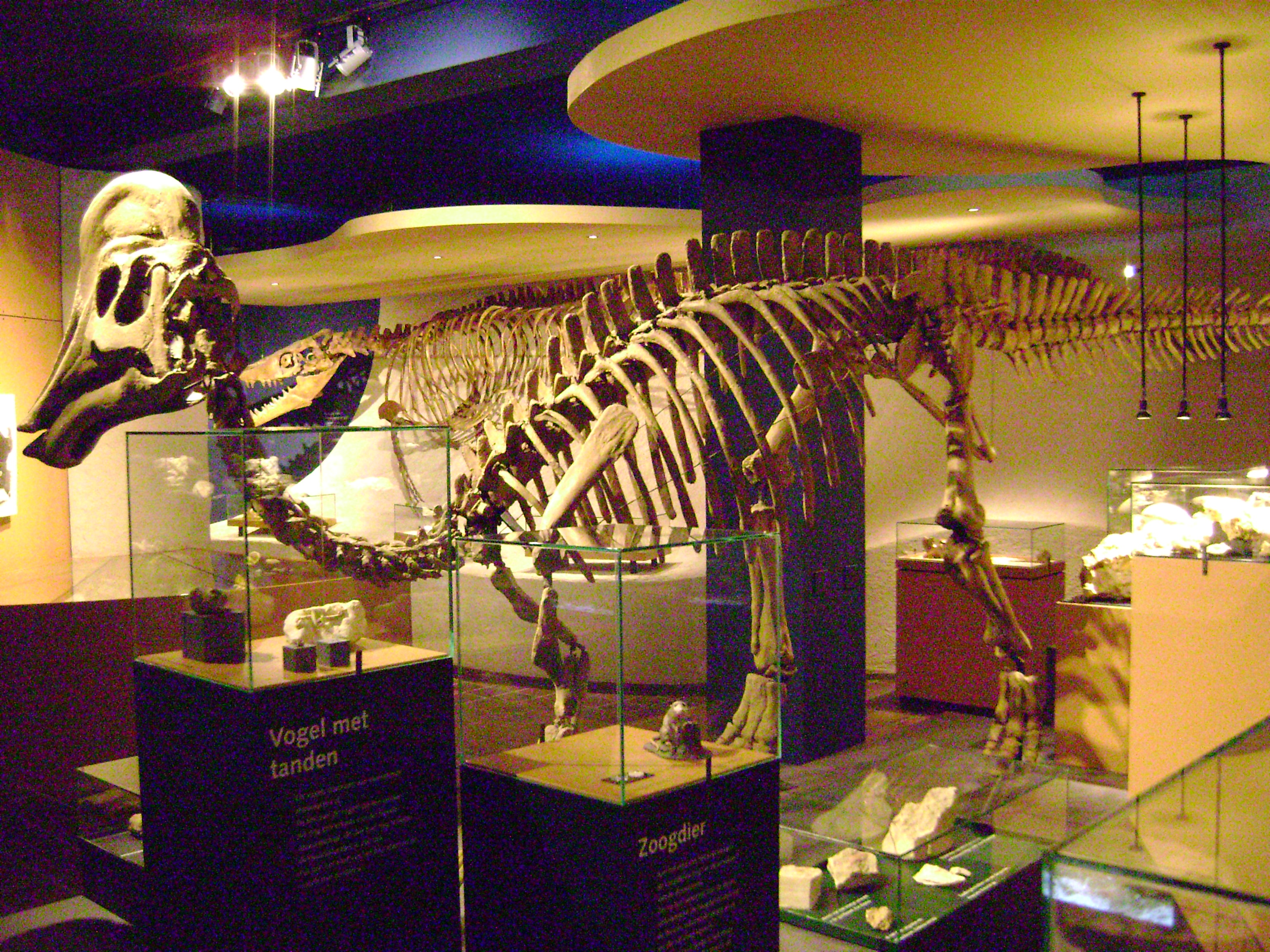
Skeletal mount of Orthomerus

==== 1942 ====
- Richard Swann Lull and Wright described the new genus Anatosaurus for Claosaurus annectens. They also name the new species Anatosaurus copei.

==== 1943 ====
- Hoffet described the new species Mandschurosaurus laosensis.

==== 1945 ====
- Riabinin described the new species Orthomerus weberi.
- Gilmore and Stewart described the new genus and species Neosaurus missouriensis.
- Gilmore erected the new genus Parrosaurus to house the species Neosaurus missouriensis, as the name Neosaurus was occupied.

==== 1946 ====
- Young described the new genus and species Sanpasaurus yaoi.
- Colbert redescribed the species Hadrosaurus minor.

=== 1950s ===
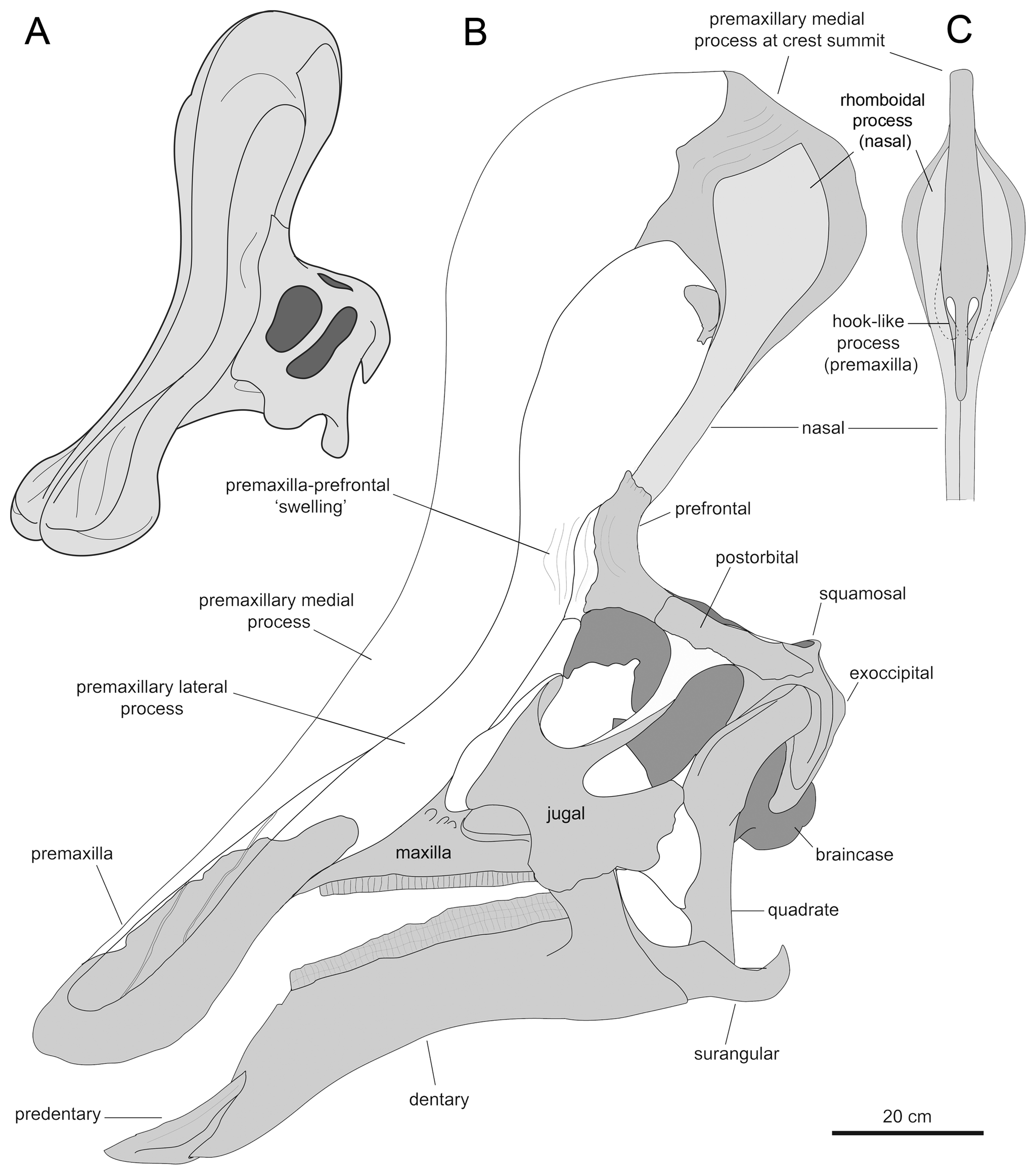
Illustration of the skull of Tsintaosaurus

==== 1952 ====
- Rozhdestvensky described the new species Saurolophus angustirostris.

==== 1953 ====
- Sternberg described the new genus and species Brachylophosaurus canadensis.

==== 1958 ====
- Young described the new species Tanius chingkankouensis.
- Young described the new genus and species Tsintaosaurus spinorhinus.

=== 1960s ===
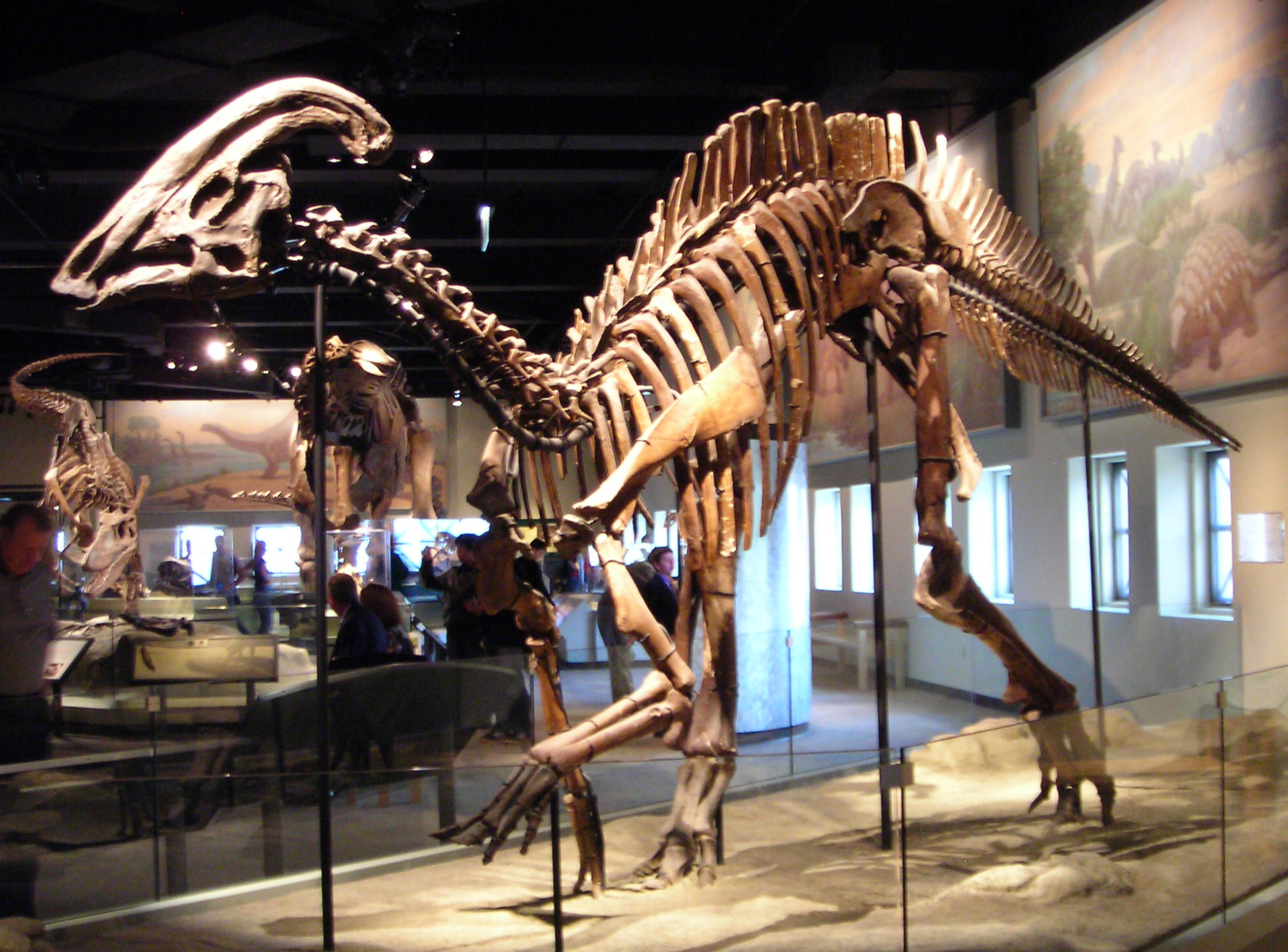
Skeletal reconstruction of Parasaurolophus cyrtocristatus

==== 1960 ====
- Langston described the new genus and species Lophorhothon atopus.

==== 1961 ====
- Ostrom described the new species Parasaurolophus cyrtocristatus.

==== 1964 ====
- Ostrom supported Krausel's 1922 claim that fossil plant material found associated with an Edmontosaurus annectens mummy was actually its gut contents.

==== 1967 ====
- Russel and Chamney studied distribution of hadrosaur in Maastrichtian North America. The concluded that Edmontosaurus regalis lived near the coasts while Hypacrosaurus altispinus and Saurolophus osborni lived slightly more inland.

==== 1968 ====
- Rozhdeventsky described the new genus and species Aralosaurus tubiferous. He also described the new species Procheneosaurus convincens.

=== 1970s ===
==== 1970 ====
- Galton argued that the anatomy of the hadrosaur pelvis was more consistent with a horizontal posture like that seen in modern flightless birds than with the "kangaroo" posture they were often reconstructed in.

==== 1971 ====
- Dodson argued that hadrosaurs may not have fed exclusively on land.

==== 1973 ====
- Hu described the new genus and species Shantungosaurus giganteus.

==== 1975 ====
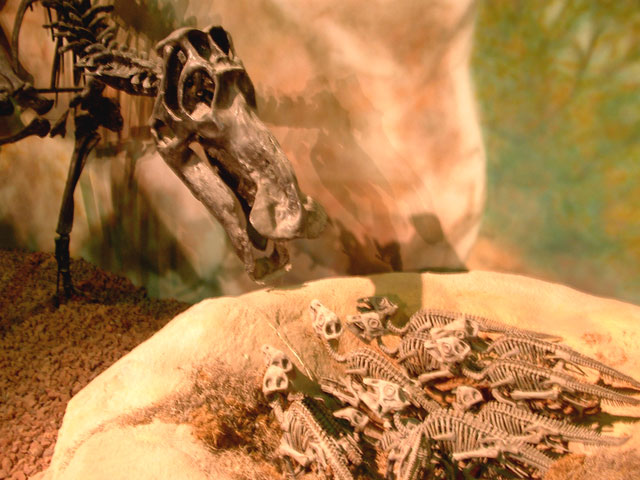
Skeletal mount of Maiasaura and hatchlings

- Dodson found evidence for sexual and ontogenetic dimorphism in two different kinds of lambeosaurine using morphometrics.

==== 1976 ====
- Zhen described the new species Tanius laiyengensis.

==== 1979 ====
- Brett-Surman erected the new genus Gilmoreosaurus to house the species Mandschurosaurus mongoliensis. He also described the new genus and species Secernosaurus koerneri.
- Brett-Surman was unable to determine where hadrosaurs first evolved.
- Horner and Makela described the new genus and species Maiasaura peeblesorum. They argued that hadrosaurs cared for their young for an extended period after hatching.
- Horner argued that hadrosaur fossils found in marine deposited were simply the preserved remains of individuals that had washed out to sea from a terrestrial place of origin.
- Dong described the new genus and species Microhadrosaurus nanshiungensis.

=== 1980s ===
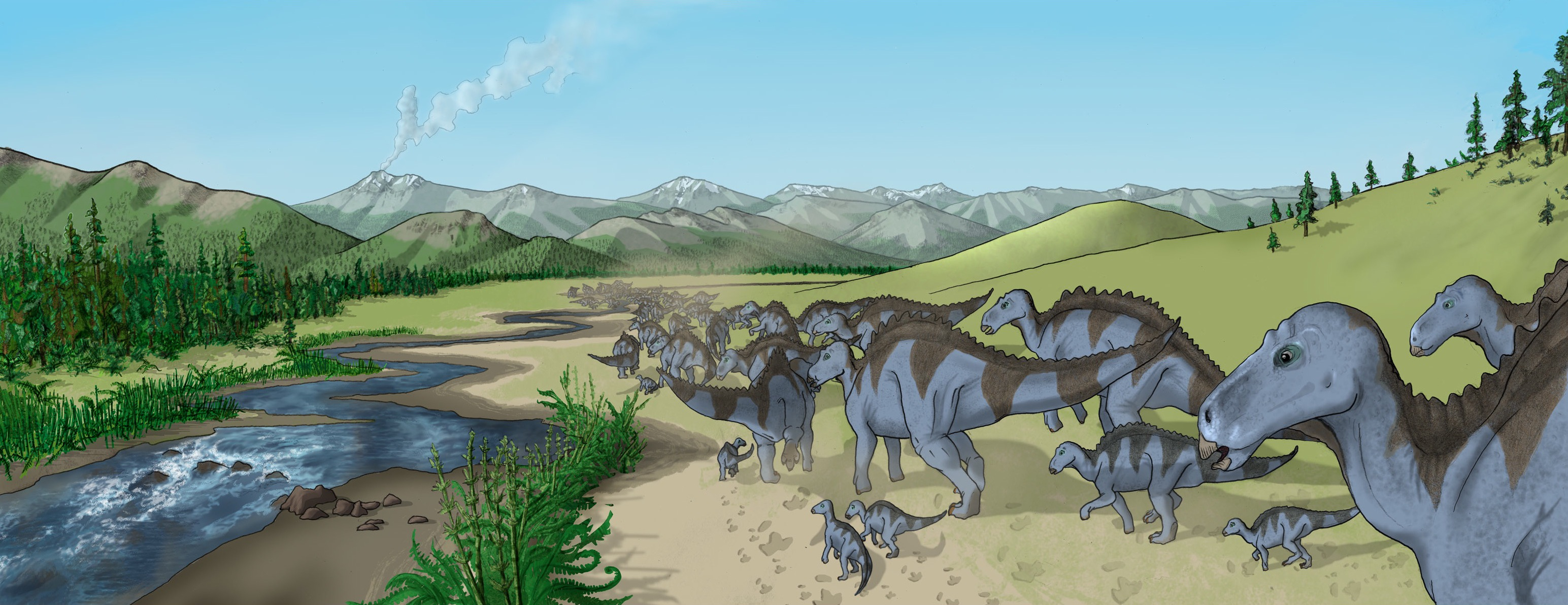
Hotton argued that some hadrosaurs may have migrated

==== 1980 ====
- Hotton argued that some hadrosaurs may have migrated seasonally in a north–south direction.

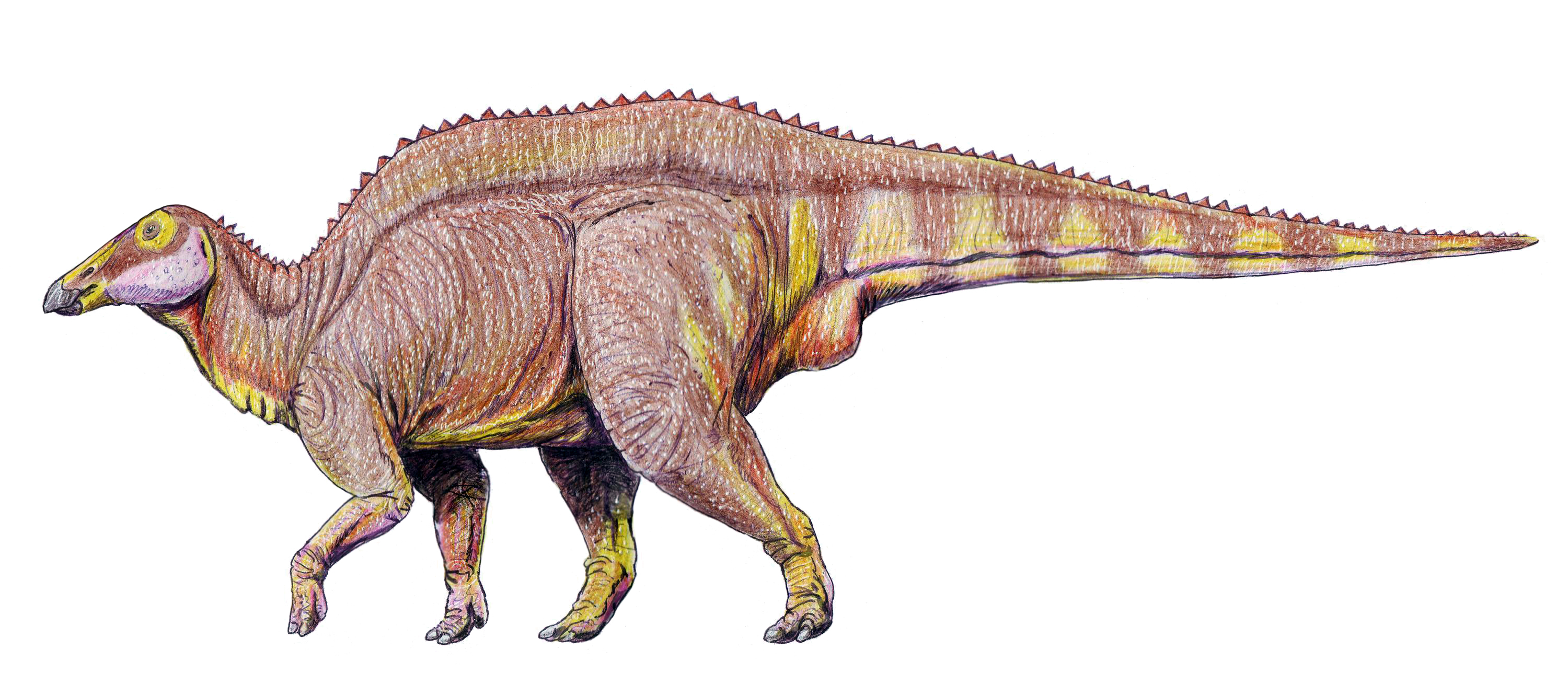
Artist's restoration of Barsboldia

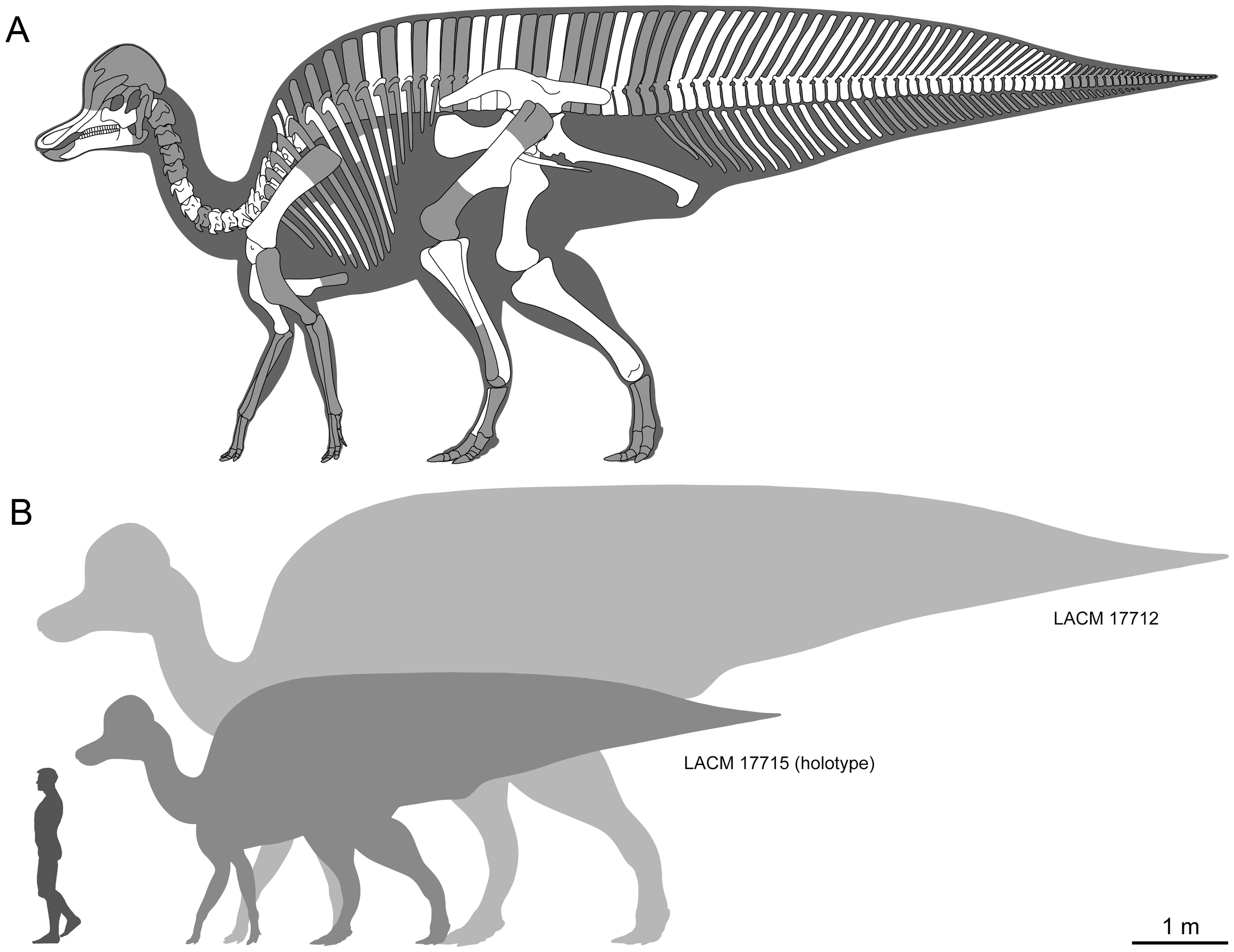
Skeletal reconstruction and size comparison Lambeosaurus (now Magnapaulia) laticaudus

==== 1981 ====
- Teresa Maryańska and Osmolska described the new genus and species Barsboldia sicinskii.
- Morris described the new species Lambeosaurus laticaudus.

==== 1982 ====
- Suslov and Shilin described the new genus and species Arstanosaurus akkurganensis.
- Carpenter disputed the idea that hadrosaurs only nested in upland environments, instead arguing that fossil hadrosaur eggs and hatchlings were only absent from coastal deposits because the chemistry of the ancient soils were simply too acidic to preserve them.
- Thulborn argued that hadrosaurs may have been able to run at speeds of up to 14–20 km/h for sustained periods.

==== 1983 ====
- Horner observed that Maiasaura peeblesorum is only known to have lived in the upper regions of contemporary coastal plains.
- Weishampel described hadrosaur chewing and cranial kinetics.
- Weishampel and Weishampel reported the presence of hadrosaur remains on the Antarctic Peninsula.

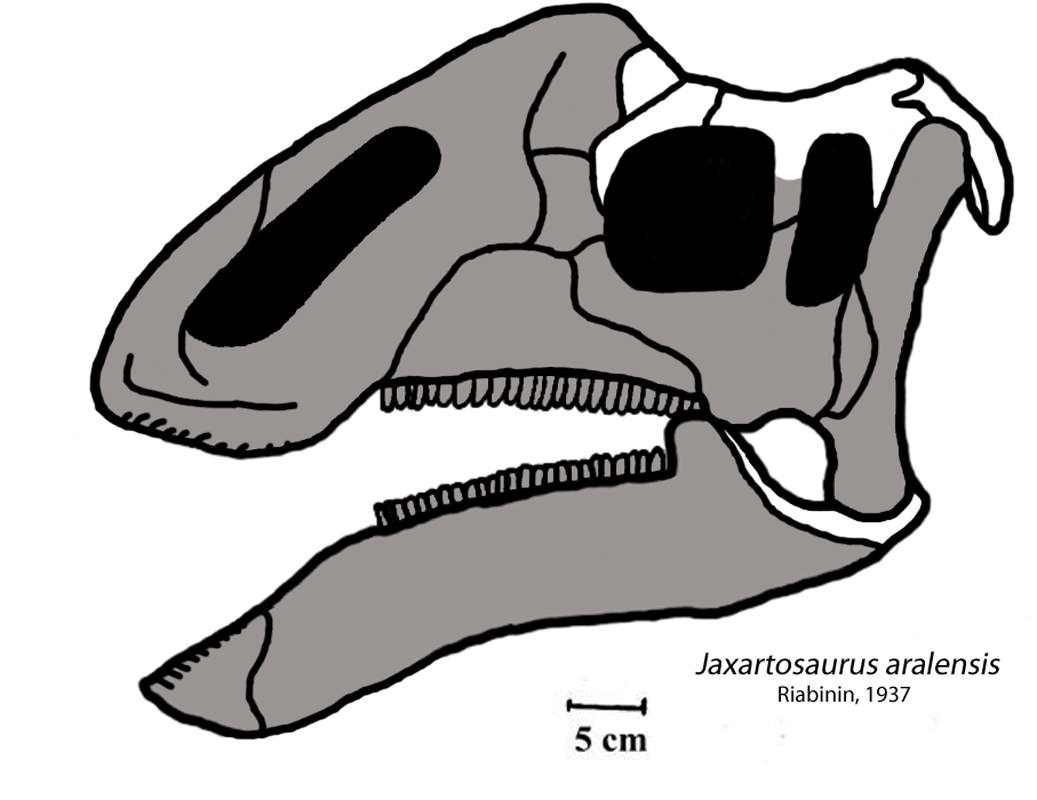
Illustration of a Jaxartosaurus skull

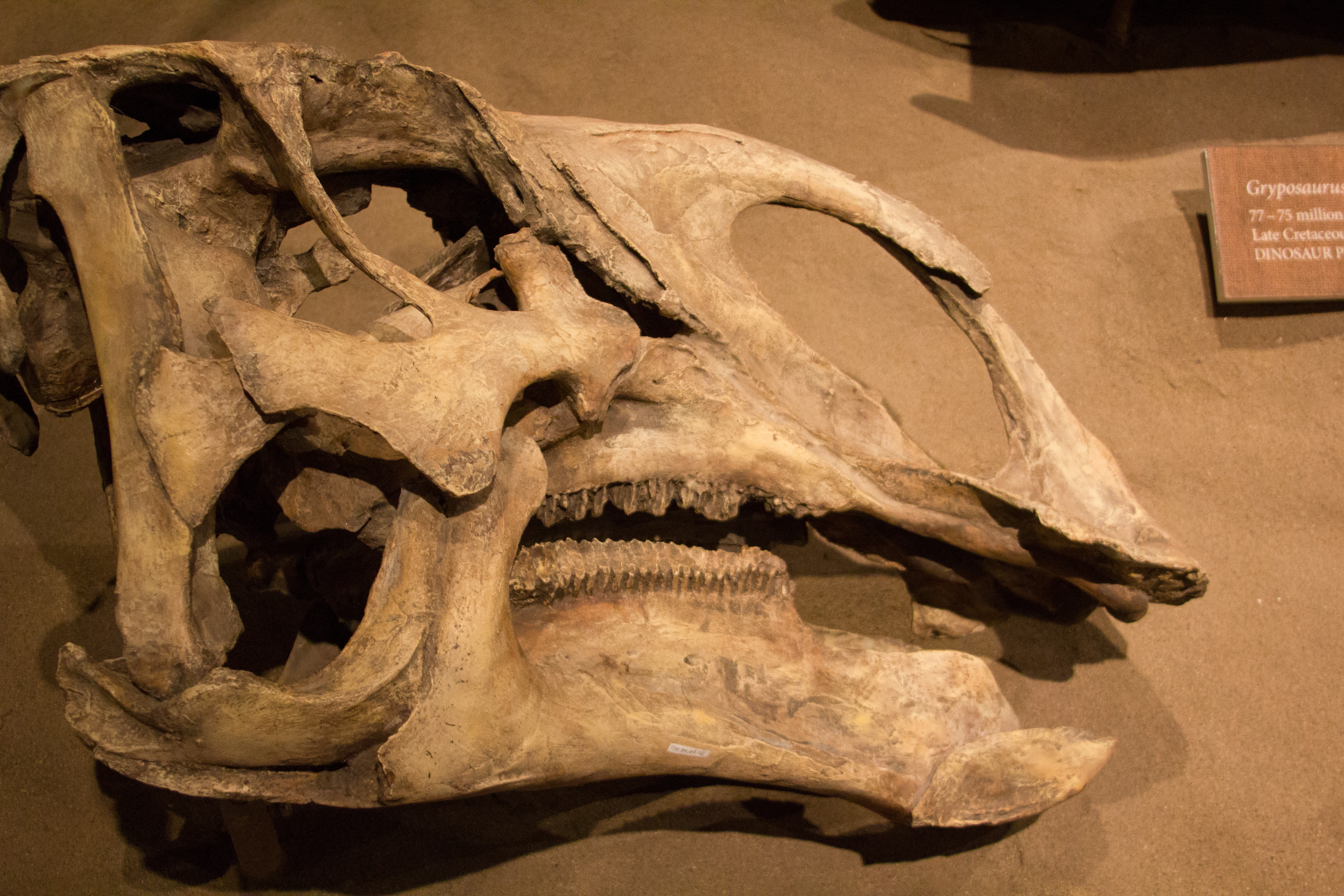
Skull of Brachylophosaurus

==== 1984 ====
- Wu described the new genus and species Jaxartosaurus fuyuensis.
- Milner and Norman argued that hadrosaurs evolved in Asia.
- Horner observed that fossil eggs and hadrosaur hatchlings were common in sediments deposited in the upper regions of what were once coastal plains.
- Weishampel described hadrosaur chewing and cranial kinetics.
- Norman described hadrosaur chewing and cranial kinetics.
- Weishampel argued that hadrosaurs fed mainly on vegetation of 2 m in height or less but had a maximum browsing height of 4 m.
- Bonaparte and others described the new species Kritosaurus australis.

==== 1985 ====
- Norman and Weishampel described hadrosaur chewing and cranial kinetics.

==== 1987 ====
- Horner observed that fossil eggs and hadrosaur hatchlings were common in sediments deposited in the upper regions of what were once coastal plains.
- Farlow argued that their highly developed chewing abilities and large gut volumes meant hadrosaurs werehighly adapted to feeding on nutrient poor, fibrous vegetation.

==== 1988 ====
- Horner described the new species Brachylophosaurus goodwini.

=== 1990s ===
==== 1990 ====
- Brett-Surman described the new genus Anatotitan for Anatosaurus copei.
- Horner argued that the hadrosaurids were not a natural group, and instead that the two major groups of hadrosaurs, the generally uncrested hadrosaurines and the crested lambeosaurs had separate origins within the Iguanodontia. Horner thought that the uncrested hadrosaurs were descended from a relative of Iguanodon, while the crested lambeosaurs were descended from a relative of Ouranosaurus. However, this proposal would find no support in any subsequent research publication.
- Weishampel and Horner found the Hadrosauridae to be a natural group after all. They also found cladistic support for the traditional division of Hadrosauridae into the subfamilies Hadrosaurinae and Lambeosaurinae.
- Weishampel reported the presence of hadrosaurs on the Antarctic peninsula.

==== 1991 ====
- Bolotsky and Kurzanov described the new genus and species Amurosaurus riabinini.

==== 1992 ====
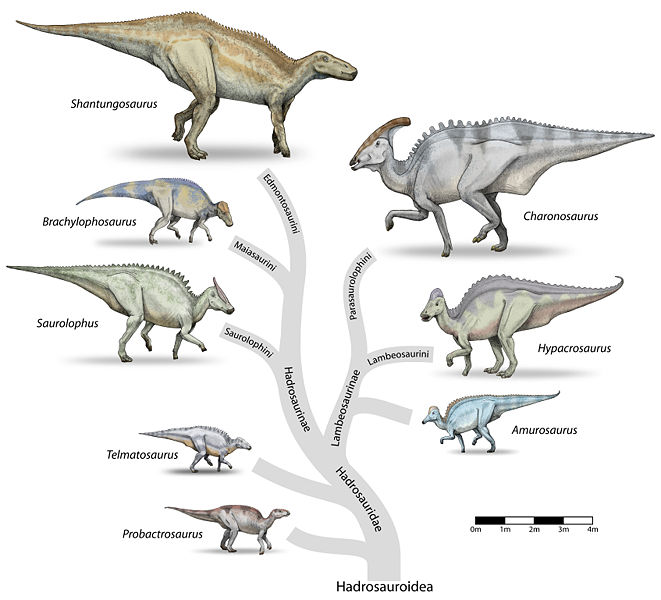
Scientists began reconstructing the hadrosaur family tree in the 1990s.

- Horner described the new species Gryposaurus latidens. He also described the new species Prosaurolophus blackfeetensis.

==== 1993 ====
- Hunt and Lucas described the new genus and species Anasazisaurus horneri. They also described the new genus and species Naashoibitosaurus ostromi.
- Weishampel, Norman, and Griogescu named the clade Euhadrosauria.
- Weishampel and others proposed a node-based definition for the Hadrosauridae: the descendants of the most recent common ancestor shared by Telmatosaurus and Parasaurolophus. They found the hadrosaurs to be a natural group, contrary to Horner's 1990 arguments that the hadrosaur subfamilies were descended from different kinds of iguanodont. They also found cladistic support for the traditional division of Hadrosauridae into the subfamilies Hadrosaurinae and Lambeosaurinae.
- Clouse and Horner reported the presence of hadrosaur egg, embryo and hatchling fossils from the Judith River Formation of Montana. Since these sediments were deposited in a low-lying coastal plain, the researchers' discovery contradicted previous hypotheses that hadrosaurs either didn't nest in lowland areas or that local ancient soil was too acidic to preserve them.

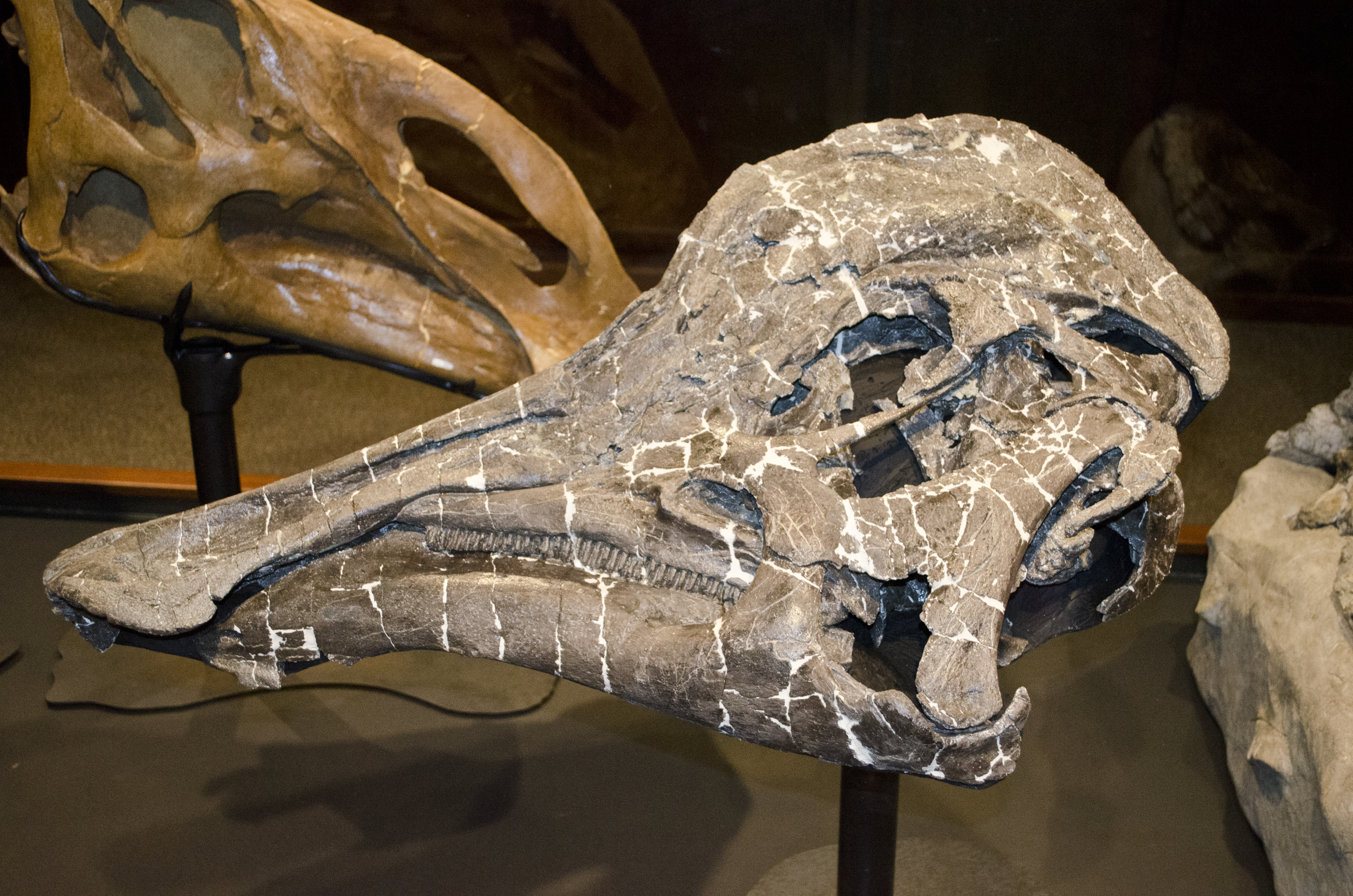
Skull of Hypacrosaurus stebingeri

==== 1994 ====
- Horner and Currie described the new species Hypacrosaurus stebingeri.

==== 1996 ====
- Chin and Gill described Maiasaura peeblesorum coprolites from an ancient nesting ground of that species. The coprolites were "blocky", irregularly-shaped masses that preserved plant fragments. The researchers identified it as feces because the masses contained fossilized dung beetle burrows. The plant material suggested a diet consisting mainly of conifer stems.

==== 1997 ====
- Forster found the hadrosaurs to be a natural group, contrary to Horner's 1990 arguments that the hadrosaur subfamilies were descended from different kinds of iguanodont. They also found cladistic support for the traditional division of Hadrosauridae into the subfamilies Hadrosaurinae and Lambeosaurinae. She preferred to define the Hadrosauridae as the most recent common ancestor of the hadrosaurines and lambeosaurines and all of its descendants. Unlike the definition used by Weishampel and others in 1993, this definition excluded Telmatosaurus.

==== 1999 ====
- Sereno found the hadrosaurs to be a natural group, contrary to Horner's 1990 arguments that the hadrosaur subfamilies were descended from different kinds of iguanodont.

== 21st century ==
=== 2000s ===
==== 2000 ====
- Godefroit, Zan, and Jin described the new genus and species Charonosaurus jiayinensis.
- Case and others reported the presence of hadrosaurs on the Antarctica peninsula. The remains studied were found on Vega Island and represent the southernmost known hadrosaur fossils. When the animals were still alive, this site was probably at a latitude of about 65 degrees South.
- Horner and others studied the histology of Maiasaura peeblesorum bones. They found that Maiasaura only took 8–10 years to reach adult body size. A 7 metres (23 ft) adult Maiasaura could have an adult body mass of over 2,000 kilograms (4,400 lb) despite hatching at a length of about half a meter and with a body mass of less than a kilogram. This disparity implies a rate or growth similar to those found in modern mammals.

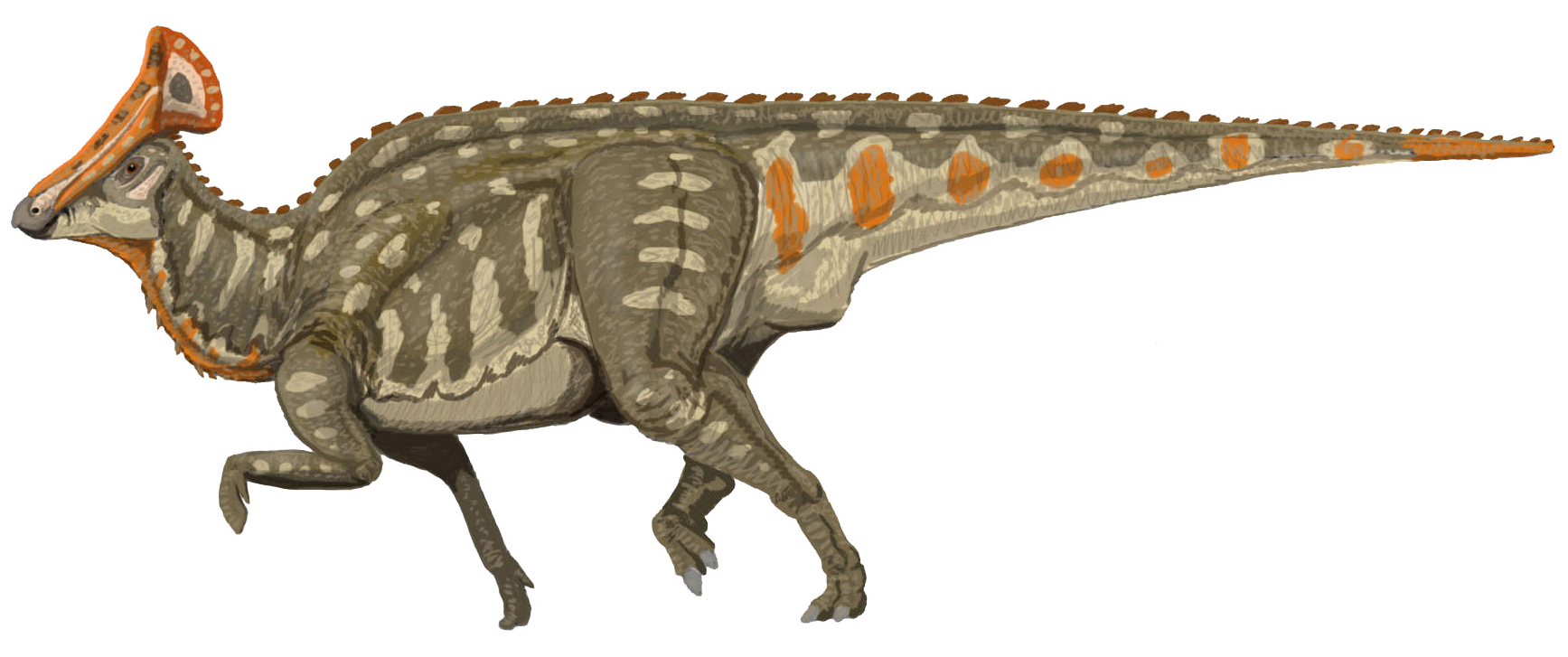
Artist's restoration of Olorotitan arharensis

==== 2001 ====
- Horner and others published additional research on the histology of Maiasaura peeblesorum bones.

==== 2003 ====
- You and others described the new genus and species Equijubus normani.
- Kobayashi and Azuma described the new genus and species Fukuisaurus tetoriensis.
- Godefroit, Bolotsky, and Alifanov described the new genus and species Olorotitan arharensis.

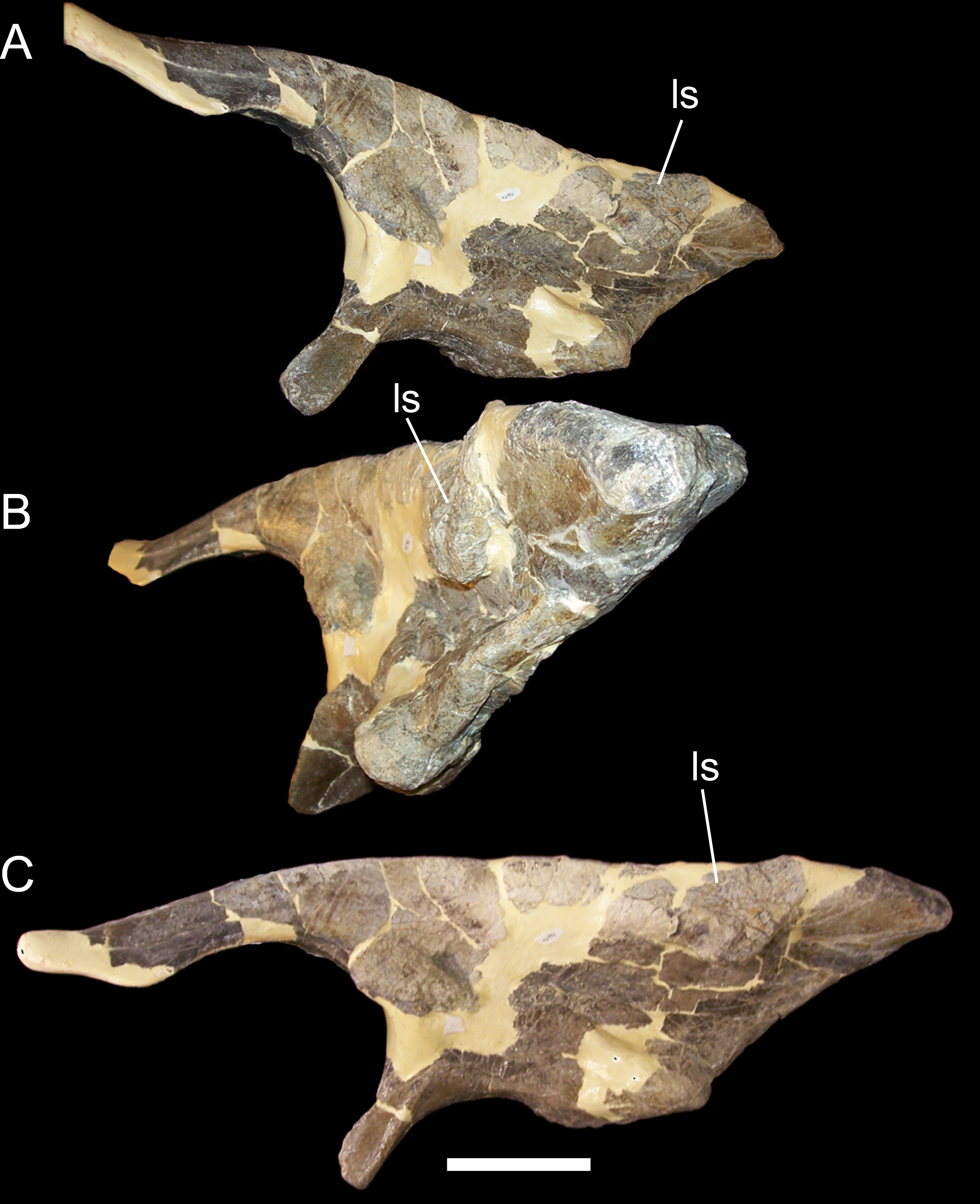
Left ilium of Cedrorestes

==== 2004 ====
- Bolotsky and Godefroit described the new genus and species Kerberosaurus manakini.

==== 2005 ====
- Godefroit, Li, and Shang described the new genus and species Penelopognathus weishampeli.

==== 2006 ====
- Prieto-Márquez and others described the new genus and species Koutalisaurus kohlerorum.

==== 2007 ====
- Gilpin and others described the new genus and species Cedrorestes crichtoni.

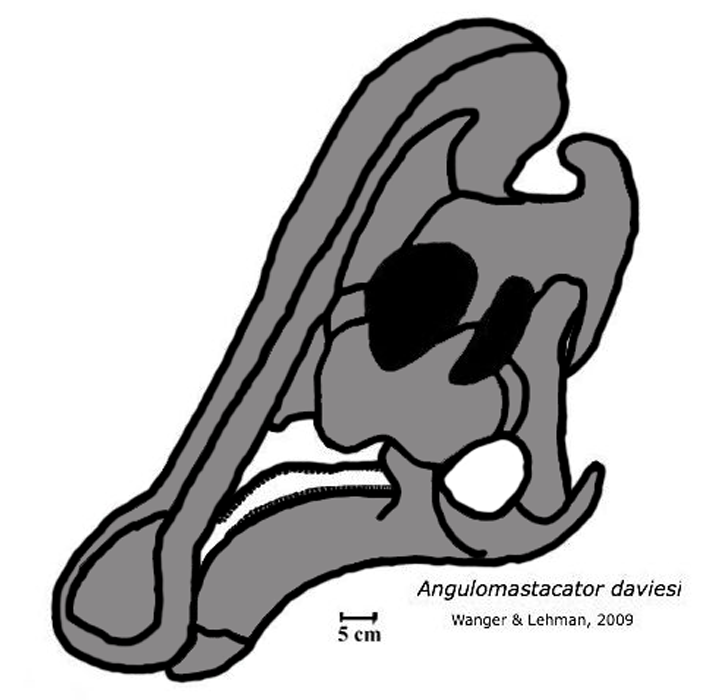
Artist's reconstruction of an Angulomastacator skull

- Mo and others described the new genus and species Nanningosaurus dashiensis.
- Zhao and others described the new genus and species Zhuchengosaurus maximus.

==== 2008 ====
- Godefroit and others described the new genus and species Sahaliyania elunchunorum and the new genus and species Wulagasaurus dongi.

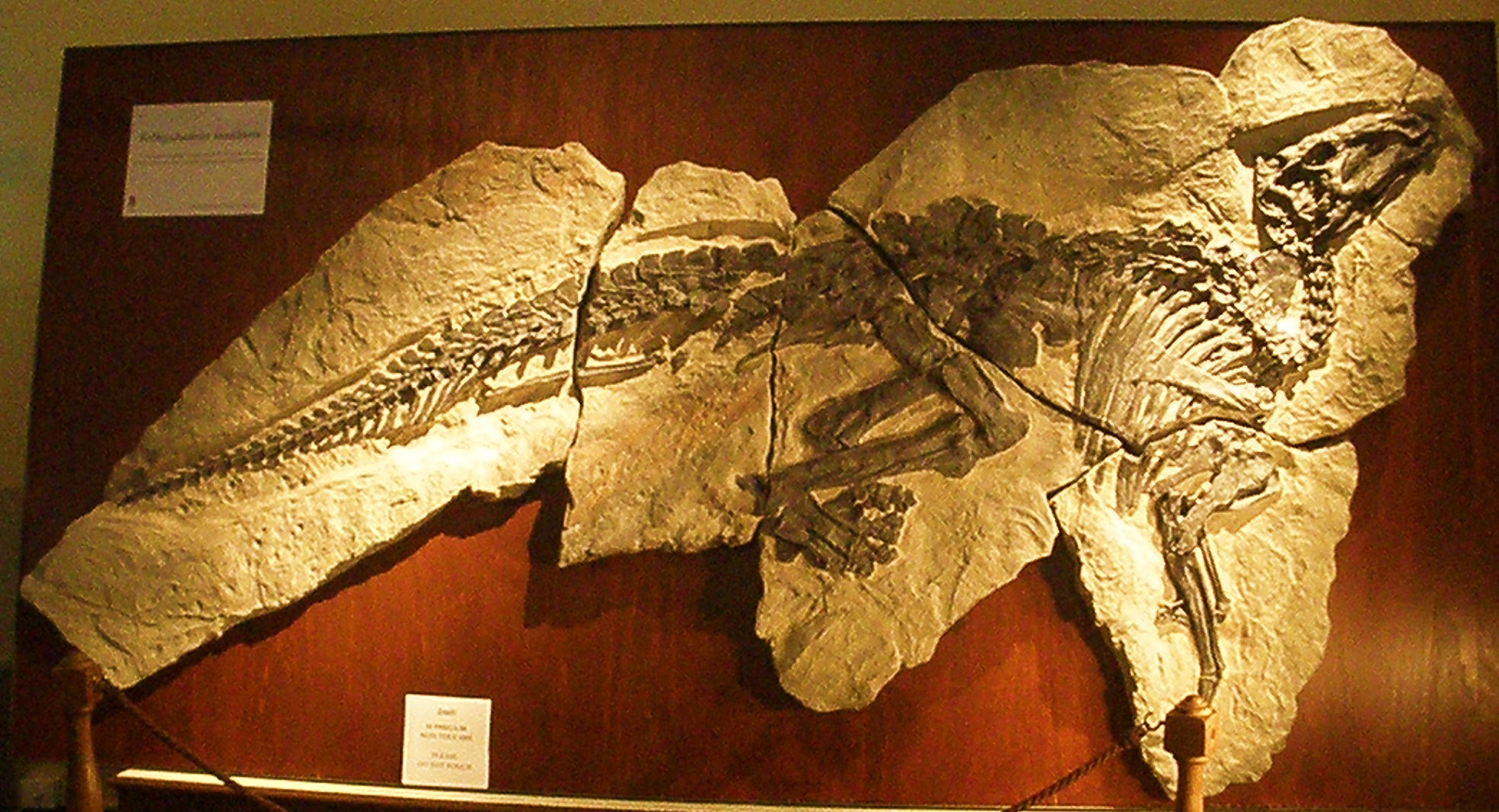
Skeleton of Tethyshadros insularis

==== 2009 ====
- Wagner and Lehman described the new genus and species Angulomastacator daviesi.
- Pereda-Suberbiola and others described the new genus and species Arenysaurus ardevoli.
- Sues and Averianov described the new genus and species Levnesovia transoxiana.
- Dalla Vecchia described the new genus and species Tethyshadros insularis.

=== 2010s ===
==== 2010 ====
- Cruzado-Caballero and others described the new genus and species Blasisaurus canudoi.
- Prieto-Márquez described the new genus and species Glishades ericksoni.
- Juárez Valieri and others described the new genus and species Willinakaqe salitralensis.

==== 2011 ====
- Gates and others described the new genus and species Acristavus gagslarsoni.

==== 2012 ====
- Godefroit and others described the new genus and species Batyrosaurus rozhdestvenskyi.
- Ramírez-Velasco and others described the new genus and species Huehuecanauhtlus tiquichensis.
- Godefroit and others described the new genus and species Kundurosaurus nagornyi.
- Coria, Riga and Casadío described the new genus and species Lapampasaurus cholinoi.
- Prieto-Márquez and Brañas described the new genus and species Latirhinus uitstlani.
- Prieto-Márquez Chiappe, and Joshi described the new genus and species Magnapaulia.

==== 2013 ====
- Prieto-Márquez and others described the new genus and species Canardia garonnensis.
- Phil R. Bell and Kirstin S. Brink described the new genus and species Kazaklambia convincens.
- Prieto-Márquez and Wagner described the new species Saurolophus morrisi.
- Wang and others described the new genus and species Yunganglong datongensis.

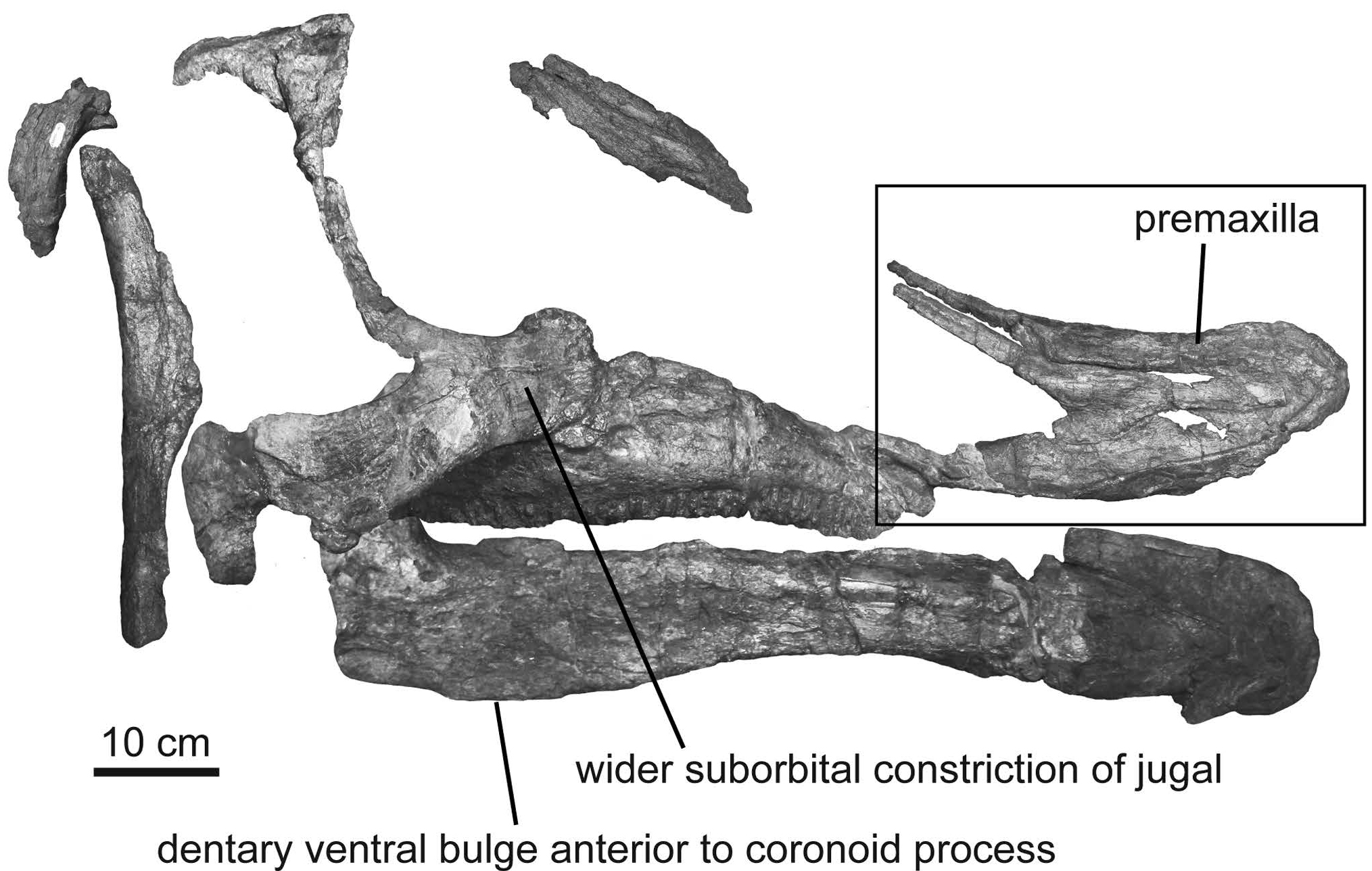
Skull of Augustynolophus

==== 2014 ====
- Prieto-Márquez and others described the new genus Augustynolophus.
- Gates and Scheetz described the new genus and species Rhinorex condrupus.
- Xing and others described the new genus and species Zhanghenglong yangchengensis.
- Gates and others described the new genus Adelolophus.
- You, Li, and Dodson described the new genus Gongpoquansaurus.

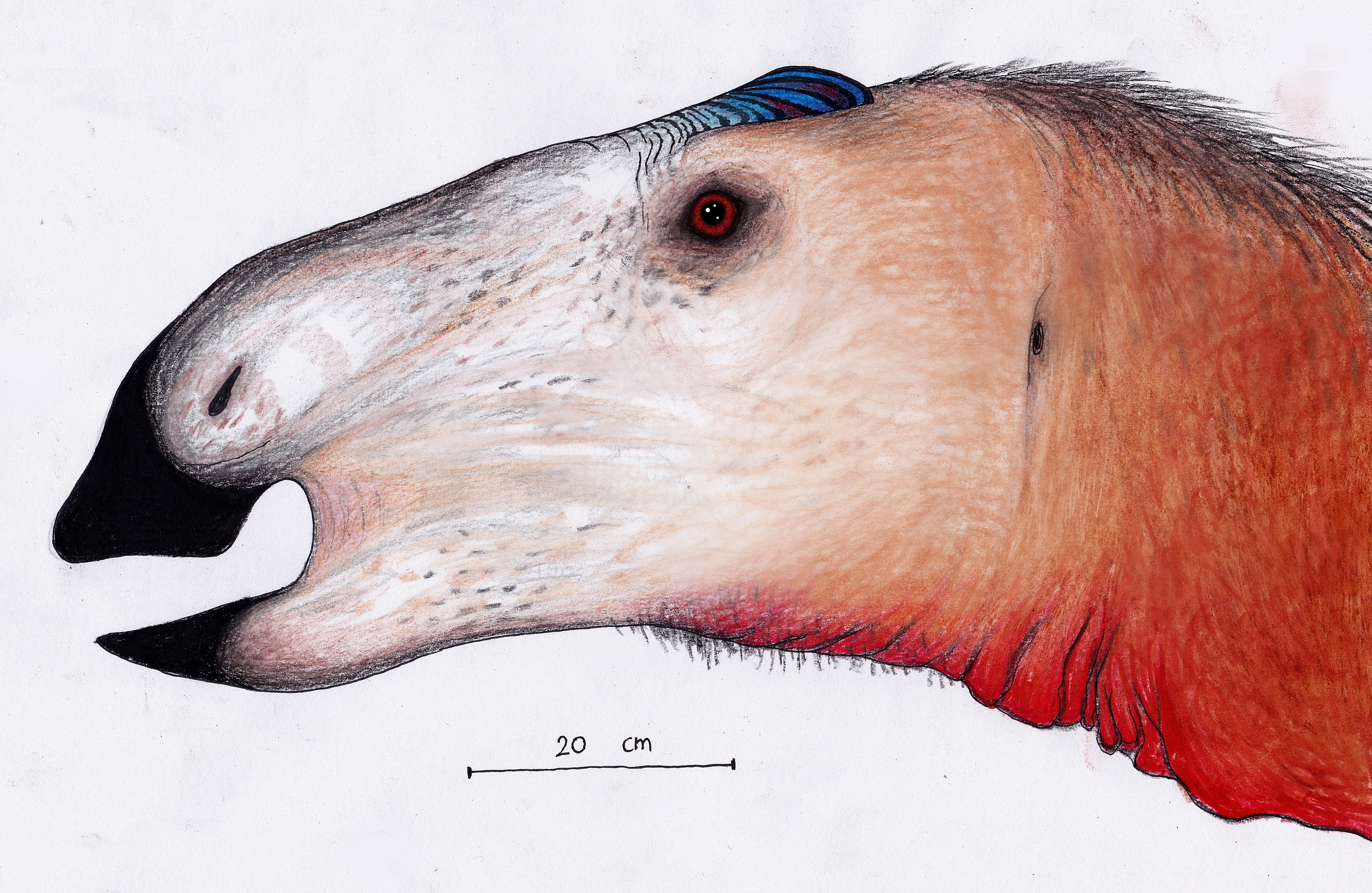
Artist's restoration of Probrachylophosaurus

==== 2015 ====
- Shibata and Azuma described the new genus and species Koshisaurus katsuyama.
- Mori, Druckenmiller and Erickson described the new genus and species Ugrunaaluk kuukpikensis.
- Freedman Fowler, and Horner described the new genus and species Probrachylophosaurus.
- Shibata and others described the new genus and species Sirindhorna khoratensis.

==== 2016 ====
- Xu and others described the new genus and species Datonglong.
- Wang and others described the new genus and species Zuoyunlong.
- Prieto-Marquez, Erickson and Ebersole described the new genus and species Eotrachodon orientalis

==== 2017 ====
- Cruzado-Caballero and Powell described the new genus and species Bonapartesaurus rionegrensis.
- Study of corpolites by Chin, Feldmann & Tashman show hadrosaurs occasionally consumed decaying wood and crustaceans

==== 2018 ====
- Gates and others described the new genus and species Choyrodon barsboldi.

==== 2019 ====
- Prieto-Márquez and others described the new genus and species Adynomosaurus arcanus.
- Zhang and others described the new genus and species Laiyangosaurus youngi.
- Tsogtbaatar and others described the new genus and species Gobihadros mongoliensis.
- Prieto-Márquez, Wagner, and Lehman described the new genus and species Aquilarhinus palimentus.
- Kobayashi and others described the new genus and species Kamuysaurus japonicus.
- A study on the nature of the fluvial systems of Laramidia during the Late Cretaceous, as indicated by data from vertebrate and invertebrate fossils from the Kaiparowits Formation of southern Utah, and on the behavior of hadrosaurid dinosaurs over these landscapes, will be published by Crystal et al. (2019).
- A study on the osteology and phylogenetic relationships of "Tanius laiyangensis" is published by Zhang et al. (2019).
- A study on the bone histology of tibiae of Maiasaura peeblesorum, focusing on the composition, frequency and cortical extent of localized vascular changes, is published by Woodward (2019).
- Three juvenile specimens of Prosaurolophus maximus, providing new information on the ontogeny of this taxon, are described from the Bearpaw Formation (Alberta, Canada) by Drysdale et al. (2019).
- A study on the impact of bone tissue structure, early diagenetic regimes and other taphonomic variables on the preservation potential of soft tissues in vertebrate fossils, as indicated by data from fossils of Edmontosaurus annectens from the Standing Rock Hadrosaur Site (Maastrichtian Hell Creek Formation, South Dakota), is published by Ullmann, Pandya & Nellermoe (2019), who report the first recovery of osteocytes and vessels from a fossil vertebral centrum and ossified tendons.
- The first definitive lambeosaurine fossil (an isolated skull bone) is described from the Liscomb Bonebed of the Prince Creek Formation (Alaska, United States) by Takasaki et al. (2019).
- Traces preserved on a tail vertebra of a hadrosaurid dinosaur from the Upper Cretaceous Hell Creek Formation (Montana, United States) are described by Peterson & Daus (2019), who interpret their finding as feeding traces produced by a late-stage juvenile Tyrannosaurus rex.

=== 2020s ===
==== 2020 ====
- Longrich and others describe the new genus and species Ajnabia.
- A study on the bone microstructure of Mongolian hadrosauroid dinosaurs, evaluating its implications for the knowledge of growth strategies and evolution of gigantism in hadrosauroids, is published by Słowiak et al. (2020).
- A study on the anatomy of the tail of Tethyshadros insularis is published by Dalla Vecchia (2020).
- Brownstein (2020) describes new fossil material of hadrosauromorphs from the Maastrichtian New Egypt Formation (New Jersey, United States), including a skeleton of a specimen which was probably a small-bodied adult hadrosauromorph from a lineage outside Hadrosauridae and fossils of juvenile hadrosauromorphs.
- A study on pathologies affecting two hadrosaurid vertebrae from the Dinosaur Provincial Park (Alberta, Canada) is published by Rothschild et al. (2020), who consider Langerhans cell histiocytosis to be the most likely diagnosis, making it the first case of LCH recognized in a dinosaur so far.
- A study on a set of fused hadrosaur vertebrae with fragments of a tooth of Tyrannosaurus rex scattered through the intervertebral space is published by Rothschild et al. (2020), who interpret this findings as evidence indicating that the space between the vertebrae was not occupied by intervertebral discs, but rather by an articular space similar to that in modern reptiles.
- A study on the migratory behaviours of hadrosaurs, as indicated by strontium isotope data from hadrosaur teeth from the Late Cretaceous of Alberta (Canada), is published by Terrill, Henderson & Anderson (2020).
- A study aiming to determine whether body size and ontogenetic age were strongly correlated in hadrosaurid dinosaurs from the Dinosaur Park Formation (Alberta, Canada), and to test the hypothesis of a rapid growth rate of hadrosaurids from the Dinosaur Park Formation relative to those from the Two Medicine Formation, is published by Wosik et al. (2020).
- Partial forelimb of a large hadrosaurid with similarities to forelimbs of lambeosaurines is described from the Maastrichtian New Egypt Formation (New Jersey, United States) by Brownstein & Bissell (2020), who interpret this findings as evidence of the presence of a morphotype of large hadrosauromorph with elongate forelimbs in the latest Maastrichtian of eastern North America.
- A study on the anatomy of fossils of Ugrunaaluk kuukpikensis and on the taxonomic status of this species is published by Takasaki et al. (2020), who consider Ugrunaaluk to be a junior synonym of the genus Edmontosaurus.
- Evidence of pre-mortem traumatic injuries in multiple skeletal elements (especially in tail vertebrae) of Edmontosaurus annectens from the Lance Formation (Wyoming, United States) is presented by Siviero et al. (2020).
- A study on the taphonomy and depositional history of an extensive Maastrichtian bonebed in the Lance Formation of eastern Wyoming dominated by fossils of Edmontosaurus annectens is published by Snyder et al. (2020).
- A study on the interior structure of the nasal spine of Tsintaosaurus spinorhinus is published by Zhang et al. (2020).
- Description of new fossil material of Pararhabdodon isonensis, and a study on the bone histology and life history of this taxon, is published by Serrano et al. (2020).
- A study on the morphology and likely causes of the injuries in the holotype specimen of Parasaurolophus walkeri is published by Bertozzo et al. (2020).
- Evidence of preservation of proteins, chromosomes and chemical markers of DNA in the cartilage of a nestling of Hypacrosaurus stebingeri from the Campanian Two Medicine Formation (Montana, United States) is presented by Bailleul et al. (2020).

==== 2021 ====
- McDonald and others described the new genus and species Ornatops incantatus.
- Santos-Cubedo and others described the new genus and species Portellsaurus sosbaynati.
- Ramírez-Velasco and others described the new genus and species Tlatolophus galorum.
- Kobayashi and others described the new genus and species Yamatosaurus izanagii
- Description of the fossil material of a tyrannosauroid theropod and an early member of the family Hadrosauridae from the Upper Cretaceous Merchantville Formation (Delaware and New Jersey, United States), possibly representing new taxa, and a study on the phylogenetic affinities of these dinosaurs is published by Brownstein (2021).
- A study on changes of diversity of dinosaurs belonging to the families Ankylosauridae, Ceratopsidae, Hadrosauridae, Dromaeosauridae, Troodontidae and Tyrannosauridae during the Late Cretaceous is published by Condamine et al. (2021), who interpret their findings as indicative of a decline of non-avian dinosaur diversity during the last 10 million years of the Cretaceous period, and attempt to determine possible causes of this decline.
- Brown, Tanke & Hone (2021) describe a hadrosaurid bone from the Campanian Dinosaur Park Formation (Alberta, Canada) preserved with bite marks produced by a small- to medium-sized theropod dinosaur, deviating from the majority of known theropod tooth marks and indicative of a behavior similar to mammalian gnawing.
- New fossil material of ornithischians, including remains of basal euiguanodontian and hadrosaurid ornithopods and the southernmost record of ankylosaurs from South America reported to date, is described from the Upper Cretaceous (Campanian–Maastrichtian) Chorrillo Formation (Argentina) by Rozadilla et al. (2021), who evaluate the implications of these fossils for the knowledge of the evolutionary history of ankylosaurs and hadrosaurids in South America.
- Description of new fossil material of Tethyshadros insularis from the Villaggio del Pescatore fossil site (Italy), a study on the age of this site and on the phylogenetic affinities of T. insularis, and a reevaluation of claims about the evolution of insular dwarfism in Late Cretaceous hadrosauroids, is published by Chiarenza et al. (2021).
- Description of new fossil material of hadrosaurids from the Upper Cretaceous Lago Colhué Huapí Formation (Argentina), and a study on the environment inhabited by these hadrosaurids and on the influence of paleoenvironmental conditions on South American hadrosaurid distribution, is published by Ibiricu et al. (2021).
- Holland et al. (2021) describe an assemblage of late juvenile hadrosaurid specimens from the Spring Creek Bonebed (Alberta, Canada), representing the first record of lambeosaurines from the Wapiti Formation and possibly indicating that age segregation was a life history strategy among hadrosaurids.
- Revision of the type material and a study on the phylogenetic affinities of Latirhinus uitstlani is published by Ramírez-Velasco, Espinosa-Arrubarrena & Alvarado-Ortega (2021); a study on the taphonomy of the skeletal elements in the holotype of L. uitstlani designated by the aforementioned authors, on the skeletal composition of the holotype, on the diagnostic utility of the characters used by Ramírez-Velasco, Espinosa-Arrubarrena & Alvarado-Ortega (2021) for referring other specimens to different hadrosaurid clades, and on the phylogenetic affinities of L. uitstlani is subsequently published by Serrano-Brañas & Prieto-Márquez (2021).
- A study on the biodiversity patterns of Late Cretaceous hadrosaurids and ceratopsids from the western interior of North America, evaluating whether the fossil record provides evidence of faunal provinciality of these dinosaurs, is published by Maidment et al. (2021).

==== 2024 ====
- Dai and others described the new genus and species Qianjiangsaurus changshengi.

== See also ==
- History of paleontology
  - Timeline of paleontology
