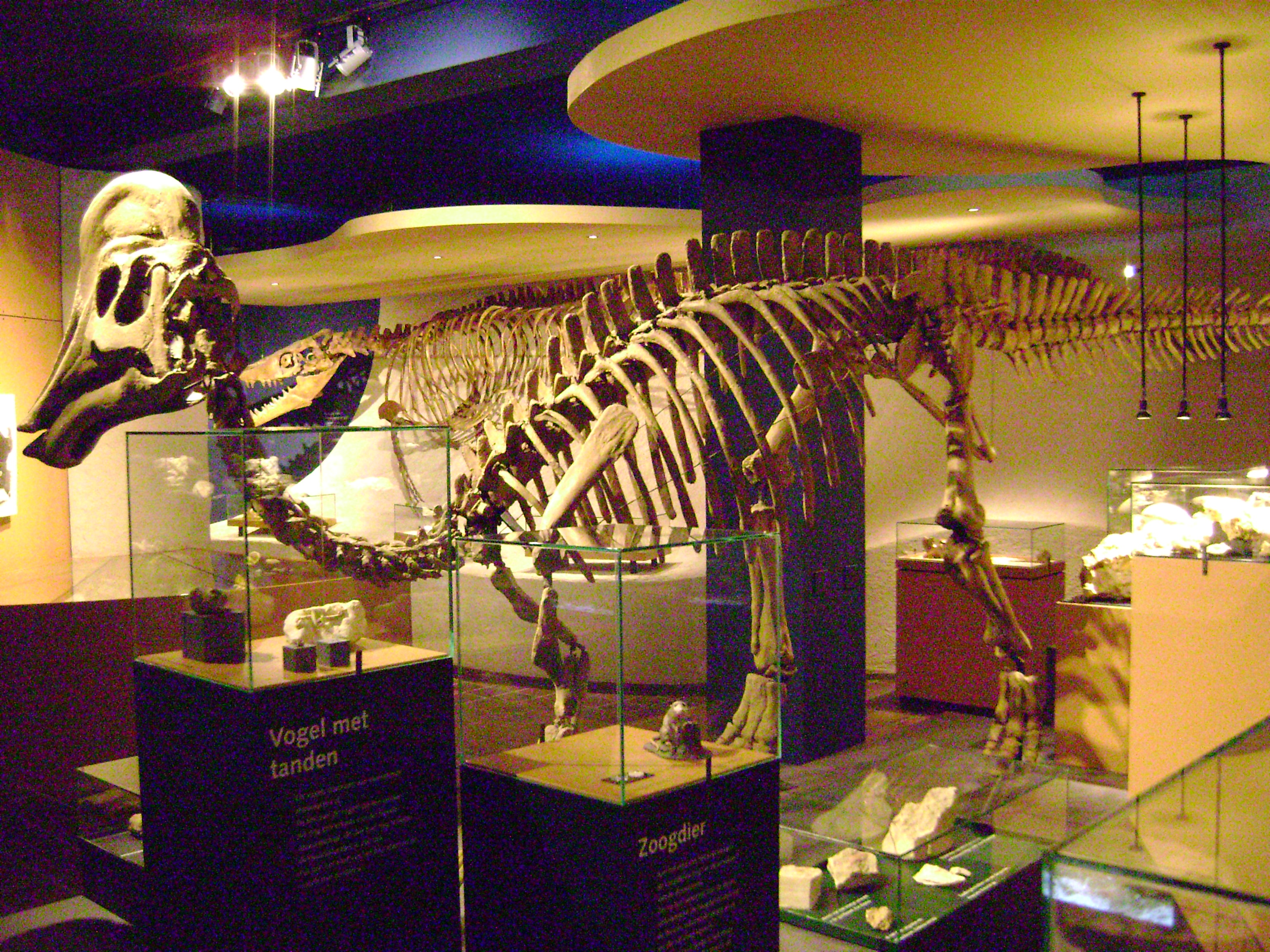
- Skeletal model

Scientific classification
- Kingdom: Animalia
- Phylum: Chordata
- Class: Reptilia
- Clade: Dinosauria
- Clade: †Ornithischia
- Clade: †Ornithopoda
- Family: †Hadrosauridae
- Genus: †Orthomerus; Seeley, 1883

Type species
- †Orthomerus dolloi Seeley, 1883

= Orthomerus =

Orthomerus Temporal range: Late Cretaceous, Maastrichtian

Extinct genus of hadrosaurid dinosaur

Orthomerus (meaning "straight femur") is a genus of dubious hadrosaurid dinosaur from the Late Cretaceous of the Netherlands. It is today an obscure genus, but in the past was conflated with the much better known Telmatosaurus.

== Discovery and history ==
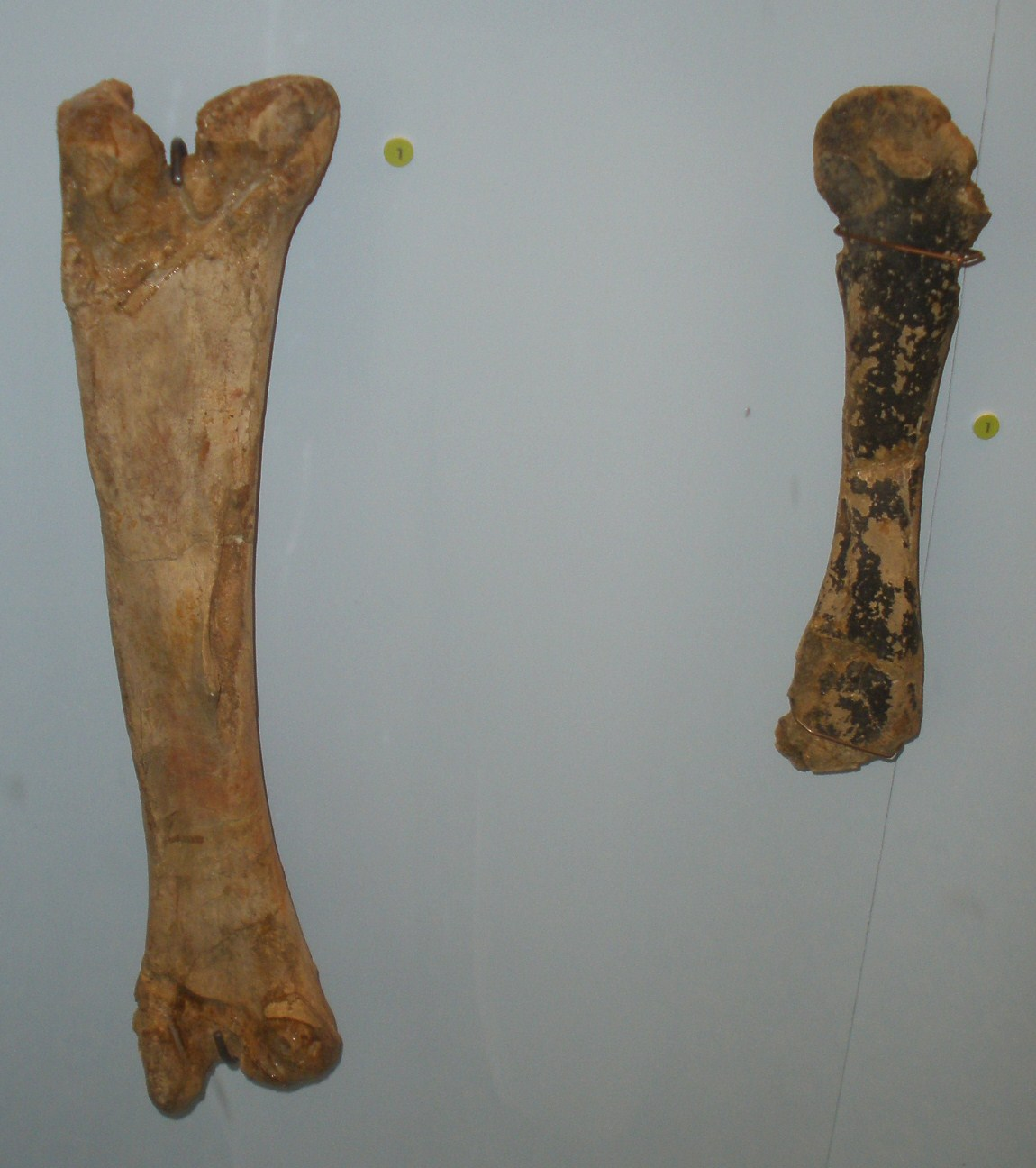
Orthomerus dolloi fossils

The type species Orthomerus dolloi was in 1883 named by the well-known British paleontologist Harry Govier Seeley. The genus name is derived from the Greek ὀρθός (orthos), "straight", and μηρός (meros), "thigh". The specific name honours the French/Belgian paleontologist Louis Dollo, who had identified the bones in August 1882, during a visit to London.

The type specimen, formed by the syntypes BMNH 42954-57, was probably found in the chalkstone quarries of the Sint-Pietersberg near the city of Maastricht, The Netherlands. It mainly consists of partial juvenile skeletal elements. These remains are from the Maastricht Formation of the late Maastrichtian stage of the Late Cretaceous, about 66 million years old. The type bones include the straight left and right femora that moved Seeley to give it its name. A left tibia and a metatarsal also discovered in the collection of Jacob Gijsbertus Samuël van Breda acquired by the British Museum of Natural History in 1871, were referred by him to the species. The leg bones are only about half the size of those belonging to the then largely unknown North American and Asian duckbills, with the femur 50 cm (20 in) long. Other more fragmentary hadrosaurid remains have been found, some of them in The Netherlands, where the species is sometimes presented as a rare "Dutch dinosaur", others perhaps in Belgium where in 1882 Dollo acquired two hadrosaurid tail vertebrae near Zichen, a Belgian border village in Belgian Limburg. It is hard to establish whether such finds belonged to the same species and not all of them have been explicitly referred to Orthomerus dolloi. Later Belgian finds included a left third metatarsal, NHMM 1996001 discovered by J.H. Kuypers near Eben Emael, where a larger right third metatarsal was also collected, NHMM RD 241, and a right maxillary tooth, NHMM 1999012, found by E. Croimans. Some phalanges and a left ulna have been reported from private collections, lacking an inventory number.

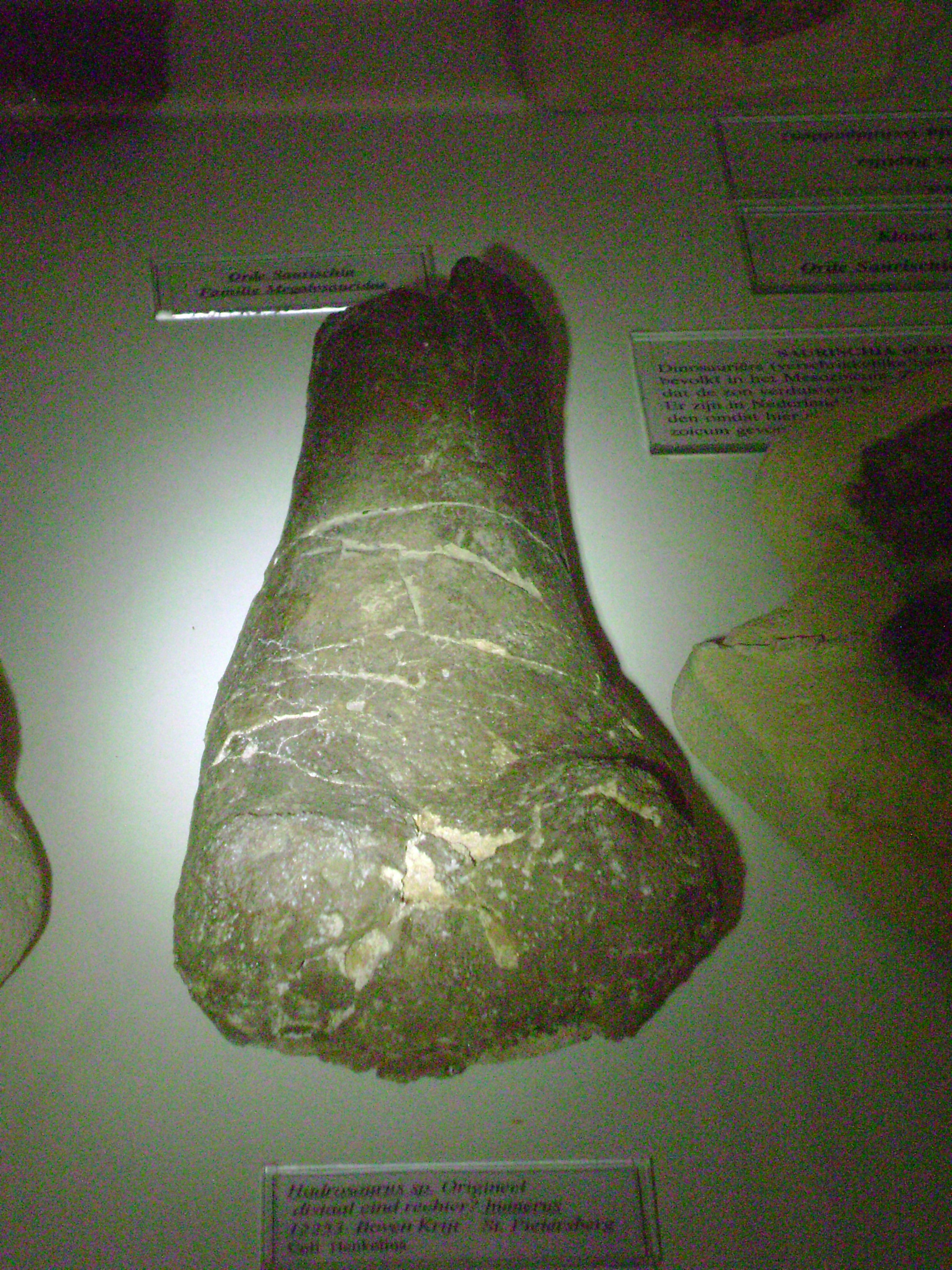
Specimen TM 11253 at the Teylers Museum

The Dutch finds include two tail vertebrae collected in the nineteenth century. A second individual dating from just below the Cretaceous–Paleogene boundary was in September 1967 discovered in a quarry near Geulhem by L. de Heer; it consists of a fragmentary left femur (MND K 21.04.003), left tibia (MND K 21.04.004) and left fibula (MND K21.04.005). Later found limb bone fragments are OGP 0196 and OGP 2111. NHMM 2002067, a partial tibia, seems not to be cospecific with the other finds, suggesting two hadrosaurid species were present in the formation. In a quarry near Bemelen a partial right dentary was found, specimen NHMM 198027, that however lacked any teeth. However, isolated teeth have been found: NHMM 1997274 by J. Vollers near Sibbe and left dentary tooth NHMM RD 214 from Berg en Terblijt, were also dentary tooth NHMM RN 28 was discovered. Finally the collection of the Teylers Museum at Haarlem features a partial right humerus, TM 11253.

A second species, Orthomerus weberi, was first described by Anatoly Nikolaevich Riabinin in 1945 for hindlimb elements from an unnamed Maastrichtian-age formation in the Crimea of what is now Ukraine (then a part of the Soviet Union). These were found by Gertruda Weber who is honoured in the specific name. As Weber was female Lev Nessov in 1995 emended the name to Orthomerus weberae. In 2015 it was made the type species of the new genus Riabininohadros, which was not formally named until 2020.

What is sometimes listed as a third species, O. transsylvanicus, is actually the type species of Telmatosaurus, which Franz Nopcsa in 1915 referred to Orthomerus, an assignment still accepted by Alfred Sherwood Romer in his review of reptiles. In recent publications Telmatosaurus is seen as a separate genus, though. If Orthomerus would be identical to Telmatosaurus the latter would be its junior synonym. Forgetting this, in 1984 Dutch geologist Eric Mulder renamed O. dolloi into Telmatosaurus dolloi. A fourth species name is Orthomerus hillii, a renaming in 1915 by Nopcsa of Iguanodon hillii Newton 1892, based on a tooth fragment. It is today seen as a nomen dubium.

In 2019, a study designated the right thighbone as the lectotype. The left thighbone would be of a smaller individual.

== Description ==
The right thighbone has a length of about fifty centimetres. In 2019, no autapomorphies nor a unique combination of traits could be established. That would make Orthomerus a nomen dubium.

== Phylogeny ==
Usually, Orthomerus was considered a member of the Hadrosauridae. However, the 2019 study included a cladistic analysis indicating that Orthomerus, though a possible hadrosaurid, was more likely placed more basal in the Hadrosauroidea, close to Gilmoreosaurus and Bactrosaurus in the evolutionary tree, outside of the Hadrosauridae.

== Paleobiology ==
As a hadrosaurid, Orthomerus would have been a bipedal/quadrupedal herbivore, eating plants with a set of ever-replacing teeth placed in jaw bones with limited mobility that provided grinding action.

== See also ==
- Timeline of hadrosaur research
