= Riabininohadros =

Riabininohadros Temporal range: Late Cretaceous, 72–66 Ma

Scientific classification
- Kingdom: Animalia
- Phylum: Chordata
- Class: Reptilia
- Clade: Dinosauria
- Clade: †Ornithischia
- Clade: †Ornithopoda
- Clade: †Ankylopollexia
- Genus: †Riabininohadros; Lopatin & Averianov, 2020
- Species: †R. weberae

Binomial name
- †Riabininohadros weberae (Riabinin, 1945) Lopatin & Averianov, 2020

Synonyms
- Orthomerus weberi Riabinin, 1945; Orthomerus weberae (Riabinin, 1945) Nessov, 1995

Extinct genus of dinosaurs

Riabininohadros (meaning "Riabinin's hadrosaur") is an extinct genus of ankylopollexian dinosaur from the Maastrichtian of Crimea. Its type species is Riabininohadros weberi, emended to Riabininohadros weberae. It was originally classified as a species of Orthomerus, until 2015.

== Discovery and history ==
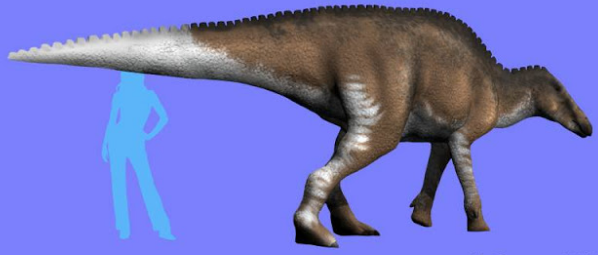
Restored as a hadrosaur

It was originally named Orthomerus weberi when first described by Anatoly Nikolaevich Riabinin in 1945 for hindlimb elements from an unnamed Maastrichtian-age formation in Crimea of what is now Ukraine. These were in 1934 near Bakhchysarai found by Gertruda Weber who is honoured in the specific name. The find was in 1937 reported in the scientific literature. As Weber was female, Lev Nesov in 1995 emended the name to Orthomerus weberae so the ending of the species name was also feminine. Although tossed as a nomen dubium in recent reviews of Hadrosauridae, it was informally given its own genus "Riabininohadros" by Russian amateur paleontologist Roman Ulansky. As this publication did not meet the requirements of the International Code of Zoological Nomenclature, "Riabininohadros" was not a valid name for the taxon until the name was formally published as new by Lopatin and Averianov in 2020.

The holotype, specimen ZGTM 5751, was found alongside the remains of an unnamed member of Styracosterna in an unnamed Late Cretaceous (Maastrichtian)-aged marine deposit at Mt. Besh-Kosh in Crimea in a Belemnella casimirovensis ammonoid zone. It largely consists of a left hindlimb, including the thighbone, the shinbone, the calf bone, the astragalus, the calcaneus, the second and third metatarsal and the first phalanx of the second toe. In 2018, it transpired that Riabinin had misidentified several elements. Also a part of the right calf bone proved to be present. A postcranial juvenile skeleton in 1965 excavated at Aleshino, was considered to represent a different species, a hadrosaurid.

== Classification ==
As Orthomerus has typically been classified within or very close to Hadrosauridae, Riabininohadros weberae was placed similarly by reviews of the family. However, as discussed by Lopatin and Averianov in 2020, the femur of Riabininohadros is very distinctive, and has no morphological equivalents within Iguanodontia, the clade that includes hadrosaurs and their relatives. Instead, Lopatin and Averianov, in view of its basal astragalus, classified Riabininohadros as a primitive member of the Ankylopollexia, more specially the Styracosterna, well outside Hadrosauroidea, with uncertain relationships to other taxa in the clade.

== See also ==
- Timeline of hadrosaur research
