= Trochiliscaceae =

Trochiliscaceae Temporal range: Devonian

Scientific classification
- Clade: Viridiplantae
- (unranked): Charophyta
- Class: Charophyceae
- Order: †Trochiliscales
- Family: †Trochiliscaceae

Genera
- See text.

Extinct family of algae

Trochiliscaceae is a family of fossil charophyte green algae. It is the only member of the order Trochiliscales. The reproductive structures in Trochiliscaceae (and families placed in Sycidiales by AlgaeBase) have a calcified cover, called a utricle, that is thought to prevent the zygote being desiccated. Other Paleozoic families lack this cover, as do modern charophytes. Fossils of Trochiliscaceae are from the Devonian.

== Genera ==
As of February 2022, AlgaeBase accepted the following genera.

- †Karpinskya (Croft) Grambast – 2 species
- †Moellerina E.O.Ulrich – 3 species
- †Primochara T.A.Istchenko & Saidakovsky – 2 species
- †Trochiliscus Karpinsky – 7 species
