= Anatoly Riabinin =

Russian paleontologist (1874–1942)

Anatoly Nikolaevich Riabinin
- Born: 11 June 1874; Murom, Russian Empire
- Died: 2 February 1942 (aged 69); Leningrad, Soviet Union
- Occupation: Paleontologist

Anatoly Riabinin (11 June 1874 – 2 February 1942) was a Russian and Soviet geologist and vertebrate paleontologist.

In the 1910s, Riabinin led the first paleontological expeditions to the Amur (in 1914 and 1916–17). The hadrosaurid Amurosaurus riabinini is named for him. In 1925, he described the first dinosaur from China (though excavated in 1914). It initially bore the name Trachodon amurense, though he renamed it Mandschurosaurus in 1930. He also conducted studies on fossilised turtles. In 2020, the ornithopod dinosaur genus known as Riabininohadros was named for him.

In 1942, he perished during the Siege of Leningrad. Several of his works were posthumously published in the late 1940s (publications appeared in 1945 and 1946). He thus described Batrachognathus in 1948.

== Links ==
- Equatorial Minnesota
- List of publications
