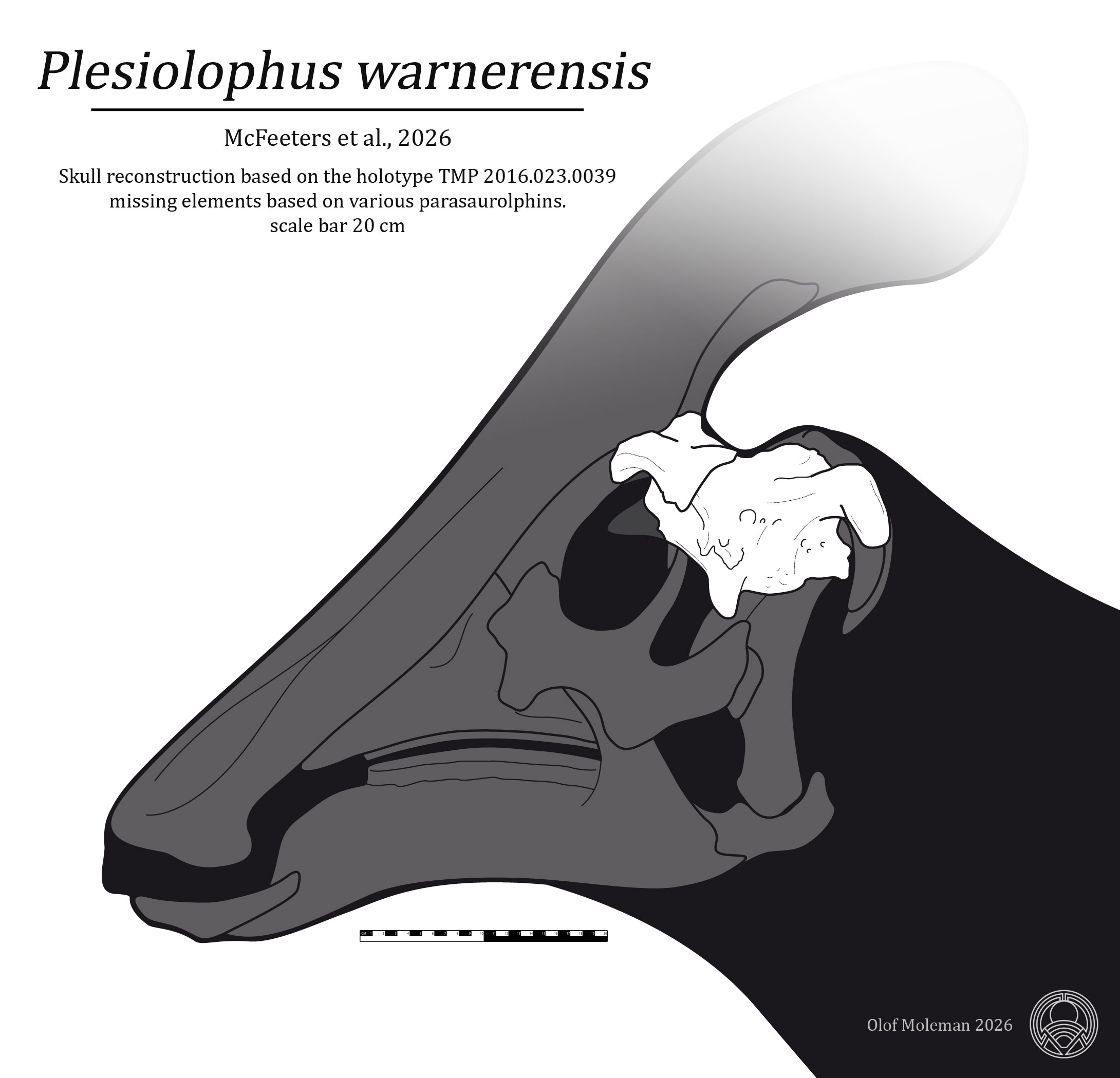
- Hypothetical skull reconstruction of Plesiolophus

Scientific classification
- Kingdom: Animalia
- Phylum: Chordata
- Class: Reptilia
- Clade: Dinosauria
- Clade: †Ornithischia
- Clade: †Ornithopoda
- Family: †Hadrosauridae
- Subfamily: †Lambeosaurinae
- Tribe: †Parasaurolophini
- Genus: †Plesiolophus; McFeeters et al., 2026
- Species: †P. warnerensis

Binomial name
- †Plesiolophus warnerensis McFeeters et al., 2026

= Plesiolophus =

Plesiolophus Temporal range: Late Cretaceous, Campanian

Genus of hadrosaurid dinosaur

Plesiolophus (lit. 'near crest') is an extinct genus of lambeosaurine hadrosaurid dinosaur known from the Late Cretaceous (Campanian age) Oldman Formation of Canada. The genus contains a single species, Plesiolophus warnerensis, known from a partial skull. It belongs to the clade Parasaurolophini, where it exhibits more primitive cranial characters than its relatives.

== Discovery and naming ==
The Plesiolophus fossil material was discovered by Wendy Sloboda in the outcrops of the Oldman Formation, part of the Belly River Group, near Warner, Alberta, Canada. The specimen is housed in the Royal Tyrrell Museum of Palaeontology, where it is permanently accessioned as specimen TMP 2016.023.0039. It consists of a partial skull, including the posterior skull roof and braincase.

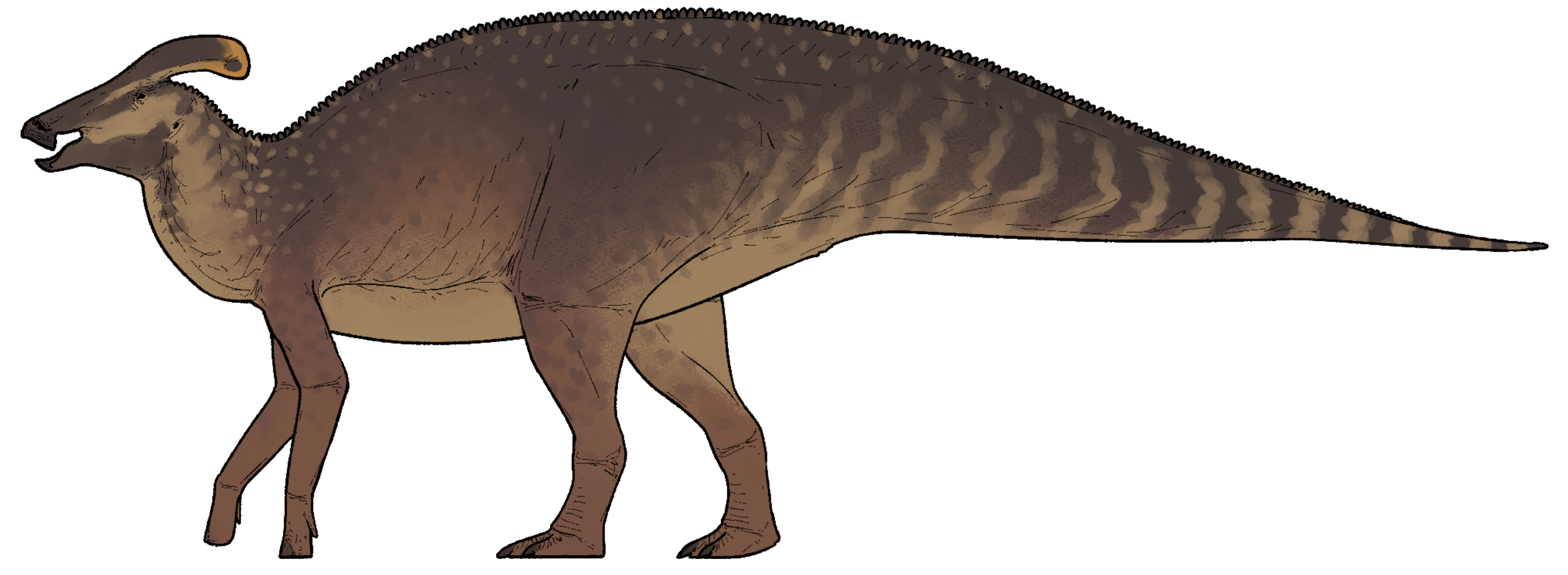
Life restoration

In 2026, Bradley D. McFeeters and colleagues described Plesiolophus warnerensis as a new genus and species of hadrosaurid dinosaur based on these fossil remains, establishing TMP 2016.023.0039 as the holotype specimen. The generic name, Plesiolophus, combines the Ancient Greek words πλησ´ιoν, meaning 'near', and λόϕoς, meaning 'crest', in reference to the phylogenetic proximity of this taxon to Parasaurolophus, but its retention of more plesiomorphic ('primitive') anatomy. The specific name, warnerensis, references the discovery of the specimen in Warner, Alberta.

== Classification ==
To test the affinities and relationships of Plesiolophus, McFeeters et al. (2026) included it in an updated version of the phylogenetic matrix of Ramírez Velasco (2022). Their strict consensus tree, which obtained better-resolved results, recovered the Asian Charonosaurus as the earliest-diverging member of the lambeosaurine clade Parasaurolophini. It is followed by an exclusively North American clade, of which Plesiolophus is the basalmost member. These results are displayed in the cladogram below:

- Euhadrosauria
  - Saurolophinae
  - Lambeosaurinae
    - Aralosaurus tuberiferus
    - - Tsintaosaurini
      - - Jaxartosaurus aralensis
        - - Canardia garonnensis
          - - Lambeosaurini
            - Parasaurolophini
              - Charonosaurus jiayinensis
              - - Plesiolophus warnerensis
                - - - Adelolophus hutchisoni
                    - Tlatolophus galorum
                  - Parasaurolophus
                    - P. walkeri
                    - - P. cyrtocristatus
                      - P. tubicen
