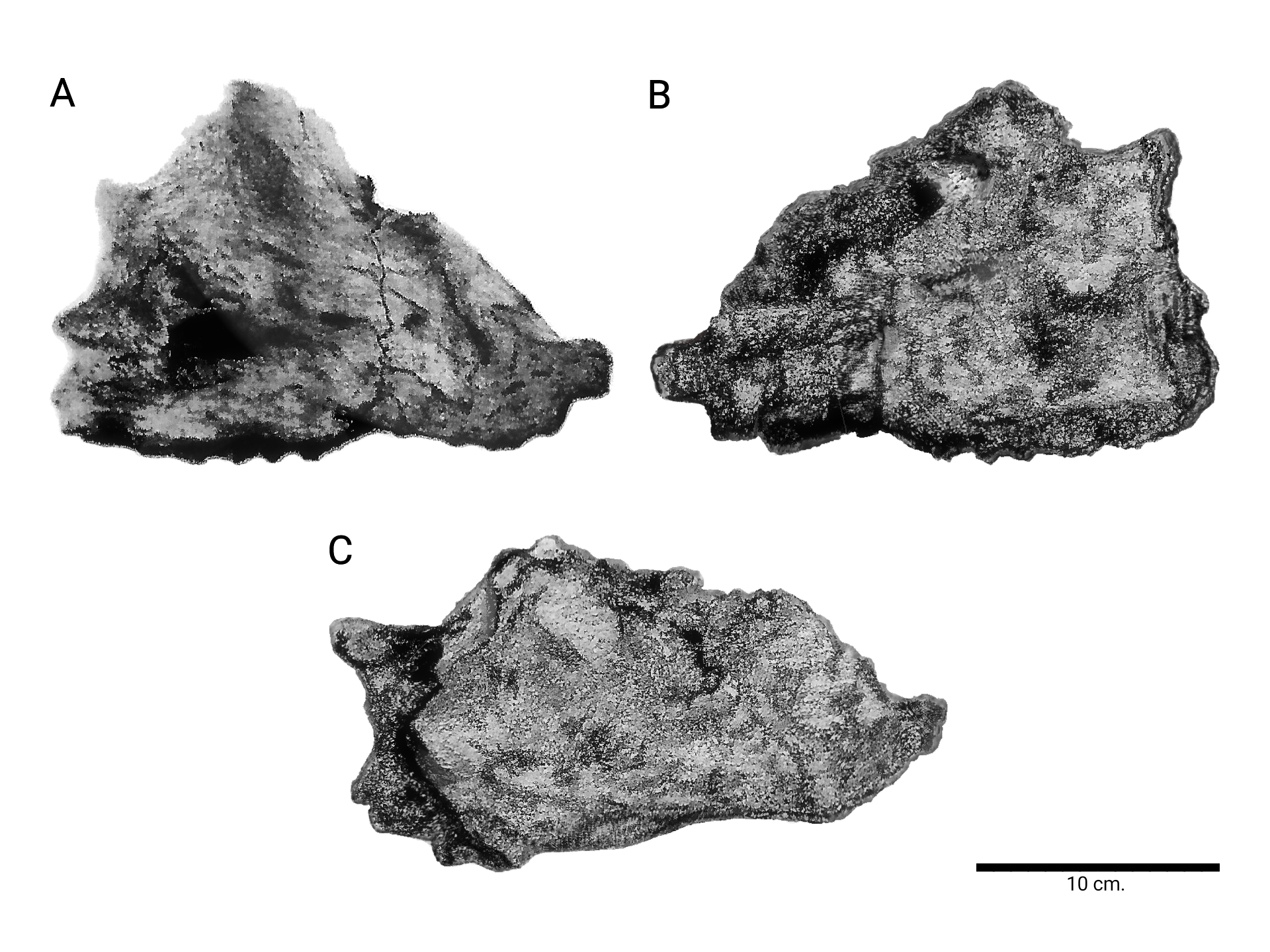
- Drawing of the holotype specimen

Scientific classification
- Kingdom: Animalia
- Phylum: Chordata
- Class: Reptilia
- Clade: Dinosauria
- Clade: †Ornithischia
- Clade: †Ornithopoda
- Family: †Hadrosauridae
- Subfamily: †Lambeosaurinae
- Tribe: †Parasaurolophini
- Genus: †Adelolophus; Gates et al., 2014
- Species: †A. hutchisoni

Binomial name
- †Adelolophus hutchisoni Gates et al., 2014

= Adelolophus =

Adelolophus Temporal range: Late Cretaceous, 78 Ma

Extinct genus of dinosaurs

Adelolophus (meaning "unknown crest") is a genus of lambeosaurine dinosaur (a crested "duck-bill") from Upper Cretaceous rocks in the U.S. state of Utah. The type and only known species is A. hutchisoni; the type specimen consists only of a broken maxilla. It constitutes the oldest known lambeosaur remains from North America, as well as the only known lambeosaur species from the Wahweap Formation, of which it pertains to the Upper Member. Among its relatives, it seems to be particularly similar to Parasaurolophus, rather than animals like Lambeosaurus; phylogenetic analysis confirms this, finding it in Parasaurolophini (tube-headed lambeosaurs). It would have lived in a wet environment, bordering on the sea but with a more arid season during some times of the year. This environment would have been shared with a diverse variety of fish and turtles, as well as other dinosaurs like ceratopsids and tyrannosaurids.

== Discovery and naming ==
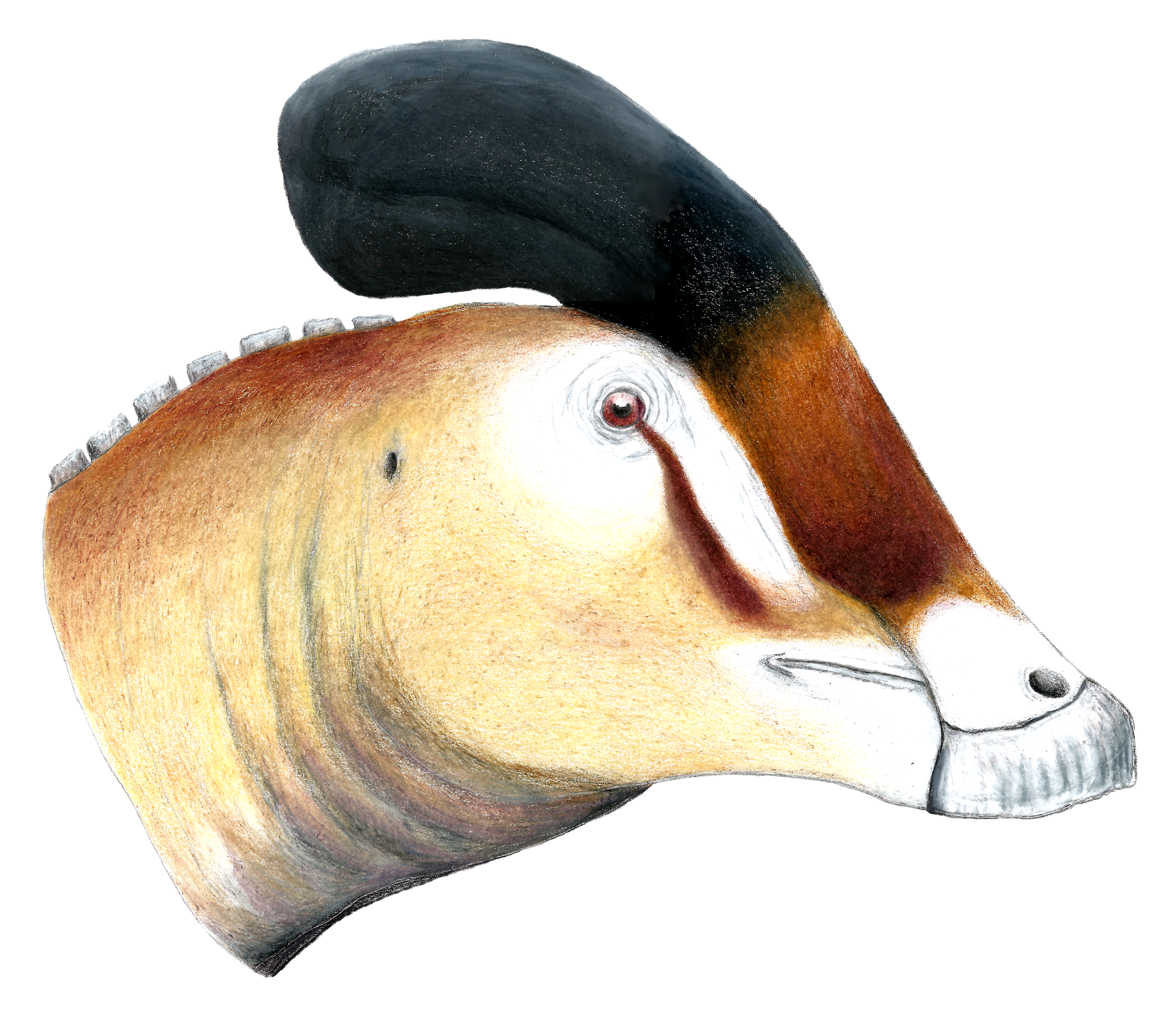
Speculative restoration of the head

A fossil bearing locality near Death Ridge in Kane County, Utah, was first reported in 1973 by Howard D. Zeller; this locality is part of the Wahweap Formation, found within the Grand Staircase–Escalante National Monument area. The information reported by Zeller would be used by John Howard Hutchison and colleagues to return there to collect fossils in 1999. Among these was the maxilla (a jawbone) of a lambeosaurine hadrosaur. This maxilla was first reported in 2013, in a paper by Terry Gates and colleagues. It was noted as the only known lambeosaur material from the formation (reported as being from the Upper Member), and the oldest known lambeosaur material in North America. They suggested the unique morphology indicated it was a new taxon, but refrained from naming it.

Later, the specimen was described and named in a 2014 study, again led by Terry Gates, published as part of the book Hadrosaurs. The new species was given the name Adelolophus hutchisoni. The holotype is UCMP 152028, an incomplete right maxilla with both ends broken off. The generic name is derived from Greek α~, "not", δηλόω, "to show" and λόφη, "crest", referring to the known anatomy of the species not showing the presumed crest. The specific name is in honor of Hutchison, who discovered the specimen. The study noted that the exact locality of the specimen was unknown, making its referral to the Upper Member tentative, merely surmised by the rock matrix that had surrounded the specimen. The type locality would be clarified by a 2016 study by Hutchison and Patricia A. Holroyd, confirming it came from the lower end of the Upper Member. It was suggested that the locality may bridge the gap in time between the older Middle Member and younger Upper Member of the formation. Fossils of other animals from the same locality were reported in the paper. Among these were fragmentary hadrosaur postcranial specimens, pertaining to various ages, including one very large individual. While the possibility was noted these could belong to Adelolophus, a referral is impossible to confirm.

== Description ==
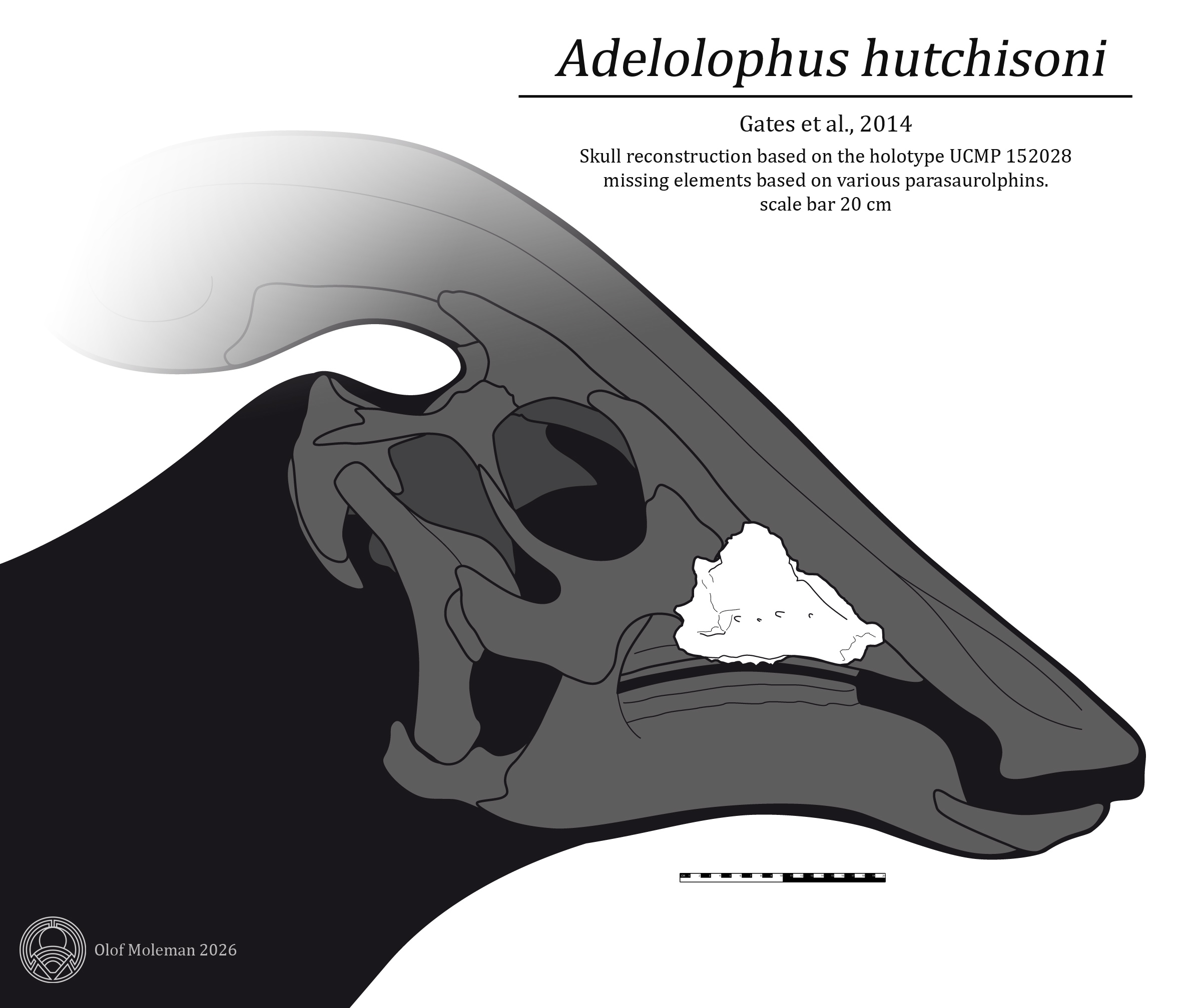
Diagram of known material (white), with skull inferred from relatives

Several unique morphological traits diagnose Adelolophus as a distinct genus, despite its fragmentary nature. The anatomy of the only known bone, the maxilla (part of the upper jaw, bearing teeth), is identifiable as that of a lambeosaur (a type of dinosaur which possessed large, hollow head crests) based on features such as its triangular shape. Among its relatives, its anatomy is more similar to that of parasaurolophs (tube-headed lambeosaurs) rather than lambeosaurins (casque headed lambeosaurs), two closely related types of lambeosaurine. It differs most prominently from other taxa in its very tall medial wall (a ridge situated along the middle, upper edge of the bone), both on the front and back end of the bone. By comparison, lambeosaurins possess a particularly short medial wall, with that of Parasaurolophus showing an intermediate condition between the two.

The dorsal process, a bony upwards extension, is again more similar to that of parasaurolophs, being relatively rounded rather than sharply tapered as in lambeosaurins. The region where the maxilla articulates with the jugal bone seems to indicate a parasauroloph-like jugal as well, though this bone itself was not preserved. Near the back end of the maxilla, another distinguishing trait of Adelolophus is its large, elevated palatine process (a triangular that connects to the palatine bone); in other lambeosaurs, it is smaller and lower on the maxilla. The shape of the bottom edge of the bone, along the toothrow, is drastically different from other North American relatives, including Parasaurolophus; it is rugose and has protrusions, rather than the more usual smooth condition. Running from the jugal articulation to the palatine process, Adelolophus possesses a unique, thickened ridge, also unique among lambeosaurs.

== Classification ==
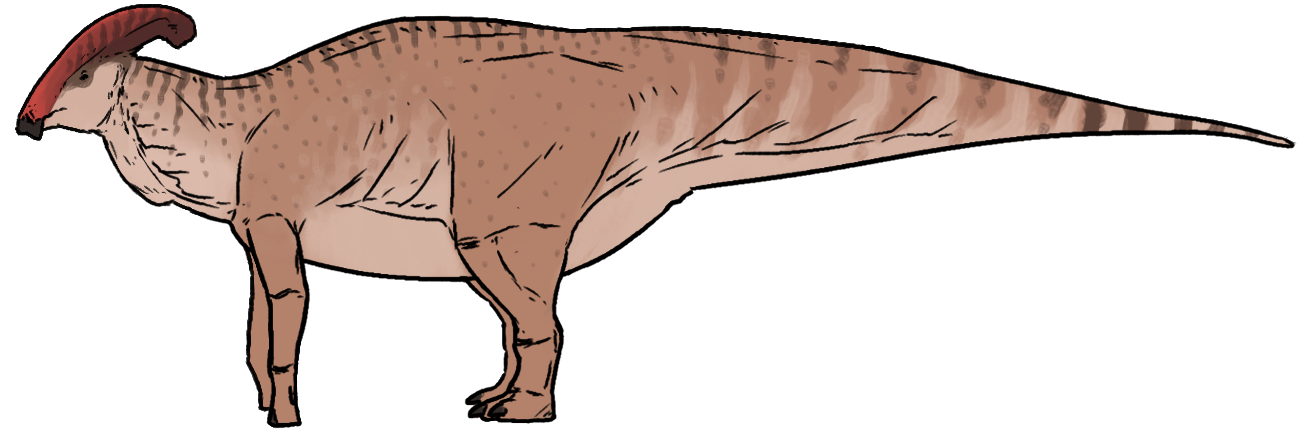
Adelolophus restored with a crest similar to that of the closely related Parasaurolophus

Adelolophus is a member of the lambeosaur subfamily of the family Hadrosauridae. Its phylogenetic position was not tested more precisely in its original description paper. A 2021 study by Nicholas Longrich and colleagues included Adelolophus in a phylogenetic analysis (test of its relation to other hadrosaurs) and found it to be a member of the tribe Parasaurolophini. Close relatives would have included Parasaurolophus and Charonosaurus. The cladogram from Longrich et al. (2021) is reproduced below:

- Hadrosauridae
  - Saurolophinae
  - Lambeosaurinae
    - Aralosaurus
    - - Jaxartosaurus
      - - Nipponosaurus
        - - Tsintaosaurus
          - - Arenysaurini
            - - Parasaurolophini
                - Angulomastacator
                - - Adelolophus
                  - - Charonosaurus
                    - Parasaurolophus
              - Lambeosaurini

A more expansive study reinforced the position within Parasaurolophini, placing it sister to the unusual Tlatolophus.

== Paleoenvironment ==
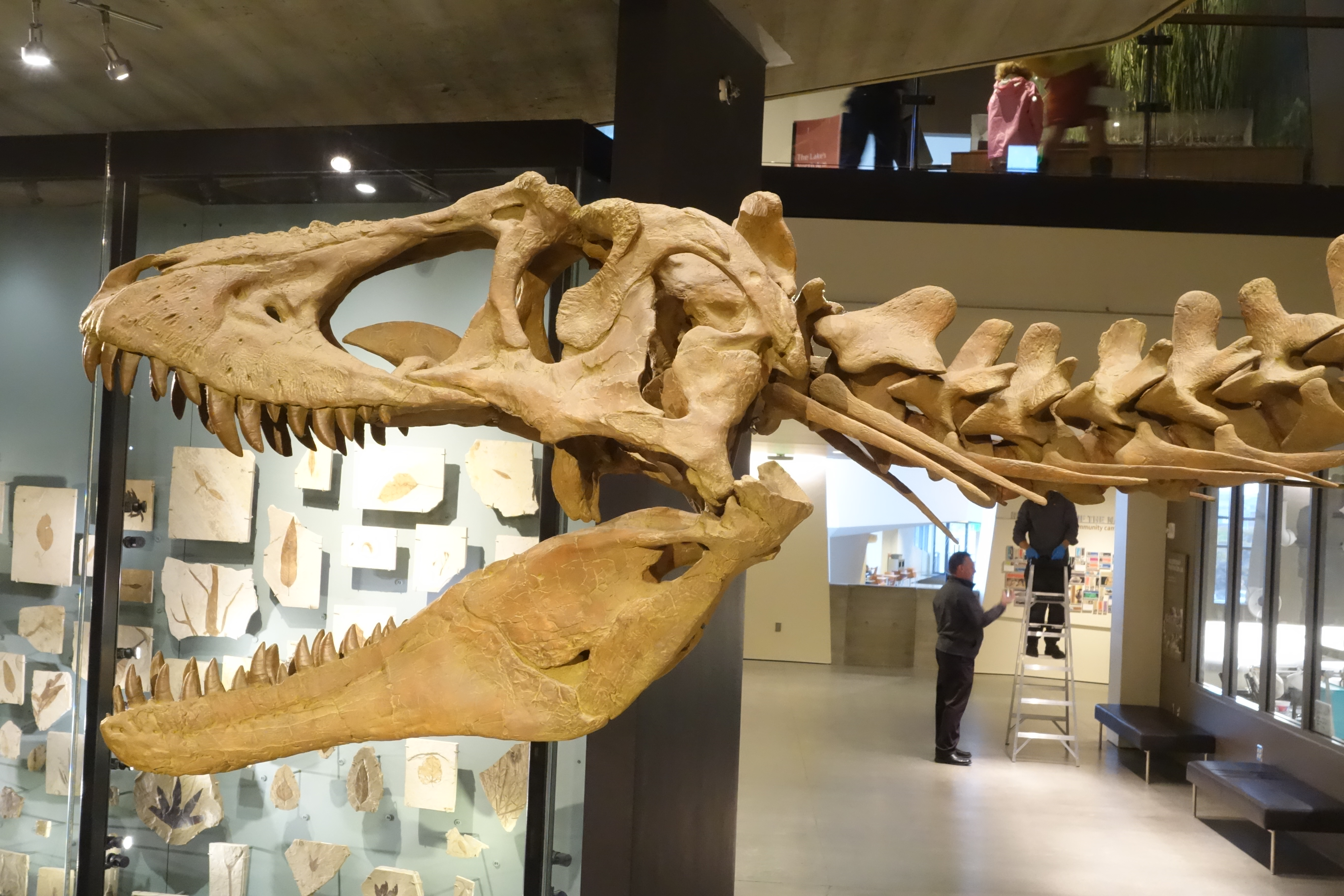
Skull of the tyrannosaurid Lythronax

Adelolophus pertains to the Upper Member of the Wahweap Formation, which is dated to the early Campanian age. The formation is composed of mudstone and sandstone. The environment of the Upper Member was tidal, characterized by meandering rivers. Compared to the lower members, the Upper Member had a more marine influence, caused by the encroaching Western Interior Seaway. This created an estuarine environment with brackish water. Despite the generally wet climate, a dry season would have been present.

The fossil remains of numerous other animals from the locality the holotype was found paint a picture of what animals Adelolophus would have lived alongside. Fish present include indeterminate sturgeon and gar specimens, as well as better remains of the large bowfin fish Melvius. Turtles of the extinct baenid family are abundant at the site; these include Arvinachelys, Denazinemys, Neurankylus, and additional remains not identifiable to the level of species. Gars, Melvius, and baenid turtles are all common throughout the Wahweap Formation. The Nanhsiungchelyid turtle Basilemys and indeterminate trionychid turtle specimens were also reported. Mesosuchian remains have been documented; this is significant, as fossils of the group are rarely found in the formation. Lastly, fragmentary remains of a tyrannosaurid theropod were found at the site. The tyrannosaur Lythronax is known from the Middle Member of the Wahweap Formation, but the tyrannosaur remains from the Adelolophus locality are non-diagnostic, so whether they belong to the taxon cannot be determined. Ceratopsid dinosaur Machairoceratops is also from the Upper Member.

== See also ==
- Timeline of hadrosaur research
