= Anatoly Rozhdestvensky =

Anatoly Konstantinovich Rozhdestvensky (Russian: Анатолий Константинович Рождественский, 1920–1983) was a Soviet paleontologist responsible for naming many dinosaurs, including Aralosaurus and Probactrosaurus.
