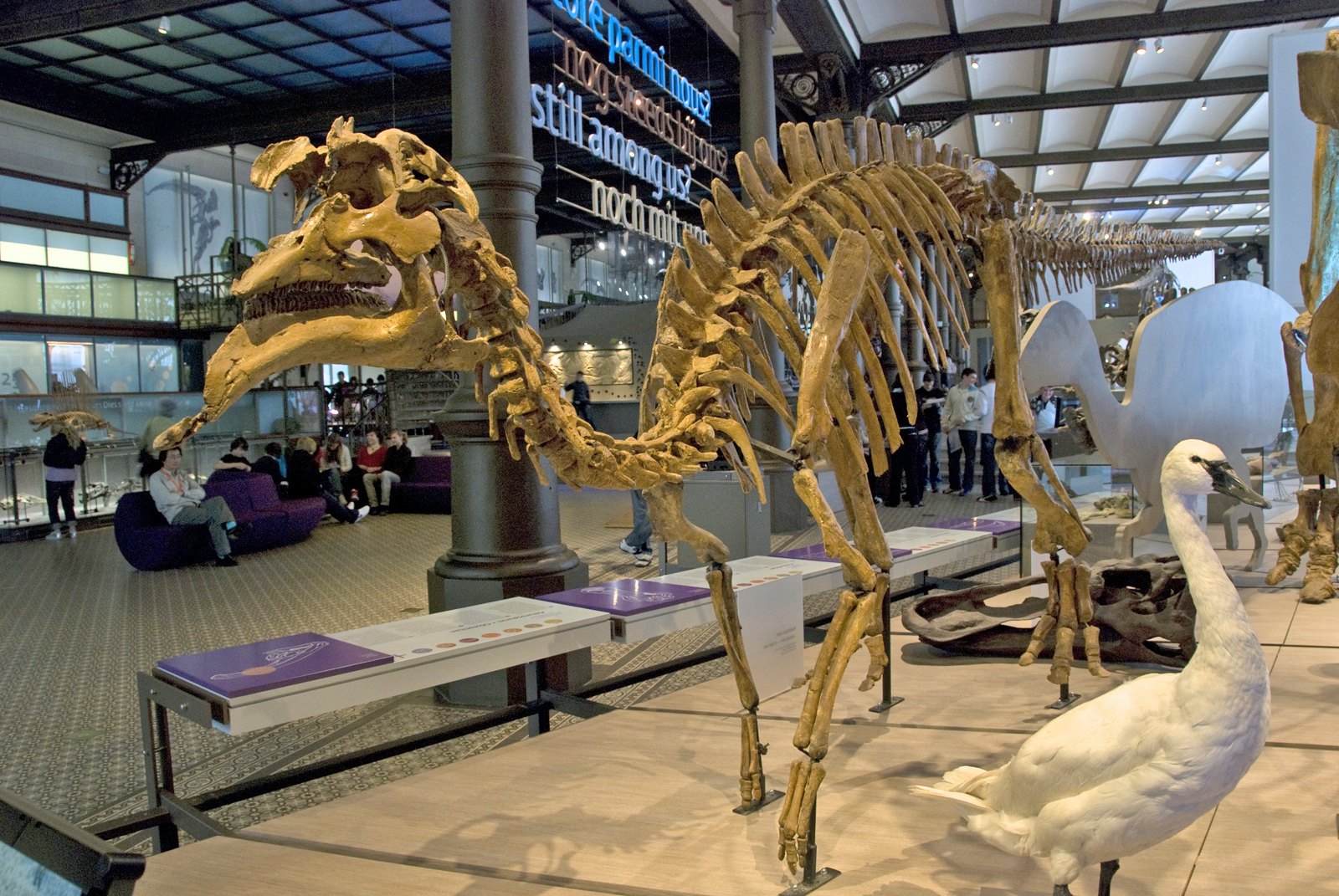
- Replica skeleton, Brussels

Scientific classification
- Kingdom: Animalia
- Phylum: Chordata
- Class: Reptilia
- Clade: Dinosauria
- Clade: †Ornithischia
- Clade: †Ornithopoda
- Family: †Hadrosauridae
- Clade: †Euhadrosauria
- Subfamily: †Lambeosaurinae
- Genus: †Amurosaurus; Bolotsky & Kurzanov, 1991
- Species: †A. riabinini

Binomial name
- †Amurosaurus riabinini Bolotsky & Kurzanov, 1991

Synonyms
- Sahaliyania Godefroit et al., 2008

= Amurosaurus =

Amurosaurus Temporal range: Late Cretaceous, 70–66 Ma

Extinct genus of dinosaurs

Amurosaurus (/əˌmʊərəˈsɔːrəs/; "Amur lizard") is a genus of lambeosaurine hadrosaurid dinosaur found in Late Cretaceous (70 to 66 million years ago) deposits of what is now eastern Asia.

== Discovery and naming ==
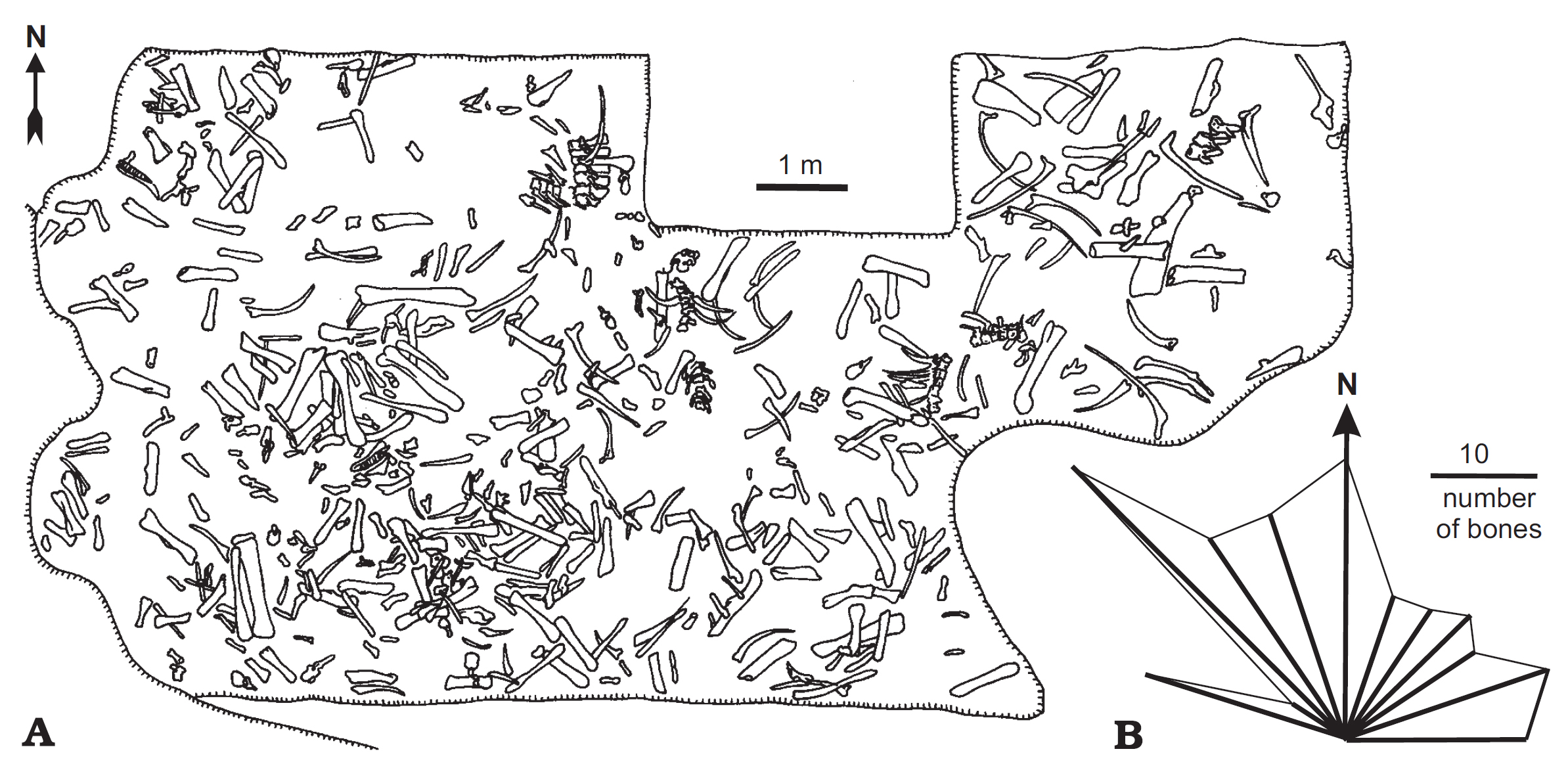
Bonebed at Blagoveschensk dinosaur locality

Russian paleontologists Yuri Bolotsky and Sergei Kurzanov first described and named this dinosaur in 1991. The generic name is derived from the Amur River and the Greek word sauros ("lizard"). The Amur (called Heilongjiang or "Black Dragon River" in Chinese) forms the border of Russia and China, and is near where this dinosaur's remains were found. There is one known species (A. riabinini), named in honor of the late Russian paleontologist Anatoly Riabinin, who conducted the first Russian expeditions to recover dinosaur remains in the Amur region in 1916 and 1917.

All fossils of Amurosaurus have been recovered from a single bonebed locality, discovered in 1984 within the city limits of Blagoveschensk in the Amur Oblast of far eastern Russia. This bonebed is found in the Udurchukan Formation, the oldest geologic formation in the Tsagayan Group of far eastern Russia and northeastern China. This formation is thought to belong to the Maastrichtian stage of the Late Cretaceous Period, and was deposited about 68 million years ago, or just prior to the Lancian faunal stage of North America. The sediments were laid down in the floodplain of a river, which transported the fossils, but only a short distance, judging by the randomly assorted, disarticulated, but well-preserved bones within the bonebed, including fragile skull elements. Only a small section of the bonebed has been uncovered, but 90% of the remains found so far belong to lambeosaurines like Amurosaurus, mostly juveniles, with the rest belonging to other taxa, such as the hadrosaurine Kerberosaurus. Theropod teeth are also abundant, and there are many toothmarks on the bones, made by predators or scavengers. This bonebed containing many specimens was unearthed in 2008.

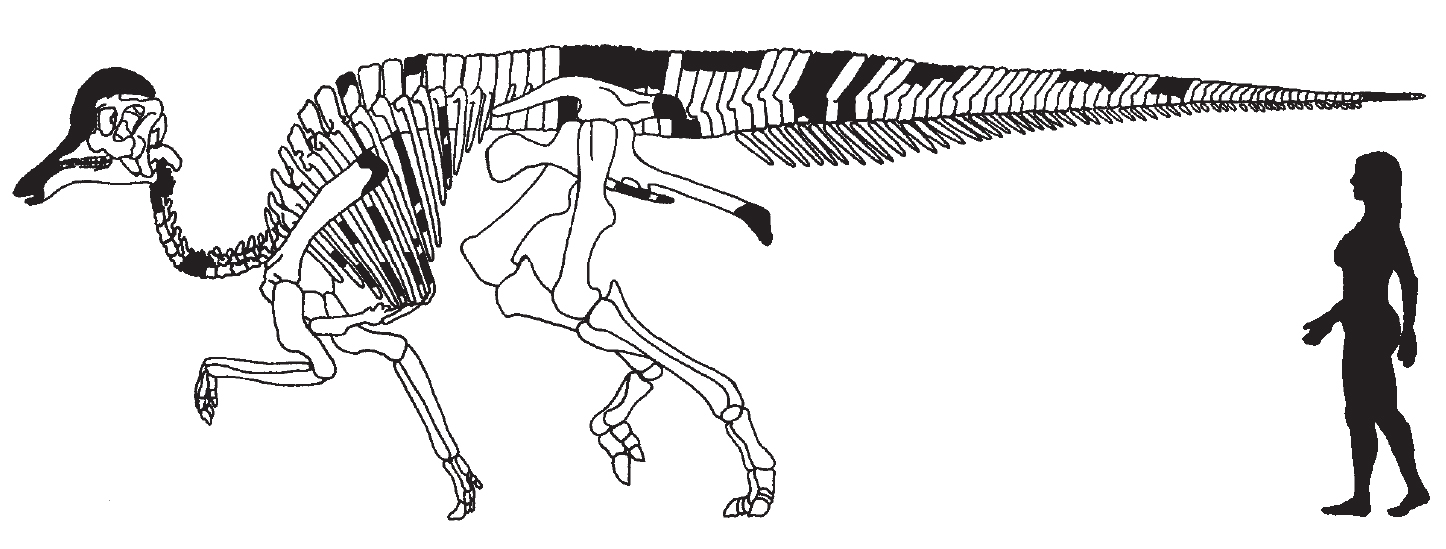
Skeletal diagram

The holotype, or original specimen, consists of only a maxilla (upper jaw bone), and a dentary (lower jaw bone), both from the left side of the same individual. However, most of the other bones of the skull and skeleton have also been preserved in the bonebed, albeit of many different individuals. This other material was described more recently, making Amurosaurus the most abundant and completely known Russian dinosaur.

A pathological ulna of a specimen referred to the species, preserved with a hypertrophied and swollen distal region and with the distal articular surface engulfed within a large overgrowth of newly formed bone, was described by Bertozzo et al. (2023), who interpreted the bone as still healing prior to the animal's death, with the misalignment of the fracture and the resulting malunion of the two fragments of the bone probably causing the animal to limp and walk on three limbs.

=== Sahaliyania ===
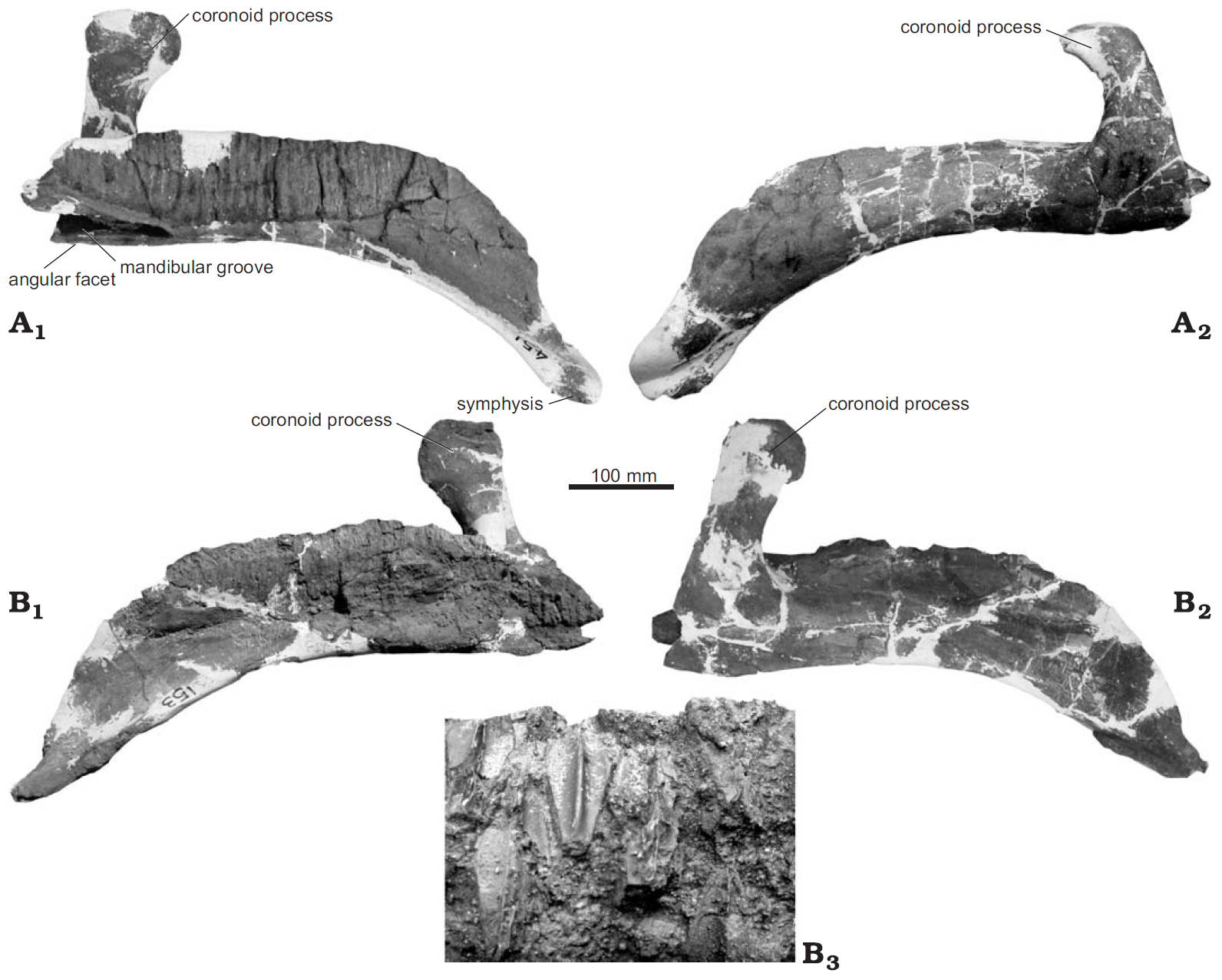
Lower jaws and teeth

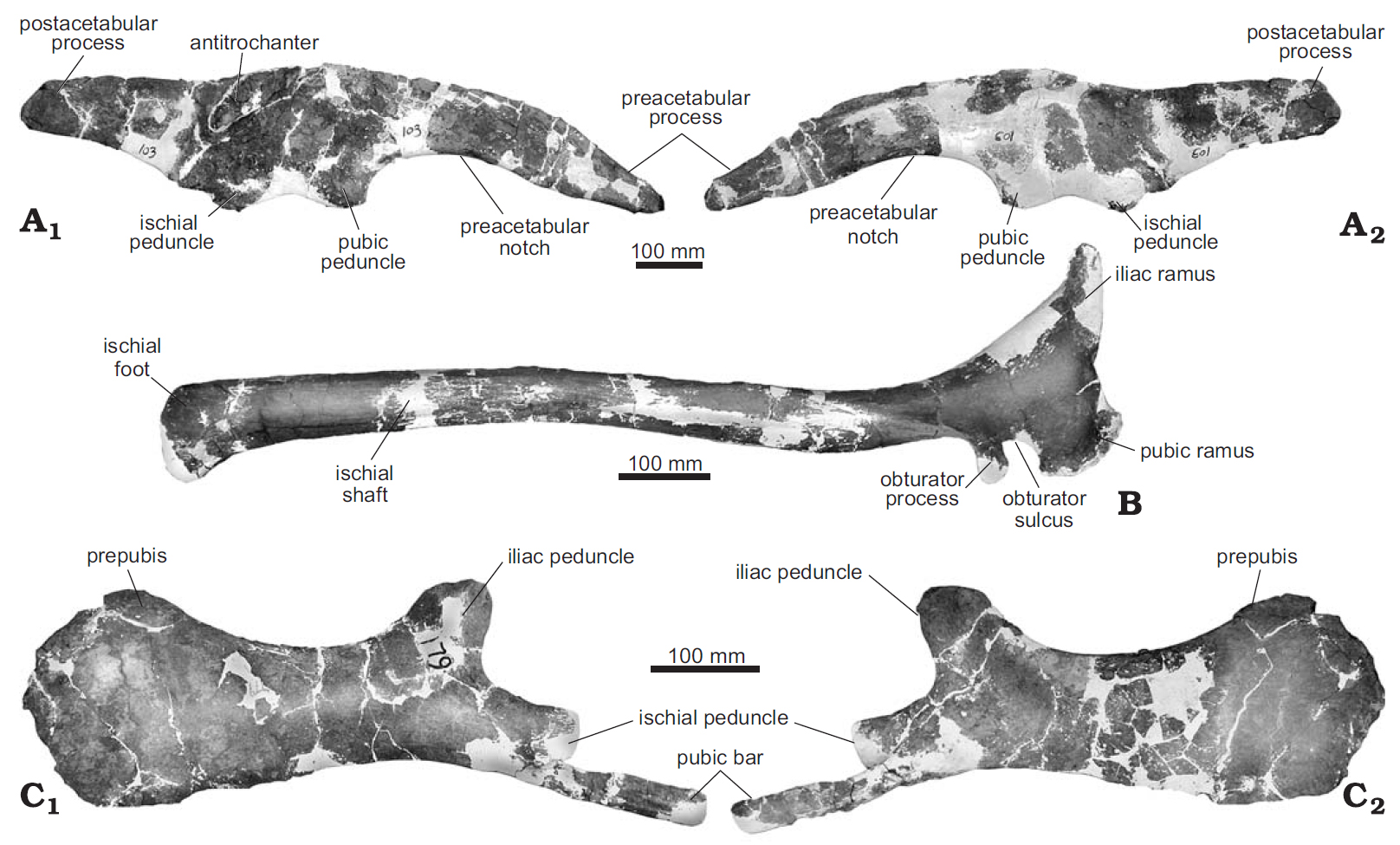
Hip bones

Sahaliyania (from "black" in Manchu, a reference to the Amur/Heilongjiang River), is a junior synonym of Amurosaurus. Its remains were found in a bonebed in the Maastrichtian-age Yuliangze Formation, alongside rarer remains of the hadrosaurine hadrosaurid (flat-headed duckbill) Wulagasaurus. Sahaliyania was named by Pascal Godefroit and colleagues in 2008. The type and only species is S. elunchunorum, named in honor of the Elunchun people.

Sahaliyania was based on GMH W453, a partial skull. Godefroit and colleagues assigned numerous other fossils from the bonebed to their new genus, representing much of the skull, pectoral girdle, upper arm, and pelvis. It can be distinguished from other hadrosaurids by a variety of anatomical details. Godefroit and colleagues performed a phylogenetic analysis that places Sahaliyania as a lambeosaurine of uncertain relationships. A 2022 article reassessed Sahaliyania and considered it a junior synonym of Amurosaurus.

== Description ==
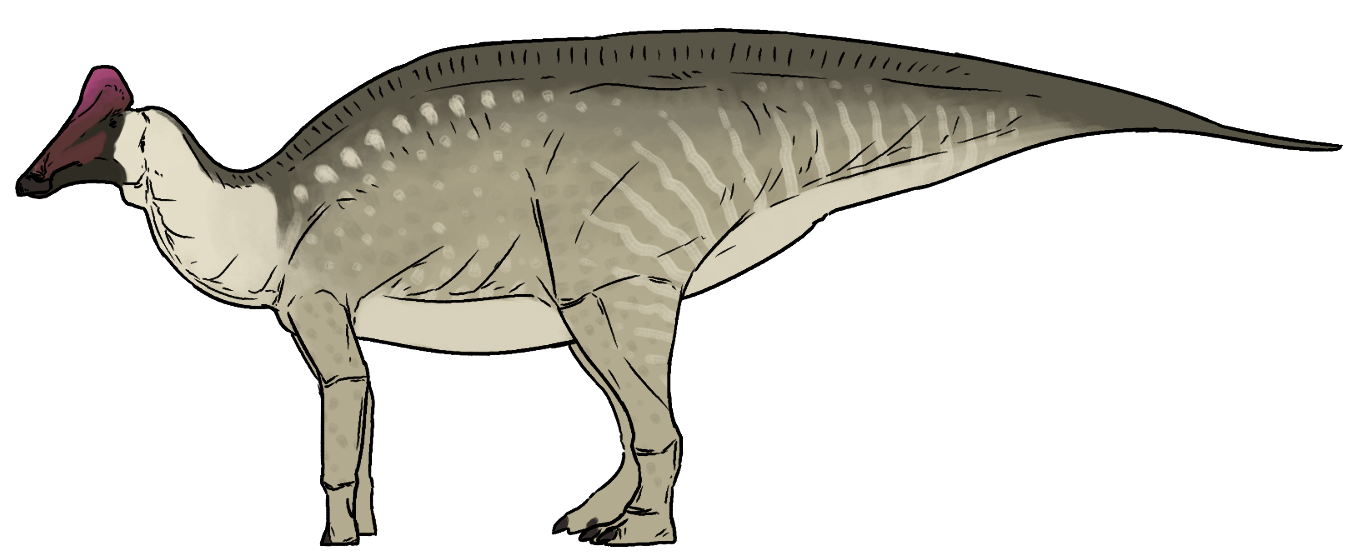
Life restoration

Amurosaurus is characterized by many autapomorphies, or unique features, of the skull, as well as the sigmoidal shape of the ulna (the lower arm bone) when viewed from the front or side. Most other known lambeosaurines have hollow crests on the top of their skulls, and although the bones that would make up such a crest are unknown for this dinosaur, the bones on the roof of the skull are modified to support one, so it can be assumed that Amurosaurus was crested as well. It has been estimated at 8 metres (26 ft) in length and about 3 metric tons (3.0 long tons; 3.3 short tons) in weight. As a hadrosaurid, Amurosaurus would have been herbivorous.

== Classification ==
Restored skull, National Natural History Museum of China

The following cladogram on the left shows the results of a phylogenetic analysis of lambeosaur relationships from a 2013 study by Albert Prieto-Márquez and colleagues, showing Amurosaurus as a derived member of the tribe Lambeosaurini. The cladogram on the right depicts the results from a 2014 study by Yuri Bolotsky and colleagues; this study incorporated novel skull material of Amurosaurus which they found to indicate a more primitive spot among lambeosaurs.

- Lambeosaurinae
  - Aralosaurini
  - - Jaxartosaurus
    - - Tsintaosaurini
      - - Parasaurolophini
          - Charonosaurus
          - Parasaurolophus
        - Lambeosaurini
          - Lambeosaurus
          - Corythosaurus
          - - "Hypacrosaurus" stebingeri
            - - Hypacrosaurus
              - Olorotitan
              - - Arenysaurus
                - Blasisaurus
              - - Magnapaulia
                - - Velafrons
                  - - Amurosaurus
                    - Sahaliyania

- - Gryposaurus
  - Lambeosaurinae
    - Aralosaurus
    - - - Tsintaosaurus
        - Pararhabdodon
      - - Jaxartosaurus
        - - Arenysaurus
          - - Amurosaurus
            - - Parasaurolophini
                - Charonosaurus
                - Parasaurolophus
              - Lambeosaurini
                - Lambeosaurus
                - - Olorotitan
                  - - Corythosaurus
                    - Hypacrosaurus

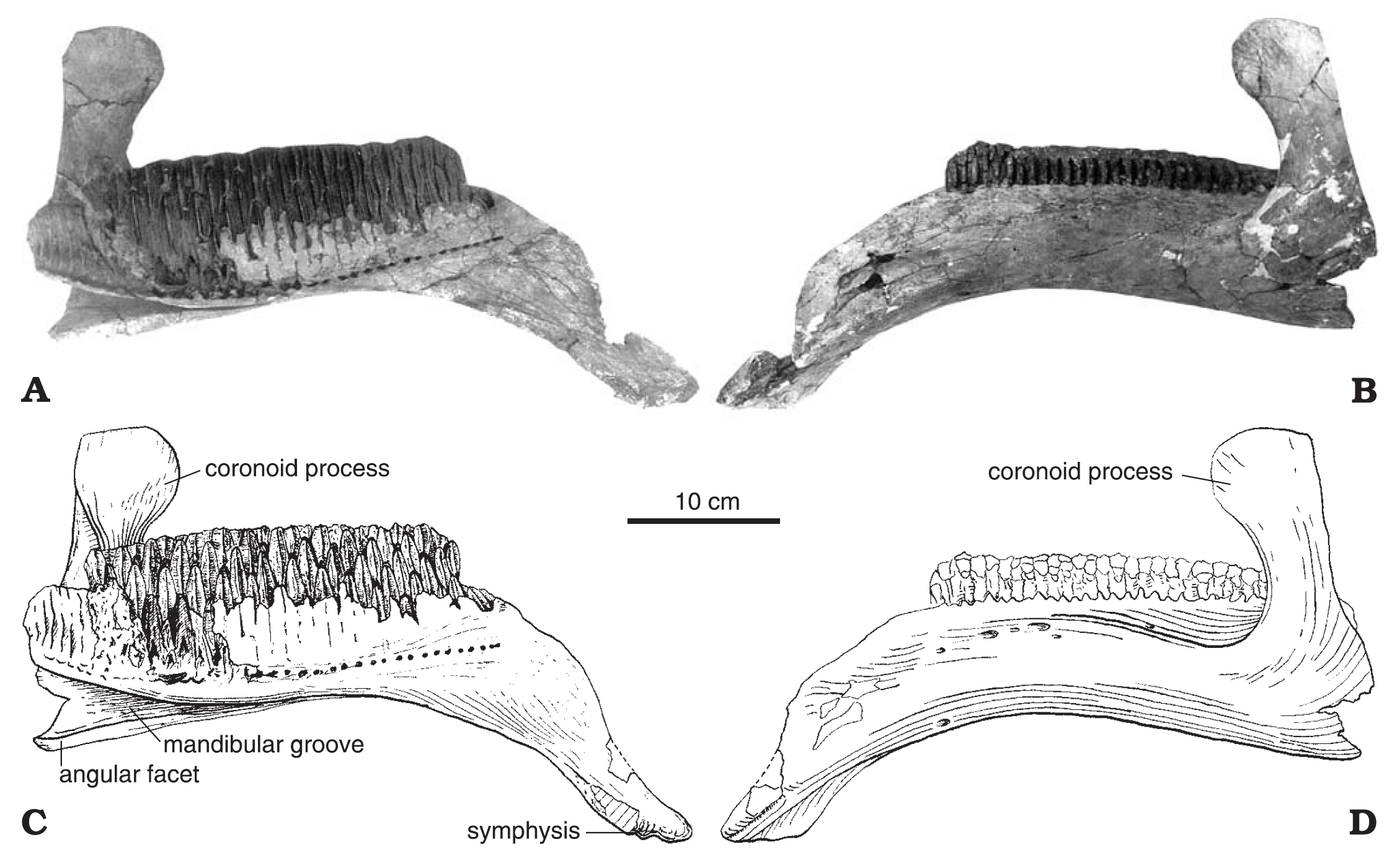
Lower jaw of the holotype

The 2020 osteological description of the material previously constituting the distinct genus Sahaliyania found the latter genus to be a synonym of Amurosaurus, allowing its newly restudied material to contribute to more robust tests of the classification of Amurosaurus. With this new data, Amurosaurus was found to be a derived member of Lambeosaurinae closely related to Lambeosaurus, something that had been recovered in some previous studies. The cladogram from this study is reproduced below:

- - Xuwulong
  - - Bactrosaurus
    - - Telmatosaurus
      - - - Gryposaurus
          - Edmontosaurus
        - Lambeosaurinae
          - Aralosaurini
            - Canardia
            - Aralosaurus
          - - Tsintaosaurini
              - Pararhabdodon
              - Tsintaosaurus
            - - Jaxartosaurus
              - - Arenysaurini
                  - Blasisaurus
                  - Arenysaurus
                - Corythosauria
                  - Parasaurolophus
                    - Parasaurolophus cyrtocristatus
                    - - "Charonosaurus" jiayinensis
                      - - Parasaurolophus tubicen
                        - Parasaurolophus walkeri
                  - Lambeosaurini
                    - Olorotitan
                    - - Velafrons
                      - - - Amurosaurus
                          - Lambeosaurus
                            - Lambeosaurus clavinitialis
                            - - Lambeosaurus magnicristatus
                              - Lambeosaurus lambei
                        - - Corythosaurus
                            - Corythosaurus intermedius
                            - Corythosaurus casuarius
                          - Hypacrosaurus
                            - Hypacrosaurus altispinus
                            - - "Magnapaulia" laticaudus
                              - Hypacrosaurus stebingeri

== Palaeobiology ==
Amurosaurus had a high encephalisation quotient relative to sauropods and ceratopsians although lower than that of theropods, as would be expected of an animal that likely engaged in complex social behaviours.

== See also ==
- Timeline of hadrosaur research
