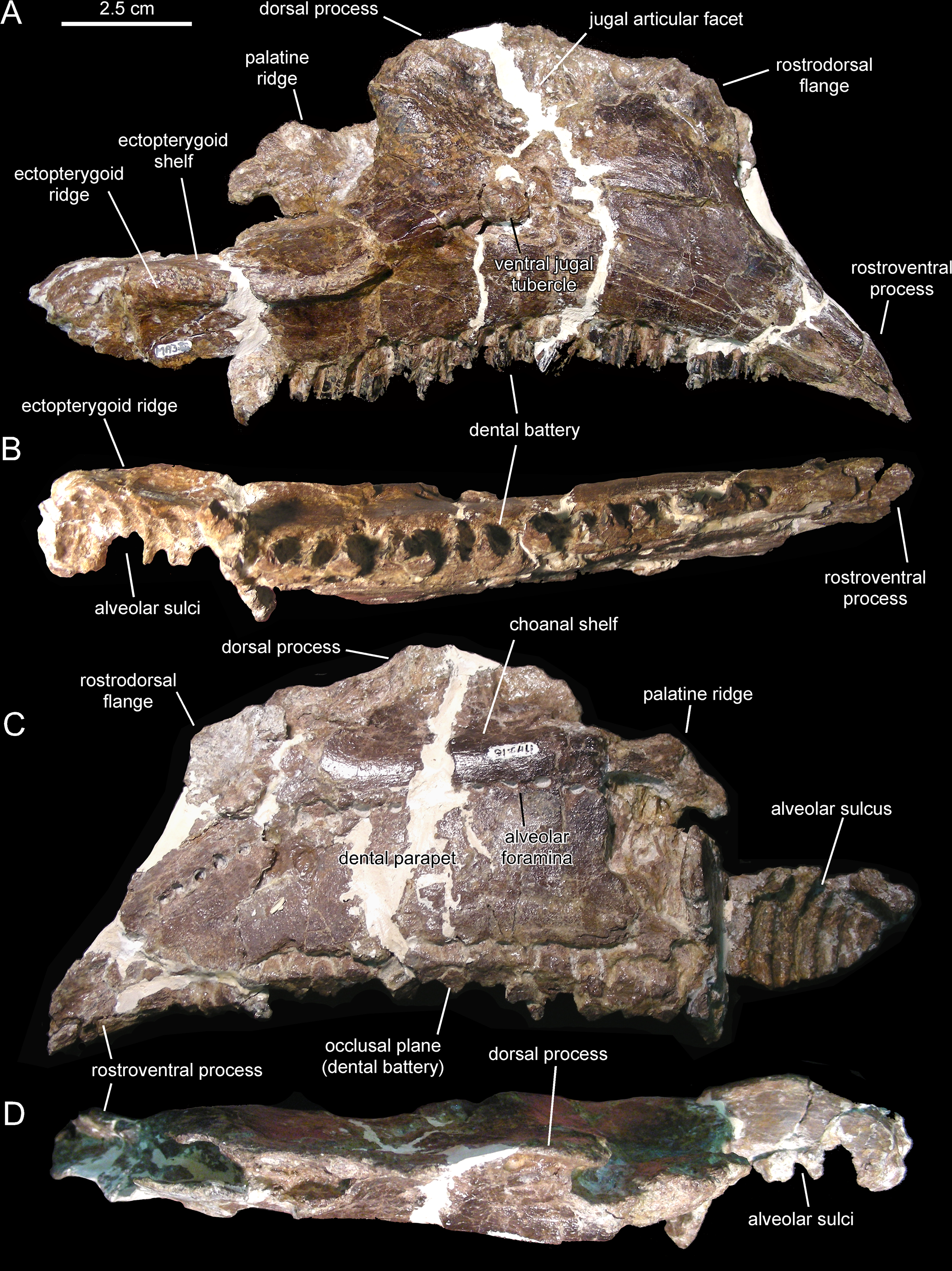
- Holotype maxilla of Canardia garonnensis from the basal part of the Marnes d'Auzas Formation

Scientific classification
- Kingdom: Animalia
- Phylum: Chordata
- Class: Reptilia
- Clade: Dinosauria
- Clade: †Ornithischia
- Clade: †Ornithopoda
- Family: †Hadrosauridae
- Subfamily: †Lambeosaurinae
- Genus: †Canardia; Prieto-Márquez et al., 2013

Type species
- †Canardia garonnensis Prieto-Márquez et al., 2013

= Canardia =

Canardia Temporal range: Late Cretaceous, 67.5–66 Ma

Extinct genus of dinosaurs

Canardia is an extinct genus of lambeosaurine dinosaur known from the Late Cretaceous Marnes d'Auzas Formation (late Maastrichtian stage) of Haute-Garonne department, in Occitanie region, southwestern France. The type species Canardia garonnensis was first described and named by Albert Prieto-Márquez, Fabio M. Dalla Vecchia, Rodrigo Gaete and Àngel Galobart in 2013. It is only known from juvenile specimens.

The name of the genus comes from "canard", the French word for "duck", an allusion to the fact that this animal belongs to the Hadrosauridae which are also known as "duck-billed dinosaurs". The specific epithet garonnensis refers to the Haute-Garonne department where this dinosaur has been found. Although universally recognized as a member of the Lambeosaurinae, its precise position within the subfamily is debated. Some authors consider it as a close relative of the genus Aralosaurus from Central Asia with which it would form the tribe Aralosaurini, while others include it in a more derived clade, the Arenysaurini in which all lambeosaurines from Europe and North Africa are placed. Canardia was one of the last non-avian dinosaurs and lived between 67.5 and 66 million years ago on the former Ibero-Armorican Island, which included much of France and Spain.

== Discovery and naming ==
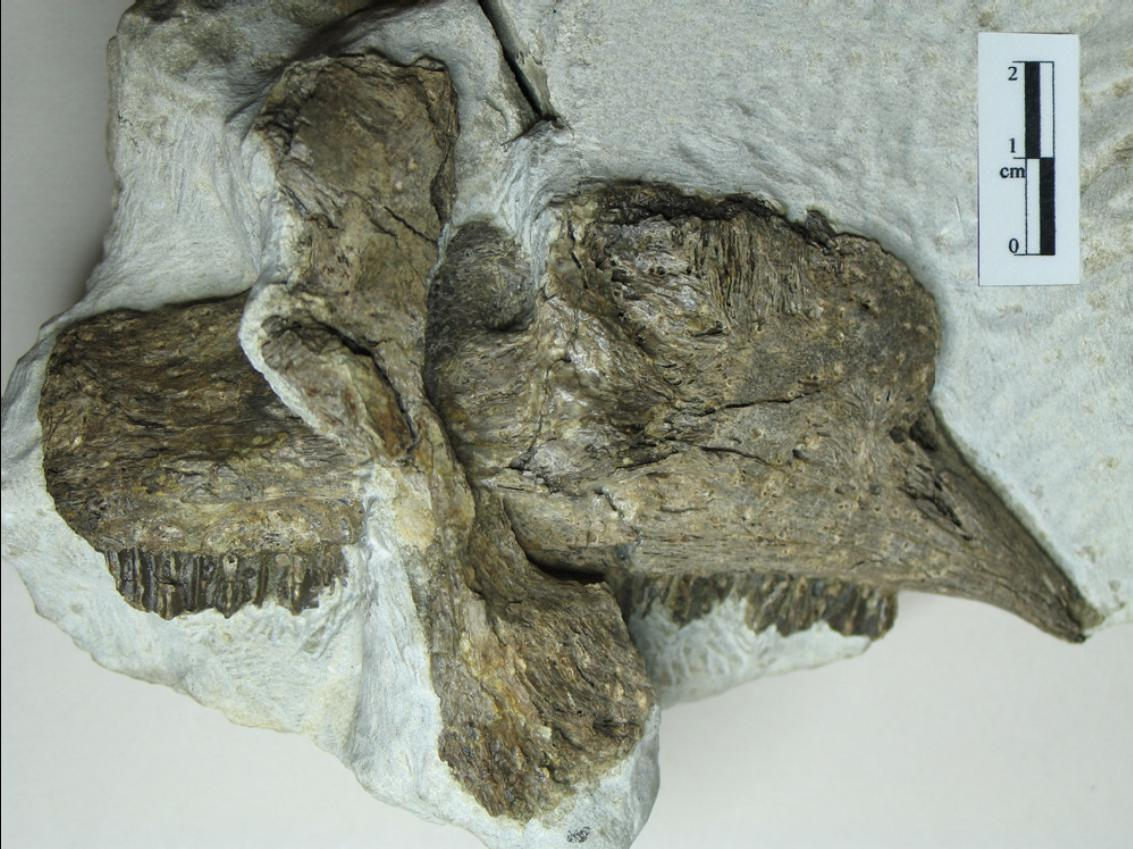
The Larcan specimen (a right maxilla and quadrate) of Canardia found about 1 m under an iridium level marking the Cretaceous-Paleogene boundary.

Canardia is known by various cranial and postcranial remains found in several sites in southwestern France (Haute-Garonne Department). The type locality of Tricouté 3, near the village of Marignac-Laspeyres, was discovered in 1999 by a team of The Musée des Dinosaures d'Espéraza. This site is located in the basal part of the Marnes d'Auzas Formation, which corresponds to a laguno-continental environment. The hadrosaur remains were preserved in a small lenticular marly-sandstone level within a thick sandstone bed. They belong to at least two different individuals as indicated by the presence of two left scapulae among the samples. The cranial elements include a nearly complete right maxilla (the holotype), a partial left maxilla, a right prefrontal, an incomplete right postorbital, a left quadrate, a right pterygoid, a partial left surangular, a right articular, an isolated dentary tooth crown, and a partial dental battery of the lower jaw. The postcranial material is represented by two partial left scapulae, an incomplete left sternal plate, a left humerus, and a partial right pubis. In 2003, these specimens were provisionally attributed to Pararhabdodon sp., a Spanish genus that at the time was the only known lambeosaurin in Europe. It was not until 2013 that Prieto-Márquez and colleagues recognized these bones as those of a new genus. All bones are of relatively small sizes (the holotype maxilla is 16.9 cm, the scapula is 21.8 cm, and the humerus is only 19.4 cm) and belong to immature individuals.

The same authors have also attributed to Canardia an associated maxilla and quadrate found in marine deposits of the Marly Limestone of Gensac Formation in Larcan quarry, about twenty km west of Marignac-Laspeyres. The two bones, first described in 2010 by Bilotte et al., were located approximately 1 m under an iridium level marking the Cretaceous-Paleogene boundary. This level is a lateral equivalent to the uppermost part of the Marne d'Auzas Formation. This shows that the Larcan individual is geologically younger than the Marignac-Laspeyres specimens. This discovery also indicates that Canardia was one of the last non-avian dinosaurs to exist in Europe just before the Cretaceous-Paleogene extinction event. The Larcan specimen belongs to a juvenile individual (the length of the maxilla is 11.5 cm), whose remains were carried by a river to the sea.

== Description ==
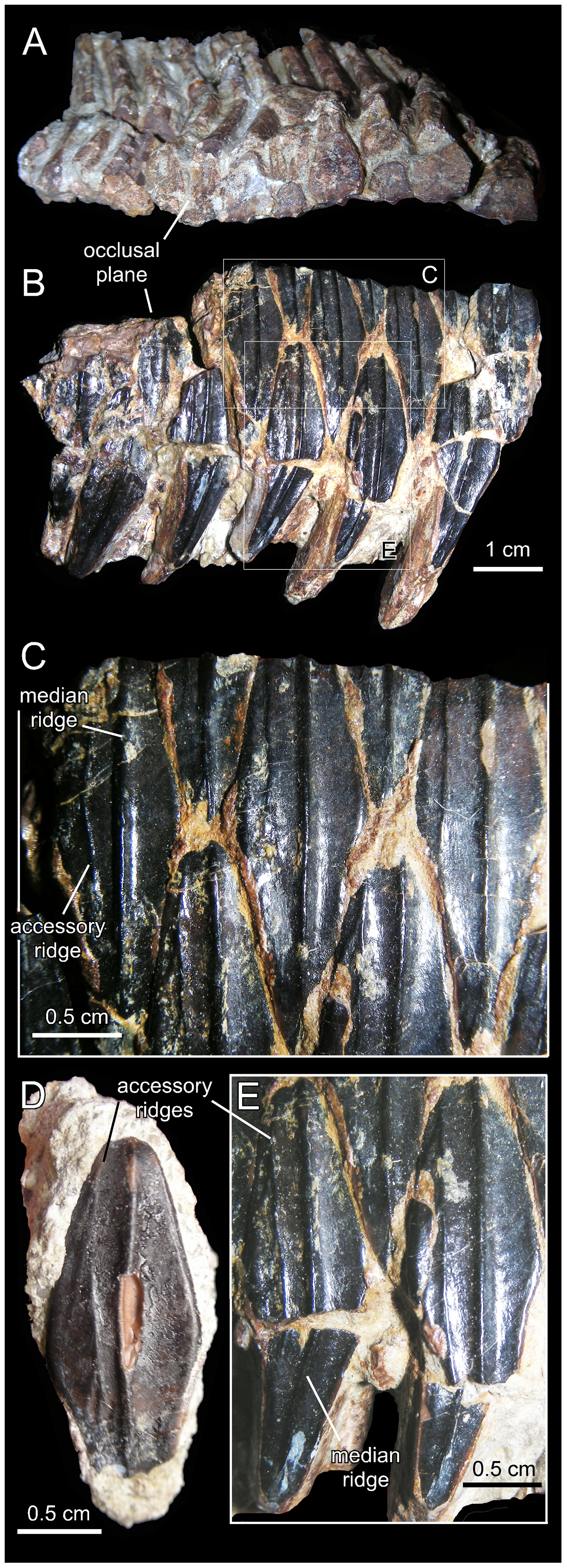
Canardia garonnensis. Part of the dental battery of the lower jaw in occlusal (A) and lingual (B) views. Details of the crowns of the same specimens (C, E) and of an isolated dentary tooth (D).

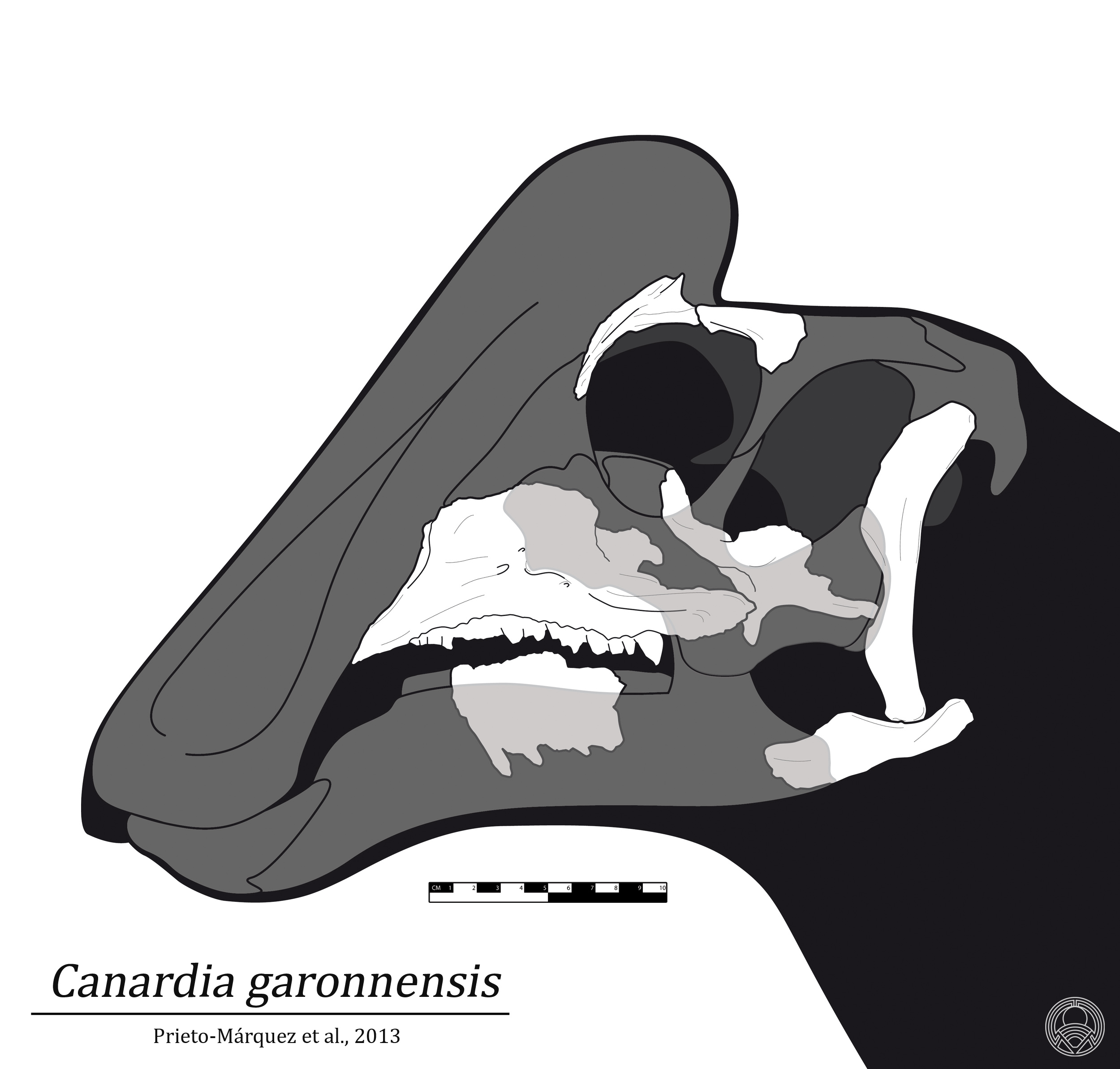
Diagram of skull material

The main feature of Canardia is the maxilla characterized by an enlarged rostrodorsal region that forms a prominent subrectangular flange that rises vertically above the rostroventral process. This character is also known in Aralosaurus tuberiferus from Kazakhstan that lived 20 million years before Canardia. However, the maxilla of Canardia differs from that of Aralosaurus in its subhorizontal ectopterygoid shelf (it is parallel to the posterior segment of the dental row) whereas it is clearly inclined in Aralosaurus. The maxilla of Canardia shows at least 26 teeth positions against 30 in Aralosaurus, but the entire tooth row is not preserved in the French form. The maxillary teeth have a single median carina while the dentary teeth have an accessory ridge in front of the sub-central carina, as is the case in Aralosaurus and in many other hadrosaurs. Canardia differs also from Aralosaurus by the shape of the prefrontal in dorsal view. In Canardia, the rostroventral process of the prefrontal is rostrocaudally narrow, whereas in Aralosaurus, the same bone process is broad and laterally well-exposed. In addition, the prefrontal of Canardia has a dorsomedial flange that is absent in Aralosaurus.

=== Possible crest-shape ===
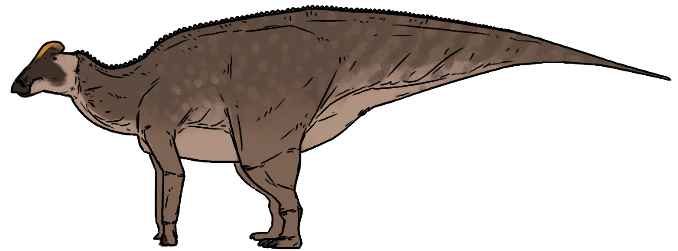
Life restoration with hypothetical crest-shape

It is not known if Canardia had a hollow bony crest on the skull like most lambeosaurines. Although no complete skull is known for the two groups of hadrosaurs to which it has been successively attached, both have very different cranial conformation. Aralosaurus, one of the most primitive lambeosaurine, didn't have a crest on the skull roof because the latter was not modified to accommodate such a structure. Instead, it had a hollow structure in front of the orbits. However, as only a fragment of this structure has been preserved, its size and shape are unfortunately unknown. In contrast, the morphology of the skull roof in Arenysaurus clearly shows that it supported a cranial crest. But as no Arenysaurini crest has yet been discovered, their exact morphologies are still unknown.

== Classification ==
The precise classification of Canardia among hadrosaurs is still uncertain. In 2013, based on the similarities between the maxillae of Canardia and Aralosaurus, Prieto-Marquez and colleagues had included these two genera in a new group of basal lambeosaurines called Aralosaurini. However, a different classification was proposed in 2021 by Longrich and colleagues when describing the genus Ajnabia from Morocco. Unlike previous studies which divided European lambeosaurines into different lineages (Lambeosaurini, Parasaurolophini, Tsintaosaurini and Aralosaurini), the study by Longrich et al. considers all European lambeosaurines to form a monophyletic clade named Arenysaurini, which also includes the newly described North African genus. Canardia is not here identified as being particularly close to Aralosaurus, and occupies a more derive position.

The phylogenetic analyzes carried out by Prieto-Márquez and his colleagues led to the following cladogram:

- Lambeosaurinae
  - Aralosaurini
    - Aralosaurus
    - Canardia
  - - Jaxartosaurus
    - - Tsintaosaurini
        - Tsintaosaurus
        - Pararhabdodon
      - - Parasaurolophini
          - Charonosaurus
          - Parasaurolophus
            - Parasaurolophus cyrtocristatus
            - - Parasaurolophus tubicen
              - Parasaurolophus walkeri
        - Lambeosaurini
          - Lambeosaurus
            - Lambeosaurus lambei
            - Lambeosaurus magnicristatus
          - - Corythosaurus
              - Corythosaurus casuarius
              - Corythosaurus intermedius
            - - "Hypacrosaurus" stebingeri
              - - Hypacrosaurus
                - Olorotitan
                - - Arenysaurus
                  - Blasisaurus
                - - Magnapaulia
                  - - Velafrons
                    - - Amurosaurus
                      - Sahaliyania

Below is the cladogram published by Longrich et al.

- Hadrosauridae
  - Saurolophinae
  - Lambeosaurinae
    - Aralosaurus
    - - Jaxartosaurus
      - - Nipponosaurus
        - - Tsintaosaurus
          - - Arenysaurini
              - - Arenysaurus
                - Pararhabdodon
              - - Koutalisaurus
                - - - Basturs lambeosaurine
                    - Canardia
                  - - Adynomosaurus
                    - - Serrat del Rostiar lambeosaurine
                      - - Blasisaurus
                        - Ajnabia
            - - Parasaurolophini
              - Lambeosaurini

== Palaeoecology ==
=== Paleobiogeography ===
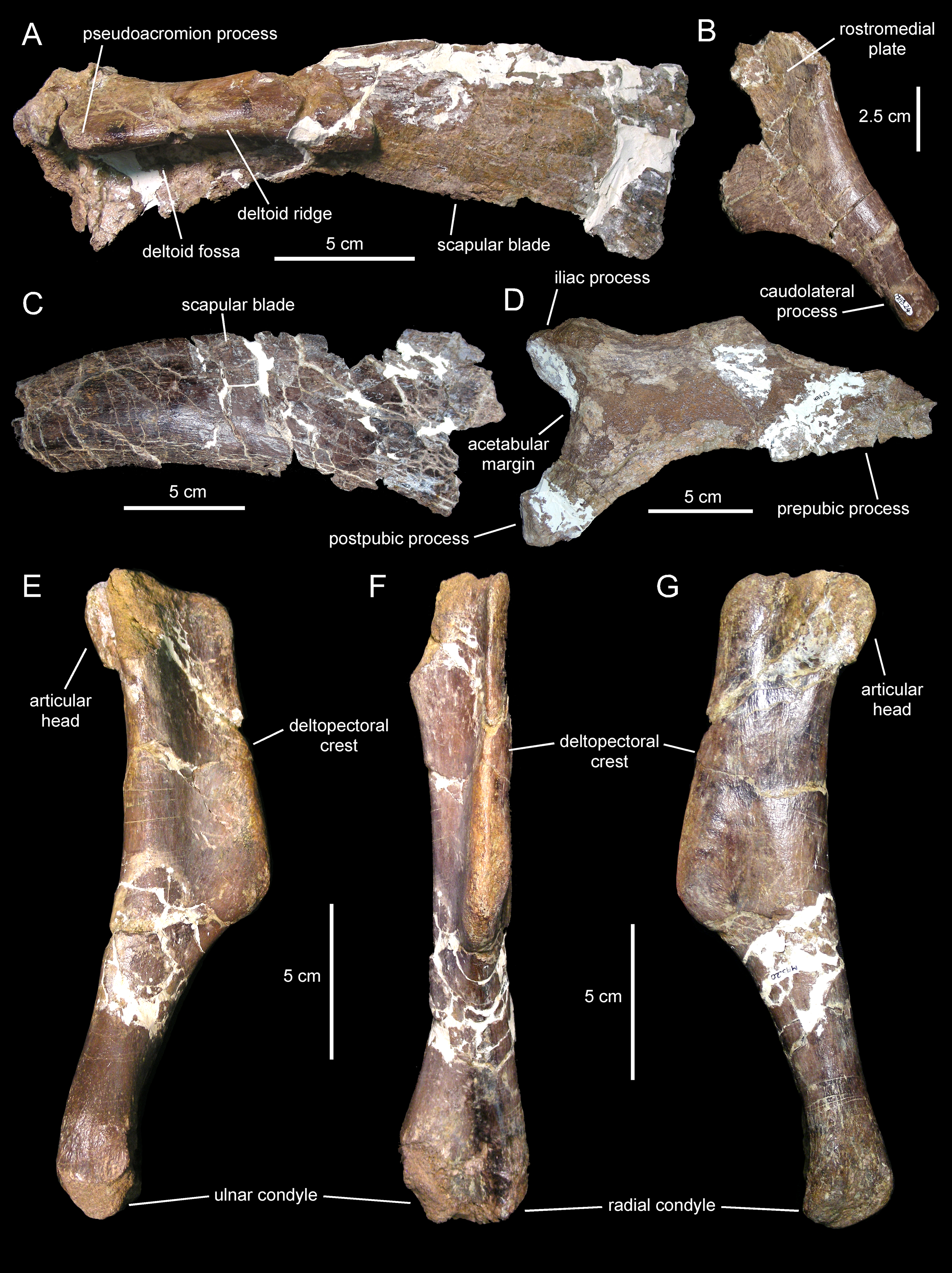
Appendicular bones of Canardia. Left Scapula in lateral view (A). Left sternal plate in ventrolateral view (B). Distal blade of left scapula in lateral view (C). Fragmentary right pubis in lateral view (D). Left humerus in medial (E), rostral (F), and lateral (G) views.

Paleontologists agree on a probable Asian origin of European lambeosaurines. According to Prieto-Marquez and colleagues, Canardia and the Spanish genus Pararhabdodon had as closest relatives the Asian genera Aralosaurus and Tsintaosaurus, respectively. These are respectively 20 and 15 million years older than their presumed European relatives. Thus, Canardia and Pararhabdodon would both belong to rather archaic groups of lambeosaurines for their time and the Ibero-Armorican island would have constituted an ultimate refuge for these ancient groups of lambeosaurines. Longrich and colleagues, who place Canardia and all other European lambeosaurines in the Arenysaurini clade, also suggest an Asian origin for paleogeographic reasons. As no lambeosaurines were known in the rich localities of late Campanian and early Maastrichtian ages of the Ibero-Armorican Island, it was suggested that the ancestors of Canardia had to reach this island rather late, perhaps at the end of the early Maastrichtian or during the late Maastrichtian. The discovery later in Spain of numerous lambeosaurines remains in the highest levels of the lower Maastrichtian argues for the first hypothesis. This migration was probably carried out in several stages, firstly by temporary terrestrial links between the landmass of Western Asia and the eastern islands of the European archipelago, then between the different European islands up to the Ibero-Armorican Island. From this island, the lambeosaurines would then have reached North Africa by oceanic dispersal, the hadrosaurs swimming, drifting, or rafting (in the case of early juvenile hadrosaurs) over great distances, the Ibero-Armorican island and the coasts of Morocco (where Ajnabia lived) being separated at the time by 500 km of open sea.

=== Palaeoenvironment ===
The Marnes d'Auzas Formation is 100 m thick. It corresponds to sediments whose depositional environment evolved from the paralic domain (coastal lagoons, tidal marsh, tidal muddy channel) at the base of the formation, towards a more continental domain (alluvial plain, fluvial channels) in its upper part. From a paleogeographic point of view, the sites of the Marnes d'Auzas Formation were located on the west coast of the Ibero-Armorican Island (which included much of France and Spain), facing the Atlantic Gulf.

Few other vertebrates fossils have been found with the Canardia remains. The type locality of Tricouté 3, in the basal part of the Marnes d'Auzas Formation, has yielded only a crocodilian tooth, whereas the marine Marly limestone of Gensac Formation (the lateral equivalent of the top of the Marnes d'Auzas) has not yet yielded other terrestrial vertebrates remains. However, a more diverse fauna is known from the Cassagnau localities, in the middle part of the Marnes d'Auzas Formation. The Cassagnau's fauna is also located near Marignac-Laspeyres and includes several fish (Lepisosteidae, Phyllodontidae, Sparidae), Amphibians (Albanerpetontidae), several turtles including a complete carapace of Iberoccitanemys convenarum, various crocodylians including teeth of a Musturzabalsuchus-like form and a complete skull attributed to Thoracosaurus neocesariensis, two squamates (an indeterminate lizard and a varanoid form which is probably a freshwater mosasauroid), a probable enantiornithe bird, an indeterminate dromaeosaurid (known only by teeth), an indeterminate theropod of larger size (only known by a tooth characterized by its anterior carina running on the lingual side of the teeth), an indeterminate titanosaurian sauropod represented by teeth and a metacarpal (the shape of the teeth suggests that they belong to an Atsinganosaurus-like form), and an indeterminate lambeosaurine hadrosaur.

The latter is exclusively represented by juvenile individuals and includes an articulated postcranial skeleton, teeth, and two left dentaries, one of them being associated with a predentary. No maxilla is preserved in these specimens, so it is not possible to know if this hadrosaur belongs to Canardia or to another lambeosaurine. The Marnes d'Auzas Formation is also present in the department of Ariège, notably near the village of Mérigon. There, a coarse sandstone bed at the top of the formation has yielded a tooth and a dentary fragment of an indeterminate hadrosaur, as well as a cervical vertebra of a giant Azhdarchid pterosaur of 9 meters wingspan.

== See also ==
- Timeline of hadrosaur research
