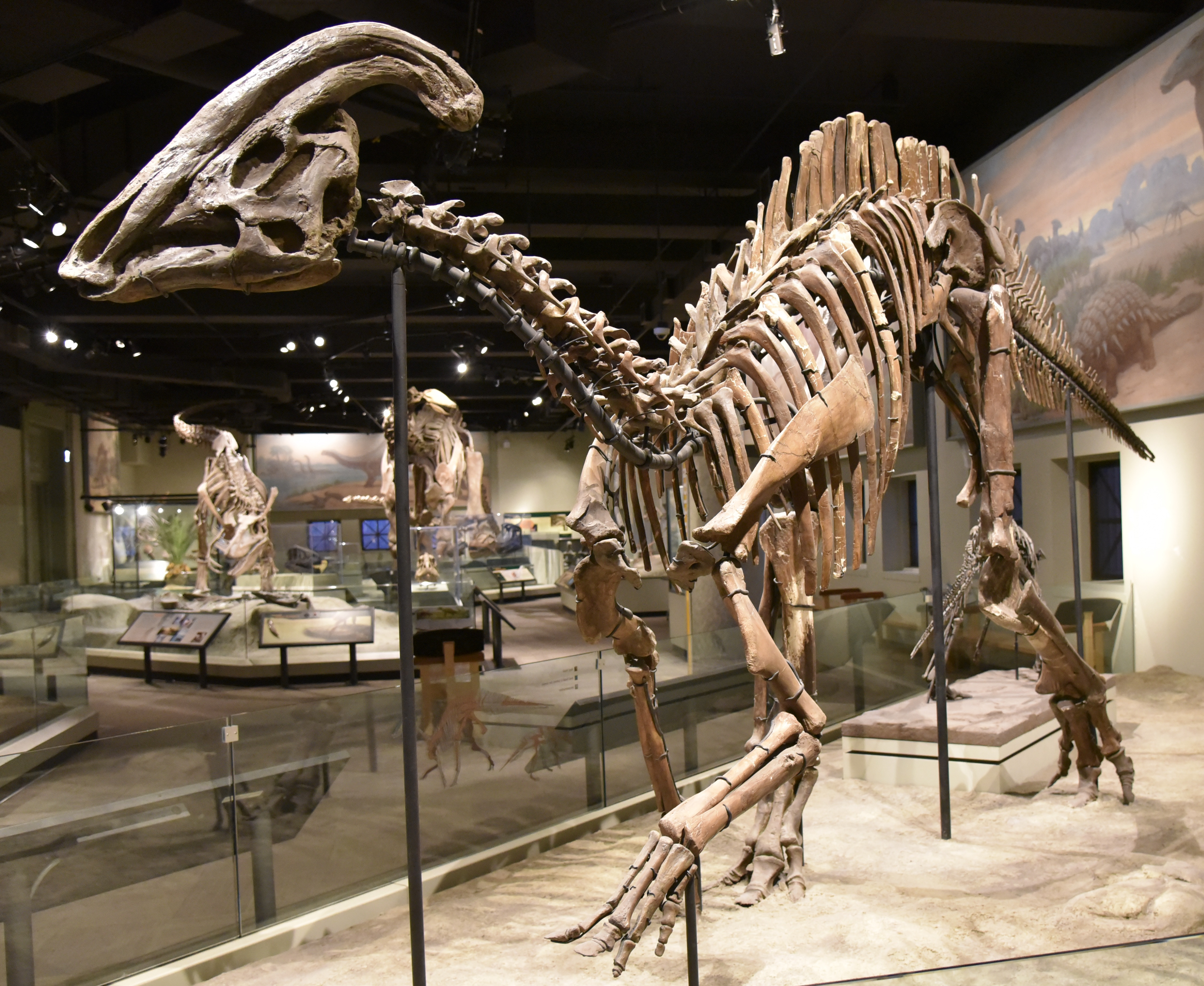
- Skeleton FMNH P-27393 of Parasaurolophus cyrtocristatus, Field Museum of Natural History

Scientific classification
- Kingdom: Animalia
- Phylum: Chordata
- Class: Reptilia
- Clade: Dinosauria
- Clade: †Ornithischia
- Clade: †Ornithopoda
- Family: †Hadrosauridae
- Clade: †Euhadrosauria
- Subfamily: †Lambeosaurinae; Parks, 1923

Subgroups
- †Adynomosaurus; †Ajnabia; †Angulomastacator; †Aralosaurus; †Arenysaurus; †Blasisaurus; †Canardia; †Jaxartosaurus; †Latirhinus; †Minqaria; †Nanningosaurus?; †Nipponosaurus; †Taleta; †Tsintaosaurini Prieto-Márquez et al., 2013; †Pararhabdodon?; †Tsintaosaurus; †Corythosauria Madzia et al., 2021; †Lambeosaurini Sullivan et al., 2011; †Amurosaurus?; †Corythosaurus; †Hypacrosaurus; †Kazaklambia; †Lambeosaurus; †Magnapaulia; †Olorotitan; †Velafrons; †Parasaurolophini Prieto-Márquez et al., 2013; †Adelolophus; †Charonosaurus; †Parasaurolophus; †Plesiolophus; †Tlatolophus

Synonyms
- Cheneosaurinae Lull & Wright, 1942; Stephanosaurinae Lambe, 1920; Trachodontinae? Lydekker, 1888

= Lambeosaurinae =

Lambeosaurinae Temporal range: Late Cretaceous, 86.3–66 Ma

Extinct subfamily of dinosaurs

Lambeosaurinae /ˌlæmbiəˈsɔːraɪniː/ (meaning 'Lambe's lizards') is a group of crested hadrosauroid dinosaurs.

== Description ==
=== Size ===
Uncertainty surrounds the size of lambeosaurs from the European continent. Hadrosaurs found there, alongside other dinosaurs, have traditionally been considered representatives of the phenomenon of insular dwarfism, as the continent was then made up of many smaller islands. Many fossil remains from the continent are smaller than those of hadrosaurs found elsewhere in the world, with only isolated remains indicating individuals of adult size by the standards of their relatives in North America and Asia. It remains possible, however, that at least some cases instead represent misidentification of juvenile remains. The presence of genuine dwarfed taxa has been validated in some cases; adults of the genus Minqaria, for example, are thought to be around 3.5 metres (11 ft) in length. Contrastingly, the genus Pararhabdodon has a projected adult size similar to those of hadrosaurs on other continents, and known remains of Adynomosaurus and hadrosaurs from the Basturs Poble bonebed are of this adult size themselves. Why hadrosaurs of such variable sizes co-exist, despite being subject to the same environmental pressures, remains unclear.

== Classification ==
=== History ===
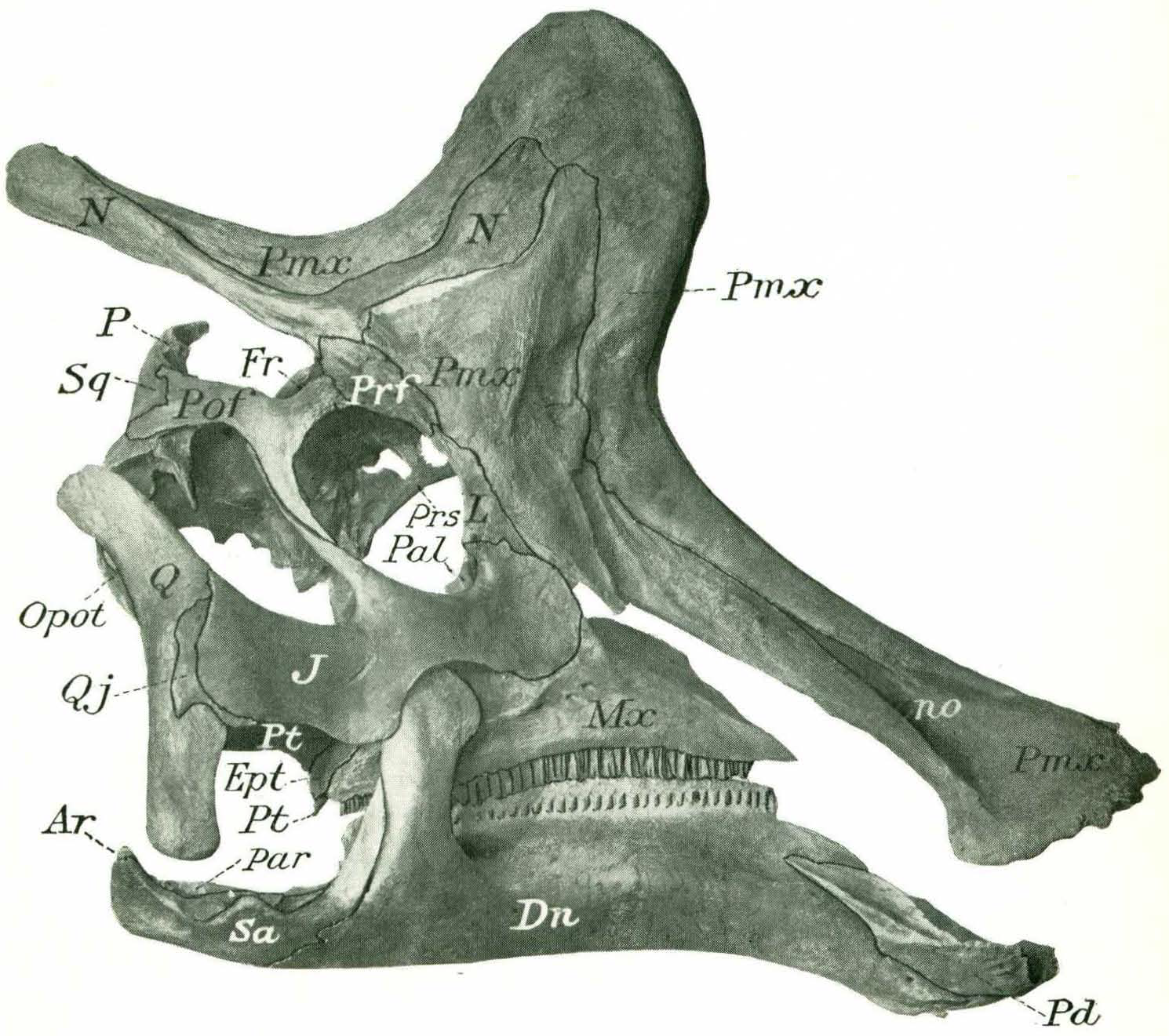
Holotype skull CMN 2869 of Lambeosaurus lambei

The first material of hadrosaurids were found in the 1850s and named by American paleontologist Joseph Leidy: Trachodon mirabilis from Montana and Thespesius occidentalis from South Dakota in 1856, and Hadrosaurus foulkii from New Jersey in 1859. Numerous additional genera and species were described throughout the following decades, with the first discoveries in Alberta in the late 1890s and early 1900s by Canadian paleontologist Lawrence M. Lambe being ascribed to Trachodon under the subgenus Pteropelyx. The first hadrosaur to preserve a crest on the skull was Saurolophus named in 1912 by American paleontologist Barnum Brown for a skeleton from Alberta. It was to Saurolophus that Lambe found the greatest similarities for new specimens described from Alberta in 1914, which preserved a prominent crest on top of the skull. These remains he assigned to Stephanosaurus, a new genus name for Trachodon marginatus he had named earlier for material from the 1900s expeditions. While the crest of Saurolophus projected backwards, that of the material assigned to Stephanosaurus projected upwards above the eye. Brown followed up in 1914 with the description of some nearly complete skeletons from Alberta that he named Corythosaurus casuarius, which showed a tall and rounded crest atop the skull, and with him questioning the generic status of Stephanosaurus. As Stephanosaurus marginatus was named for incomplete material from the skeleton, Brown did not find the referral of the crested skulls to the taxon justifiable, suggesting they could belong to the genus Corythosaurus but as a distinct species. Brown also separated Trachodontidae into two subfamilies for the first time, uniting the taxa with crested skulls into Saurolophinae while other genera were contained within Trachodontinae.

Lambe subsequently revised the classification of Hadrosauridae (the older name for Trachodontidae) in 1920 following the description of the new genera Cheneosaurus, Edmontosaurus, and Prosaurolophus and the discovery of a new skull he referred to Stephanosaurus in the interim, identifying that the crests of Saurolophus and Prosaurolophus were formed of different bones than the other crested genera and as a result separating Corythosaurus, Cheneosaurus, Hypacrosaurus and Stephanosaurus (including the crested skulls) into the new subfamily Stephanosaurinae. In 1923 the crested skulls were again removed from Stephanosaurus, this time by Canadian paleontologist William A. Parks, who established the new taxon Lambeosaurus lambei for them in honor of Lambe who had first described them. As Stephanosaurus could no longer be shown to be a crested hadrosaur, Parks also named the subfamily Lambeosaurinae to replace Stephanosaurinae for the group. This separation was further supported by American paleontologist Charles W. Gilmore the next year, who found that Stephanosaurus could be better referred to the genus Kritosaurus and was a member of Hadrosaurinae rather than Lambeosaurinae. Gilmore could not identify which subfamily Trachodon should belong in due to its very limited material, so he supported the separation of Hadrosauridae into Hadrosaurinae (rather than Trachodontinae), Saurolophinae, and Lambeosaurinae, the latter of which now also included Parasaurolophus.

American paleontologists Richard Swann Lull and Nelda E. Wright published a review article of Hadrosauridae in 1942 where they supported the subfamilies of Gilmore with the addition of Cheneosaurinae, which they named for small-bodied crested genera Cheneosaurus and Procheneosaurus. Cheneosaurins had small rounded crests while lambeosaurines possessed more elaborate crests of different forms between the genera. Both Lambeosaurinae and Cheneosaurinae were elevated to family rank as Lambeosauridae and Cheneosauridae by German paleontologist Friedrich von Huene in 1948 and 1956 respectively. However, American paleontologist Charles Mortram Sternberg in 1953 recognized that the divisions of previous studies were not useful, separating genera based on an arbitrary decision of feature significance, especially the separation of Cheneosaurinae from Lambeosaurinae. As a result, he condensed Hadrosauridae into only two subfamilies: Hadrosaurinae and Lambeosaurinae, with saurolophines being members of Hadrosaurinae, and cheneosaurines being members of Lambeosaurinae. Within Lambeosaurinae he included Lambeosaurus, Corythosaurus, Hypacrosaurus, Parasaurolophus, Cheneosaurus, Tetragonosaurus, and Trachodon; a classification he reiterated in 1954.

Work by American paleontologist Peter Dodson in 1975 revised the taxonomy of Lambeosaurinae by recognizing that Cheneosaurus and Procheneosaurus were not distinct genera but rather juveniles of other taxa that were not old enough to have fully-developed crests. The species of Procheneosaurus were identified as synonyms of either Lambeosaurus or Corythosaurus, while Cheneosaurus was identified as a juvenile of Hypacrosaurus. Following the recognition of cheneosaurs as juveniles of Lambeosaurus, Corythosaurus, and Hypacrosaurus, American palaeontologist Michael K. Brett-Surman published a phylogeny of all accepted genera of Hadrosauridae in 1979, and expanded Lambeosaurinae to also include Tsintaosaurus, with Jaxartosaurus and Bactrosaurus as early members, and Lambeosaurus, Corythosaurus and Hypacrosaurus as one another's closest relatives. A 1990 review of hadrosaurs by American paleontologists David B. Weishampel and John R. Horner was unable to conclude if Tsintaosaurus was a lambeosaurine or hadrosaurine, but added the Asian genera Barsboldia and Nipponosaurus to Lambeosaurinae. The content of Lambeosaurinae expanded over the next decades before the second review by Horner in 2004. During this period, the Asian genera Amurosaurus, Charonosaurus, and Olorotitan were named and added to Lambeosaurinae, and the status of Tsintaosaurus as a lambeosaurine was solidified.

=== Subgroups ===
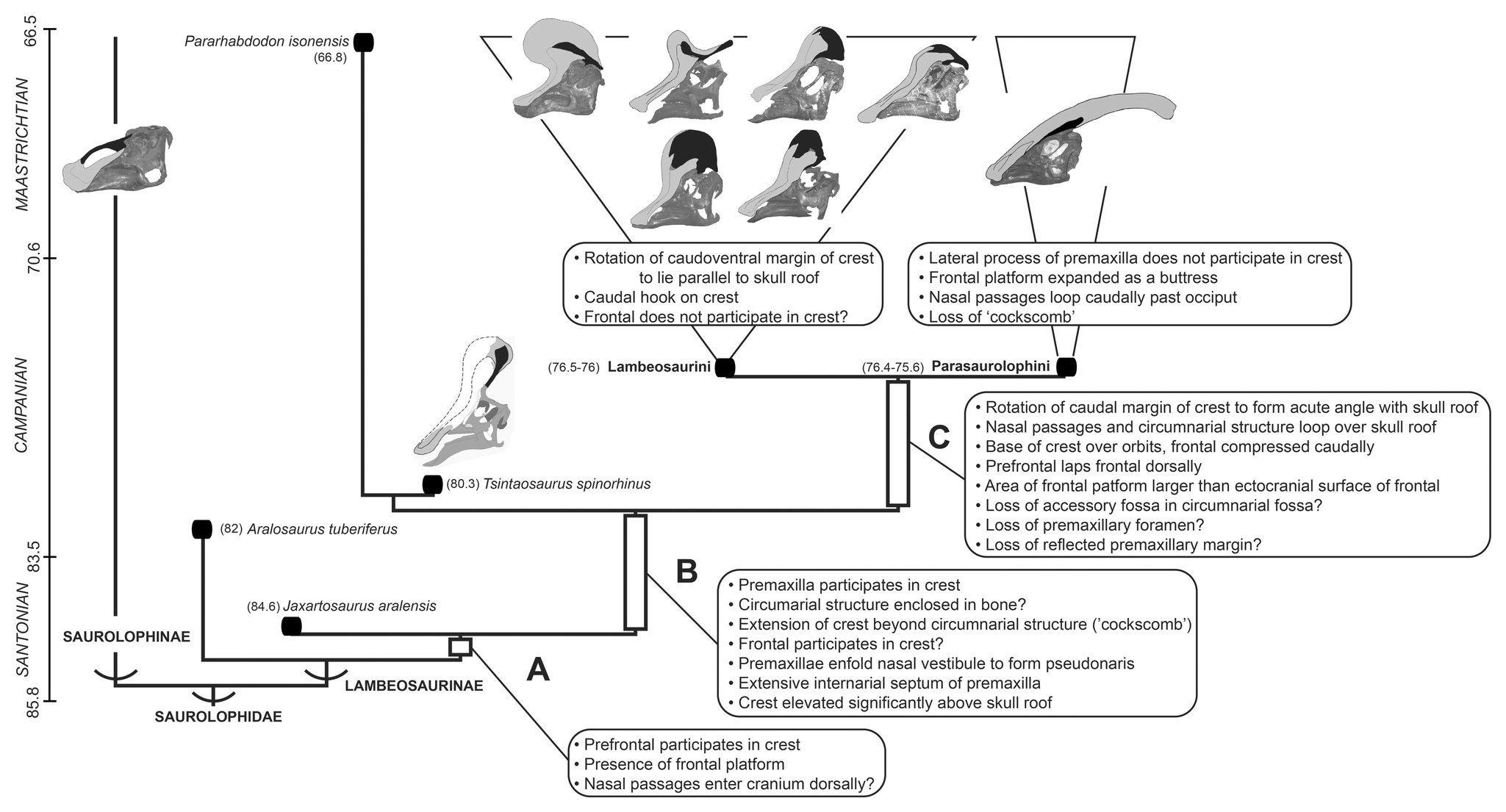
Diagram showing crest anatomy in lambeosaurines

While previous studies had separated lambeosaurines into Cheneosaurinae and Lambeosaurinae, Sternberg had united them into Lambeosaurinae without internal subdivisions in 1953. The internal phylogeny of Lambeosaurinae was first presented in 1961 by American paleontologist John Ostrom, based on the genera present in North America. A Procheneosaurus-Cheneosaurus line was suggested to represent the earliest divergence of lambeosaurines, followed by the successive line of Parasaurolophus species. Remaining lambeosaurines were a central group that could be separated into lines of Lambeosaurus, and Corythosaurus-Hypacrosaurus. This subdivision of Lambeosaurinae was succeeded by the works of American paleontologist Michael K. Brett-Surman in 1979 and 1989, who recognized the synonymy of procheneosaurs with other lambeosaurines and thus reduced the number of lambeosaurine lineages. Including global lambeosaurine genera, two lineages were recognized, a group of "corythosaurs" including Jaxartosaurus, Lambeosaurus, Corythosaurus and Hypacrosaurus, and a group of "parasaurolophs" including Bactrosaurus, Tsintaosaurus and Parasaurolophus. In his unpublished 1989 thesis these lineages were given tribe ranks as Corythosaurini and Parasaurolophini, sharing the same content as his 1975 paper but with Jaxartosaurus, Barsboldia, and Nipponosaurus recognized as lambeosaurines of uncertain classification.

A corythosaur-clade and parasauroloph-clade was recognized in the 2004 study of Belgian paleontologist Pascal Godefroit and colleagues who found Tsintaosaurus, Jaxartosaurus and Amurosaurus to be early lambeosaurines, Charonosaurus and Parasaurolophus to be "parasaurolophs", and Lambeosaurus, Corythosaurus, Hypacrosaurus and Olorotitan to be "corythosaurs". Both Corythosaurini and Parasaurolophini were formally published for the first time in the 2007 study of Canadian paleontologists David C. Evans and Robert Reisz, who found similar results to Godefroit with the addition of Aralosaurus as an early lambeosaurine, and Nipponosaurus as a corythosaurin. Parasaurolophini was defined as taxa more closely related to Parasaurolophus walkeri than Corythosaurus casuarius, and Corythosaurini was defined as the inverse. Though both subgroups were used by following studies, in 2011 American paleontologist Robert M. Sullivan and colleagues noted that according to the rules of the International Commission on Zoological Nomenclature any group within Lambeosaurinae that contains Lambeosaurus must also be based on that genus; they proposed that the name Lambeosaurini should replace Corythosaurini.

The 2009 reassessment of the genus Koutalisaurus by paleontologist Albert Prieto-Márquez and Jonathan Wagner found that Pararhabdodon (including Koutalisaurus) and Tsintaosaurus formed a clade of early lambeosaurines based on multiple features of the skull as a "tsintaosaur" clade. Support for this group was corroborated in a 2013 study by Prieto-Márquez and colleagues, with Tsintaosaurini being named and defined as the most exclusive clade uniting Tsintaosaurus spinorhinus and Pararhabdodon isonensis. In the same study, the new genus of lambeosaurine Canardia was described, and found to share a unique form of the maxilla with Aralosaurus. For this clade Prieto-Márquez and colleagues named Aralosaurini, defining it as the most exclusive clade uniting Aralosaurus tuberiferus and Canardia garonnensis. Lambeosaurini was also defined for the first time as lambeosaurines closer to Lambeosaurus lambei than Parasaurolophus walkeri, Tsintaosaurus spinorhinus, or Aralosaurus tuberiferus; Parasaurolophini was also redefined with the same specifiers. Within Lambeosaurini Prieto-Márquez and colleagues found Lambeosaurus and Corythosaurus as early-diverging genera, Hypacrosaurus and Olorotitan in a polytomy with a European clade of Arenysaurus and Blasisaurus and a derived clade containing North American Velafrons and Magnapaulia but also east Asian Amurosaurus and Sahaliyania.

Previously, the European taxa Arenysaurus and Blasisaurus had been found together either outside Lambeosaurini or as members of Parasaurolophini, but according to the results of Prieto-Márquez and colleagues in 2013 there would have been three independent dispersals of lambeosaurines into Europe, as aralosaurins, tsintaosaurins, and lambeosaurins. This interpretation of relationships was contested by American paleontologist Nick Longrich and colleagues in 2021, who described the new African genus Ajnabia and included geographic characters in their analysis. Resultingly, all European lambeosaurines were united, along with Ajnabia, as a clade of early lambeosaurines outside Parasaurolophini and Lambeosaurini that was given the name Arenysaurini. Defined as all taxa closer to Arenysaurus ardevoli than Tsintaosaurus spinorhinus, Parasaurolophus walkeri or Lambeosaurus lambei, neither Tsintaosaurini or Aralosaurini were recovered as their European members moved into Arenysaurini. Early-branching lambeosaurines included the Asian genera Aralosaurus, Jaxartosaurus, Tsintaosaurus and Nipponosaurus, Arenysaurini included Arenysaurus, Pararhabdodon, Koutalisaurus, Canardia, Adynomosaurus, Blasisaurus and Ajnabia, Parasaurolophini included Angulomastacator, Adelolophus, Parasaurolophus and Charonosaurus, and Lambeosaurini included Olorotitan, Magnapaulia, Lambeosaurus, Sahaliyania, Amurosaurus, Hypacrosaurus, Velafrons and Corythosaurus.

In 2021 Polish paleontologist Daniel Madzia and colleagues formally established Lambeosaurinae and most of its subgroups under the rules of the PhyloCode. Lambeosaurinae was formally defined as all taxa closer to Lambeosaurus lambei than Hadrosaurus foulkii and Saurolophus osborni, similar to previous definitions but without including the redundant Edmontosaurus regalis as an external specifier. Lambeosaurini and Parasaurolophini were both formally defined using the definitions provided by Prieto-Márquez and colleagues in 2013. Tsintaosaurini was given a new definition as the largest clade containing Tsintaosaurus spinorhinus and Pararhabdodon isonensis but not Aralosaurus tuberiferus, Lambeosaurus lambei or Parasaurolophus walkeri, and Aralosaurini was redefined similarly as the largest clade containing Aralosaurus tuberiferus and Canardia garonnensis but not Tsintaosaurus spinorhinus, Lambeosaurus lambei or Parasaurolophus walkeri. While Arenysaurini was not established as a formal name due to the inconsistent relationships of Arenysaurus relative to other lambeosaurines, Madzia and colleagues did introduce the new clade name Corythosauria to unite Parasaurolophini and Lambeosaurini as the smallest clade containing Corythosaurus casuarius, Lambeosaurus lambei and Parasaurolophus walkeri.

=== Phylogeny ===
The following cladogram was recovered in a 2022 phylogenetic analysis by Xing Hai, and colleagues.

- - Xuwulong
  - - Bactrosaurus
    - - Telmatosaurus
      - - - Gryposaurus
          - Edmontosaurus
        - Lambeosaurinae
          - Aralosaurini
            - Canardia
            - Aralosaurus
          - - Tsintaosaurini
              - Pararhabdodon
              - Tsintaosaurus
            - - Jaxartosaurus
              - - Arenysaurini
                  - Blasisaurus
                  - Arenysaurus
                - Corythosauria
                  - Parasaurolophini
                    - Parasaurolophus cyrtocristatus
                    - - "Charonosaurus" jiayinensis
                      - - Parasaurolophus tubicen
                        - Parasaurolophus walkeri
                  - Lambeosaurini
                    - Olorotitan
                    - - Velafrons
                      - - - Amurosaurus
                          - - Lambeosaurus clavinitialis
                            - - Lambeosaurus magnicristatus
                              - Lambeosaurus lambei
                        - - - Corythosaurus intermedius
                            - Corythosaurus casuarius
                          - - Hypacrosaurus altispinus
                            - - "Magnapaulia" laticaudus
                              - Hypacrosaurus stebingeri

== Distribution ==
Lambeosaurines originated on the continent of Laurasia during the Late Cretaceous, being initially found throughout modern Europe and Asia. Around the Campanian stage, lambeosaurines of the tribe Corythosauria colonized the landmass of Laramidia (modern western North America) via Beringia and spread as far south as Mexico, radiating into a diverse array of a body plans, including famous taxa such as Parasaurolophus and Lambeosaurus. They appear to have also colonized the eastern landmass of Appalachia at some point, based on indeterminate lambeosaurine remains from the late Campanian/Maastrichtian-aged Kanguk Formation of Nunavut.

For unknown reasons, lambeosaurines largely disappeared from North America around the Campanian/Maastrichtian boundary (the last remaining confirmed American member being Hypacrosaurus), but continued their dominance in Laurasia up to the end of the Cretaceous, with some members such as Ajnabia and Minqaria even colonizing northern Africa from Europe. However, fragmentary remains, including a partial humerus, resembling those of lambeosaurines have been reported from the late Maastrichtian-aged New Egypt Formation of New Jersey, USA. If these are lambeosaurine remains, these specimens are unique both for representing one of the very few records of lambeosaurines from the landmass of Appalachia (suggesting that lambeosaurines had managed to migrate eastwards to Appalachia during the Maastrichtian, following the partial closure of the Western Interior Seaway), and potentially representing one of the latest records of the group from North America.

== See also ==
- Timeline of hadrosaur research
