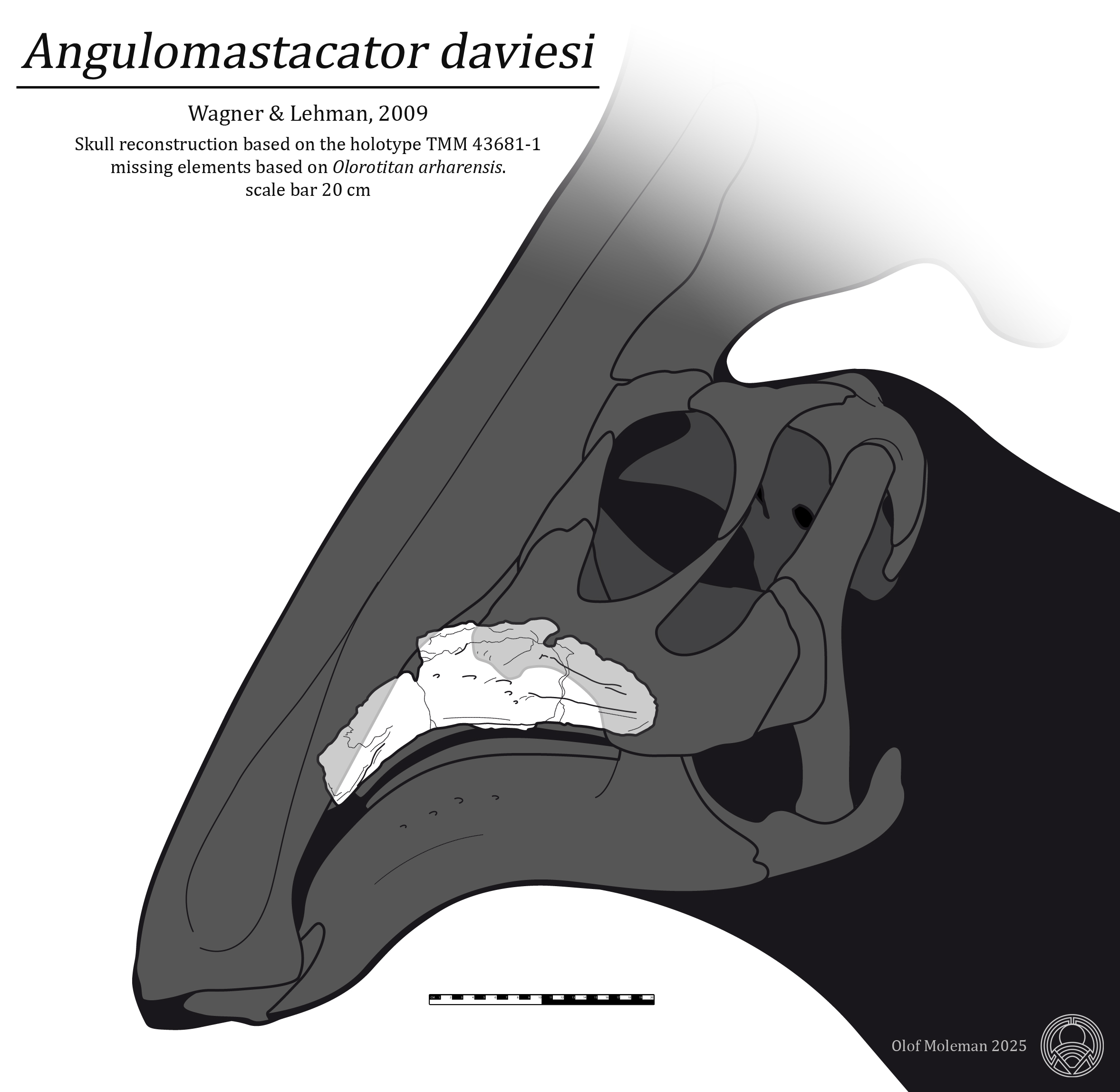
- Reconstructed skull

Scientific classification
- Kingdom: Animalia
- Phylum: Chordata
- Class: Reptilia
- Clade: Dinosauria
- Clade: †Ornithischia
- Clade: †Ornithopoda
- Family: †Hadrosauridae
- Subfamily: †Lambeosaurinae
- Genus: †Angulomastacator; Wagner & Lehman, 2009
- Species: †A. daviesi

Binomial name
- †Angulomastacator daviesi Wagner & Lehman, 2009

= Angulomastacator =

Angulomastacator Temporal range: Late Cretaceous, 76.6 Ma

Extinct genus of dinosaur

Angulomastacator (meaning "bend chewer", in reference to both the shape of its upper jaw and to the Big Bend area of the Rio Grande, where the type specimen was found) is a genus of duck-billed dinosaur from the Campanian-aged (Late Cretaceous) Aguja Formation of Big Bend National Park, Texas.

It is known from a single specimen, TxVP 43681–1, a partial left maxilla (the main tooth-bearing bone of the upper jaw). This bone is curved down approximately 45° at its anterior end, with the tooth row bent to fit, unlike any other hadrosaur. The unusual characteristics of the maxilla, which have not been reported from elsewhere, supports the hypothesis that the dinosaurs of the Aguja Formation were endemic forms. It was discovered in the upper shale member of the Aguja Formation, among plant, bone, and clam fragments in a bed interpreted as the deposits of a small tributary channel. This bed is just below rocks of the overlying Javelina Formation.

Angulomastacator is classified as a lambeosaurine, the group of hadrosaurs with hollow cranial crests. It was described in 2009 by Wagner and Lehman in 2009. The type species is A. daviesi, named for Kyle L. Davies, who in 1983 was the first to postulate the presence of a lambeosaurine in the Aguja Formation. As a hadrosaurid, Angulomastacator would have been a bipedal/quadrupedal herbivore, eating plants with sets of ever-replacing teeth stacked on each other.

== History of naming ==
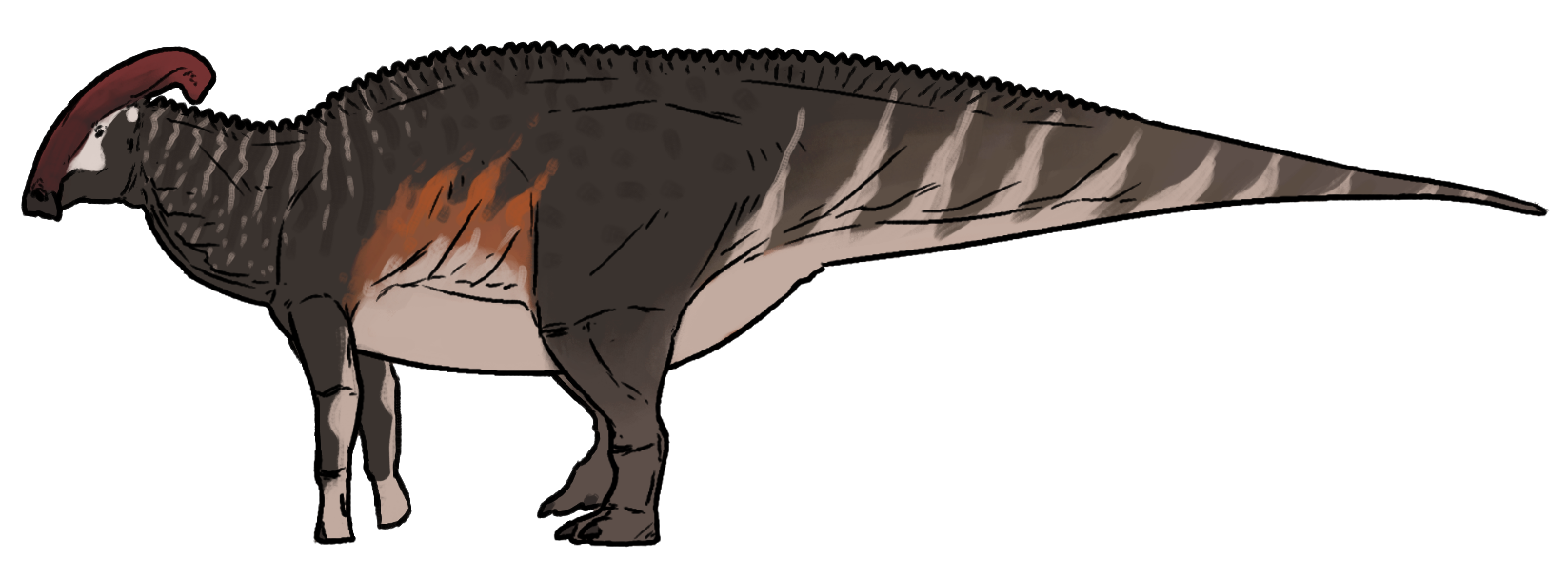
Life restoration

The first reports of Lambeosaurinae from the Aguja Formation of Texas were suggested in 1983 in the thesis of American paleontologist Kyle Davies, based upon the proportions of postcranial bones. While limb proportions have since been shown to not be distinctive of lambeosaurines, a later specimen was discovered in the field by a group from Texas Memorial Museum led by American paleontologist Thomas Lehman, at the "Dawson Creek" locality TxVP 43681. J. Browning discovered a partial maxilla and some vertebrae in the dark grey mudstone, with weathering to suggest that they had been transported by water from a disarticulated skeleton during a flooding event. This locality is from the upper shale of the Aguja Formation, just below the younger Javelina Formation, of Big Bend, Texas, and is comparable in age to a nearby pyroclastic flow dated to 76.9 ± 1.2 million years ago, suggesting a reasonable middle Campanian age of 76.6 mya.

The maxilla, TxVP 43681-1, shows the first clear anatomy of a hadrosaurid from Big Bend, and displayed a diagnostic downturned snout leading Lehman and Jonathan Wagner to describe it as the new taxon Angulomastacator daviesi in 2009. The genus name is a combination of the Latin word angulus ("angle" or "corner"), Ancient Greek word μάσταξ (mastax, "jaw" or "mouth") and the Latin suffix -tor describing agency, with the preferred translation of "bend chewer" in reference to both the location and the shape of the jaw. The specific name is in honor of Davies for his work on Big Bend hadrosaurs and his predictions of a lambeosaurine. Uniqueness of Angulomastacator lends to the idea that the fauna of the Aguja Formation was endemic and provincialized, being different from other contemporaneous faunae of similar age in Alberta and Montana.
