= Larcan =

- Commune
- Location of Larcan
- Location within France Location within Occitanie
- Coordinates: 43°10′36″N 0°43′17″E
- Country: France
- Region: Occitania
- Department: Haute-Garonne
- Arrondissement: Saint-Gaudens
- Canton: Saint-Gaudens

Government
  - Mayor (2020–2026): Henri Fourment
- Area^{1}: 6.96 km^{2} (2.69 sq mi)
- Elevation: 435 m (1,427 ft)
- Highest elevation: 450 m (1,480 ft)
- Lowest elevation: 349 m (1,145 ft)
- Population (2023): 178
  - Density: 25.6/km^{2} (66.2/sq mi)
- Time zone: UTC+01:00 (CET)
  - Summer (DST): UTC+02:00 (CEST)
- INSEE/Postal code: 31274 /31800
- ^{1} French Land Register data, which excludes lakes, ponds, glaciers > 1 km^{2} (0.386 sq mi or 247 acres) and river estuaries.

Larcan (French pronunciation: [laʁkɑ̃]) is a commune in the Haute-Garonne department in southwestern France.

== Population ==
Historical population
Year	Pop.	±% p.a.
1968	164	—
1975	169	+0.43%
1982	168	−0.08%
1990	147	−1.66%
1999	156	+0.66%
2007	173	+1.30%
2012	186	+1.46%
2017	177	−0.99%
2023	178	+0.09%
Source: INSEE

== See also ==
- Communes of the Haute-Garonne department
