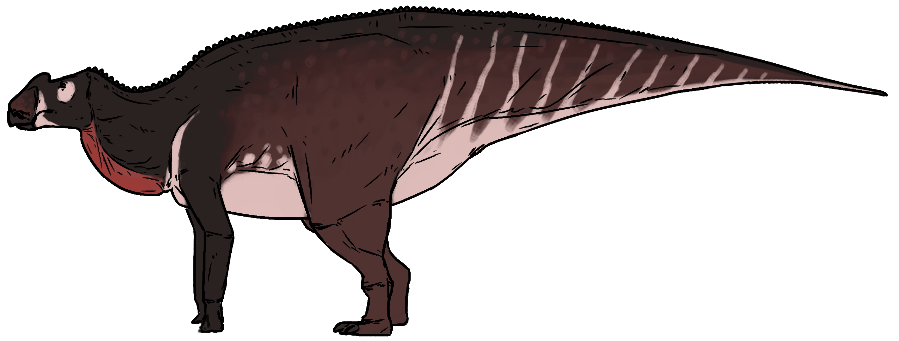
- Life restoration of Aralosaurus

Scientific classification
- Kingdom: Animalia
- Phylum: Chordata
- Class: Reptilia
- Clade: Dinosauria
- Clade: †Ornithischia
- Clade: †Ornithopoda
- Family: †Hadrosauridae
- Subfamily: †Lambeosaurinae
- Genus: †Aralosaurus; Rozhdestvensky, 1968

Type species
- †Aralosaurus tuberiferus Rozhdestvensky, 1968

= Aralosaurus =

Aralosaurus Temporal range: Late Cretaceous, 83.6 Ma

Extinct genus of dinosaurs

Aralosaurus is a genus of lambeosaurine hadrosaurid dinosaur that lived during the Late Cretaceous in what is now Kazakhstan. It is known only by a posterior half of a skull (devoid of its mandible) and some post-cranial bones found in the Bostobe Formation in rocks dated from the Upper Santonian - lower Campanian boundary, at about 83.6 Ma (millions of years ago). Only one species is known, Aralosaurus tuberiferus, described by Anatoly Konstantinovich Rozhdestvensky in 1968. The genus name means "Aral Sea lizard", because it was found to the northeast of the Aral Sea. The specific epithet tuberiferus means "bearing a tuber" because the posterior part of the nasal bone rises sharply in front of the orbits like an outgrowth.

Aralosaurus was originally reconstituted with a nasal arch similar to that of North American Kritosaurus (a comparison based on a specimen now placed in the genus Gryposaurus). For many years, Aralosaurus was thus placed in the clade Hadrosaurinae. This classification was invalidated in 2004, following the re-examination of the skull of the animal which allowed to identify in Aralosaurus many typical characters of Lambeosaurinae. In particular, this study revealed that the genus had a hollow bony structure located far in front of the orbits, which communicated with the respiratory tract. However, this structure is broken at its base, so its shape and size remain undetermined. More recently, Aralosaurus has been identified as the most primitive lambeosaurine and placed with its close relative Canardia from the upper Maastrichtian of France in the new clade Aralosaurini.

== Discovery ==
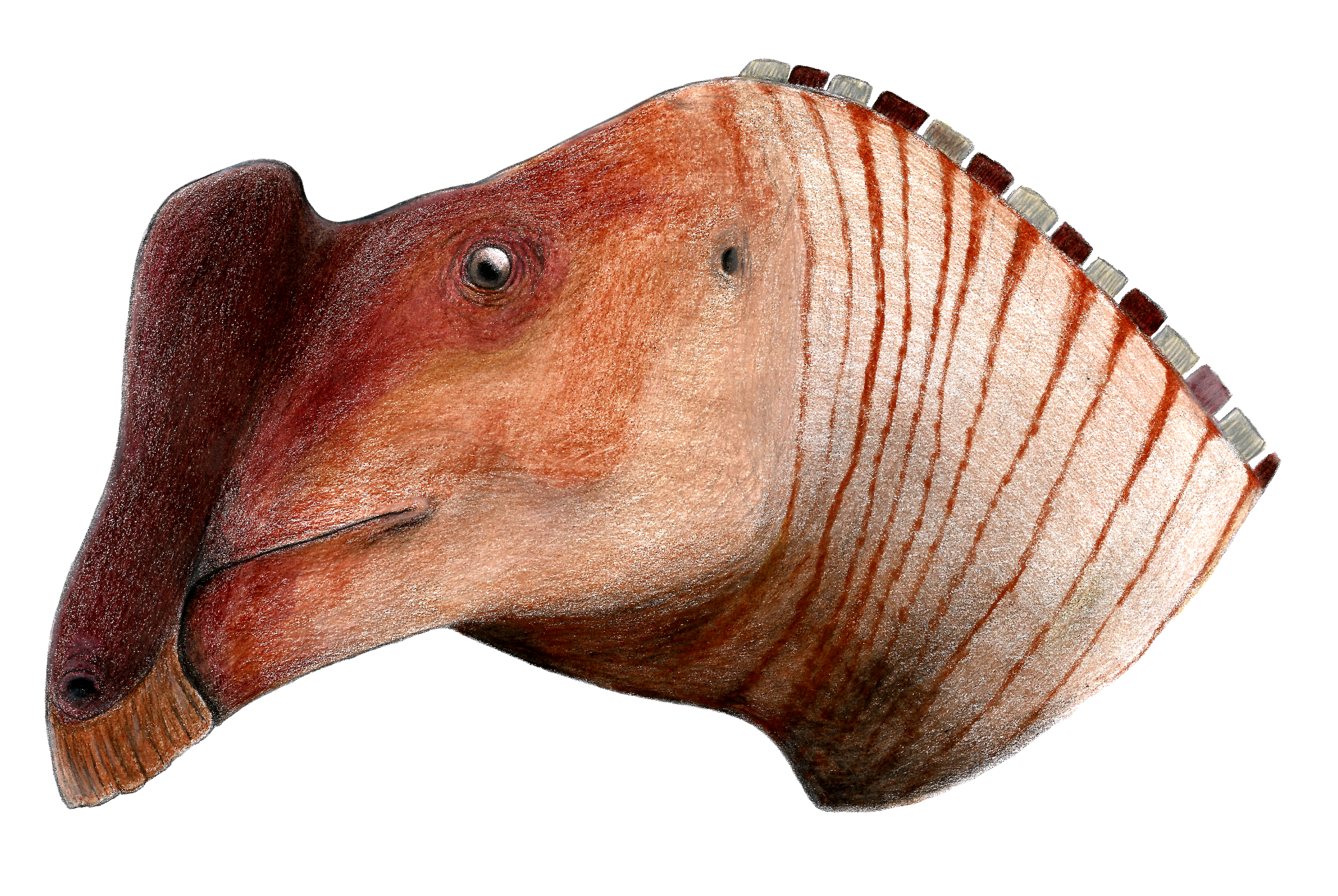
Hypothetical head of Aralosaurus

The partial skull of Aralosaurus was discovered in 1957 near the Shakh-Shakh locality during a Soviet expedition in central Kazakhstan (which at the time was part of the USSR). In addition to the skull (which lacks most of the snout and the entire mandible), the material also included isolated teeth and postcranial elements most often fragmentary (ulna, radius, femur, tibia, fibula, astragalus, metatarsals). The only complete elements were a humerus and a metatarsal. It is only in 1968 that Rozhdestvensky described and named the animal. He estimated the size of the skull at about 65 cm and the size of the animal at about 6.5 m long. As the cranial sutures are far from fusioned, this specimen was probably immature. At the time, Rozhdestvensky argued that the skull of Aralosaurus presented the greatest resemblance with the skull of Kritosaurus with the presence of a nasal arch in front of the orbits (the comparisons were based with specimens attributed today to Gryposaurus, not to Kritosaurus). So, the animal was classified among the Hadrosaurinae, which are hadrosaurs devoid of cranial crest or with a solid bony crest.

In 2004, the skull of Aralosaurus was re-examined by Godefroit and colleagues, and according to them, the bone fragments identified by Rozhdestvensky as the middle part of the nasal arch and the posterior portion of the premaxilla seem to have been lost. These fragments were originally found isolated while the rest of the skull was articulated (including a posterior fragment of the nasal). So that it is no longer possible today to confirm the presence of a nasal arch in Aralosaurus. On the other hand, this study shows that Aralosaurus was not a gryposaur-like hadrosaurine, because the purported nasal boss was in fact a fragment of a hollow structure. Indeed, Godefroit and colleagues did not find any hadrosaurine diagnostic characters in Aralosaurus. On the contrary, the skull of Aralosaurus presents several features (in the maxilla, parietal, squamosal and especially the nasal) which indicates its inclusion among the Lambeosaurinae. Notably, the posterior fragment of the nasal, which is clearly articulated to the rest of the skull, rises just in front of the orbits and forming or participating to a hollow crest-like structure. As this structure is broken at its base, it is not possible to deduce its size and shape. However, in rostral view, the nasal is clearly hollow, it is deeply excavated rostrally by a broad groove that communicates directly with the ventral side of the posterior part of the bone. It is therefore clear that in Aralosaurus the nasal crest surrounded part of the respiratory system. The extension of the nasal cavity inside a hollow crest is typically a lambeosaurine feature, thus confirming the inclusion of Aralosaurus among them. Aralosaurus also exhibits several cranial characters which indicate that it was a basal member of the group. Although having a hollow nasal structure, the latter was located in front of the orbits, a primitive position in lambeosaurines. In the most advanced representatives of the group, the nasal migrates to a caudodorsal position because of the important development of the premaxillae in these forms. In addition, in more derived lambeosaurines, the skull roof is modified to form a fixation zone for the hollow crest, whereas in Aralosaurus the skull roof does not present any particular modification. The shape and the size of the crest-like structure of Aralosaurus is unknown. The fragments that were previously interpreted as a part of a gryposaur-like nasal arch and could have helped to reconstruct the circumnarial region of Aralosaurus, have been lost. So, the discovery of more complete specimens is necessary for a better knowledge of the shape and the size of this hollow structure.

== Classification ==
The following cladogram was produced by Albert Prieto-Márquez and his colleagues in 2013, it shows the phylogeny of Lambeosaurinae. Aralosaurus is closely related to Canardia and both genera are included in the tribe of Aralosaurini, which are identified as the most basal members of Lambeosaurinae.

- Lambeosaurinae
  - Aralosaurini
    - Aralosaurus
    - Canardia
  - - Jaxartosaurus
    - - Tsintaosaurini
        - Tsintaosaurus
        - Pararhabdodon
      - - Parasaurolophini
          - Charonosaurus
          - Parasaurolophus
            - Parasaurolophus cyrtocristatus
            - - Parasaurolophus tubicen
              - Parasaurolophus walkeri
        - Lambeosaurini
          - Lambeosaurus
            - Lambeosaurus lambei
            - Lambeosaurus magnicristatus
          - - Corythosaurus
              - Corythosaurus casuarius
              - Corythosaurus intermedius
            - - "Hypacrosaurus" stebingeri
              - - Hypacrosaurus
                - Olorotitan
                - - Arenysaurus
                  - Blasisaurus
                - - Magnapaulia
                  - - Velafrons
                    - - Amurosaurus
                      - Sahaliyania

== Paleobiogeography ==
Aralosaurus lived about 20 million years before its close relative Canardia. The latter inhabited the Ibero-Armorican Island, which was the westernmost island of the Late Cretaceous European Archipelago. As no lambeosaurines were known in the rich localities of late Campanian and early Maastrichtian ages of the Ibero-Armorican Island, it was suggested that the descendants of Aralosaurus had to reach this island rather late, perhaps at the end of the early Maastrichtian or during the late Maastrichtian. The discovery later in Spain of numerous lambeosaurines remains in the highest levels of the lower Maastrichtian argues for the first hypothesis. This migration was probably carried out in several stages, firstly by temporary terrestrial links between the landmass of Western Asia and the eastern islands of the European archipelago, then between the different European islands up to the Ibero-Armorican Island. Canardia was a rather archaic form for its time and the Ibero-Armorican Island was perhaps an ultimate refuge for the Aralosaurini.

== Paleoecology ==
The sediments of the Bostobe Formation consist mainly of clays and sandstones, and correspond to floodplain and estuarine environments in a subtropical to tropical climate. These different biotopes were located on the west coast of the Asian continent of the time, on the edge of the ancient Turgai Sea which connected the Tethys to the Arctic Ocean. The shallow marine waters west of this fluvial coastal plain were the site of intense organic productivity due to upwelling conditions caused by strong winds from the mainland. These winds were also the cause of a significant aridification of the climate in this region during the Santonian and early Campanian, causing a change in the flora of angiosperms, with a rarefaction of broad-leaved forms and a proliferation of small and narrow-leaved species of the family Ulmaceae. Angiosperms accounted for 75% of the flora of these biotopes, the rest being conifers and rare ginkgos and cycads.

The locality of Shakh Shakh, where Aralosaurus was found, yielded a diverse fauna including many fish (chondrichthyans, chondrosteans, and holosteans), Anura, at least six species of turtles some of which had a carapace at least 75 cm long, a scincomorph, crocodylians, pterosaurs (Aralazhdarcho), birds, mammals, and several undetermined dinosaur species (Ankylosauridae, Sauropoda, Tyrannosauroidea, Ornithomimidae, Therizinosauroidea, Troodontidae, and Dromaeosauridae). Elsewhere in this formation, the site of Akkurgan is distinguished by the presence of the two basal hadrosauroids Arstanosaurus and Batyrosaurus, as well as the pterosaur Samrukia (whose jaw was first attributed to an Caenagnathid oviraptorosaur, then to a giant bird), which could be a junior synonym of Aralazhdarcho.

== See also ==
- Timeline of hadrosaur research
