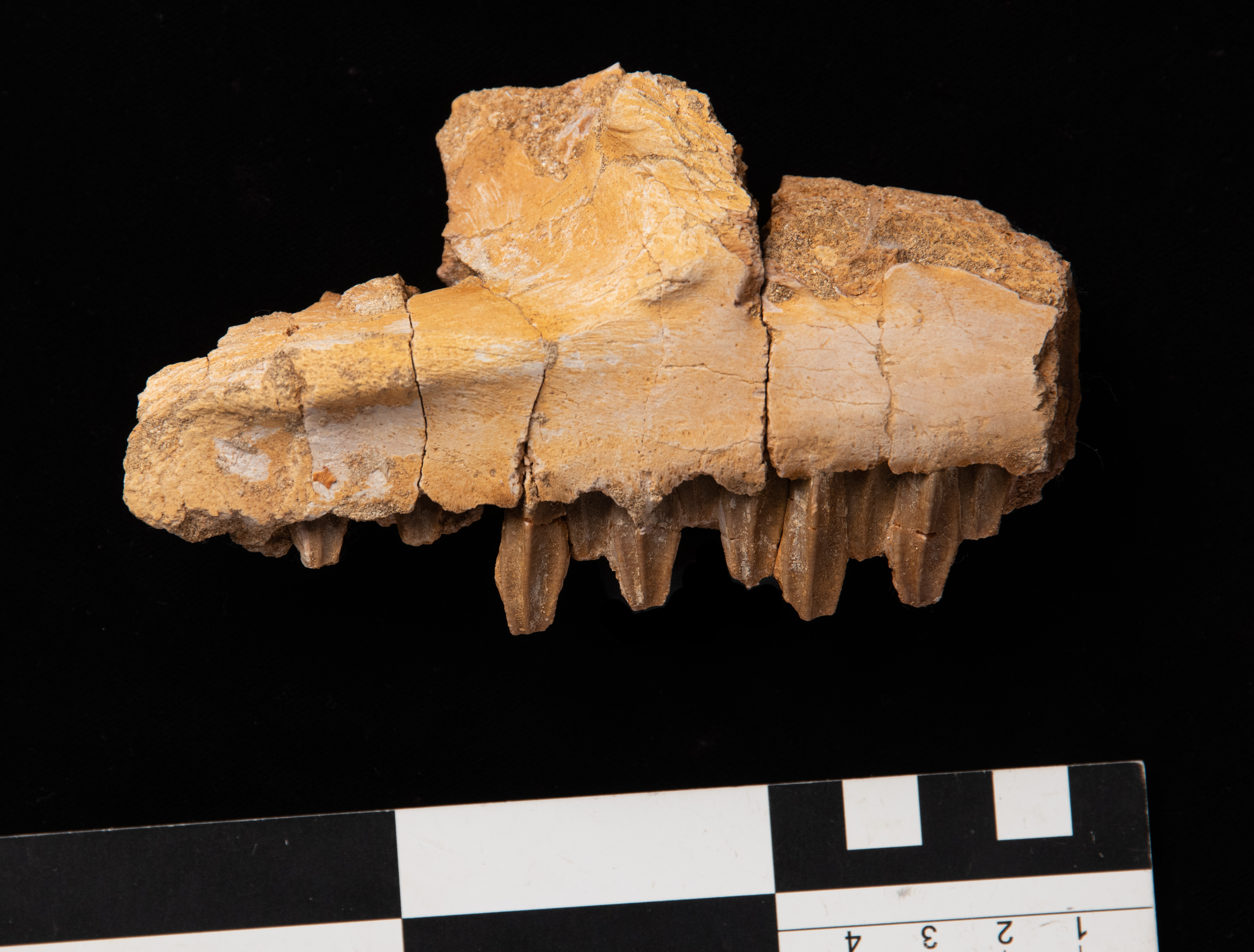
- Right maxilla of the holotype

Scientific classification
- Kingdom: Animalia
- Phylum: Chordata
- Class: Reptilia
- Clade: Dinosauria
- Clade: †Ornithischia
- Clade: †Ornithopoda
- Family: †Hadrosauridae
- Subfamily: †Lambeosaurinae
- Tribe: †Arenysaurini
- Genus: †Taleta; Longrich et al., 2025
- Species: †T. taleta

Binomial name
- †Taleta taleta Longrich et al., 2025

= Taleta =

Taleta Temporal range: Late Cretaceous (late Maastrichtian), 67–66 Ma

Genus of hadrosaurid dinosaurs

Taleta (meaning "three") is an extinct genus of lambeosaurine ornithopod dinosaurs from the Late Cretaceous (Maastrichtian age) Oulad Abdoun Basin of Morocco. The genus contains a single species, Taleta taleta, known from two upper jaw bones. It is the third member of the clade Arenysaurini found from this locality, after Ajnabia and Minqaria.

== Discovery and naming ==
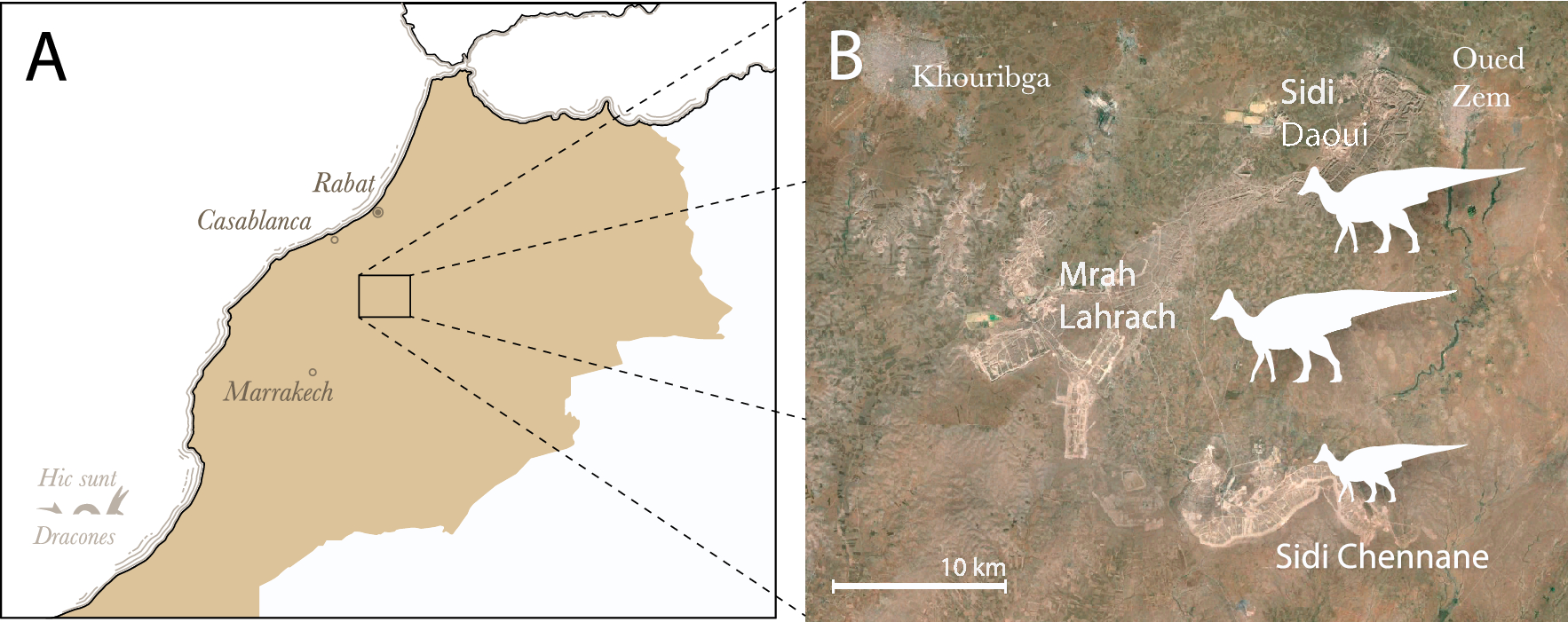
Locations of lambeosaurine discoveries in Morocco; Taleta was found at the 'Sidi Chennane' locality

The Taleta holotype specimen, MHNM.KH.1557, was discovered in a layer of the Oulad Abdoun Basin (upper Couche III, Sidi Chennane locality) of Morocco. The specimen consists of a partial left and right maxilla (upper jaw bone). The bones were found in association and exhibit comparable preservation and morphology, implying they came from the same individual.

In 2025, Nicholas Longrich and colleagues described Taleta taleta as a new genus and species of lambeosaurine hadrosaurs based on these fossil remains. The generic and specific names derive from an Arabic word meaning "three", referencing Taleta as the third hadrosaur named from the type locality after Ajnabia and Minqaria.

== Description ==
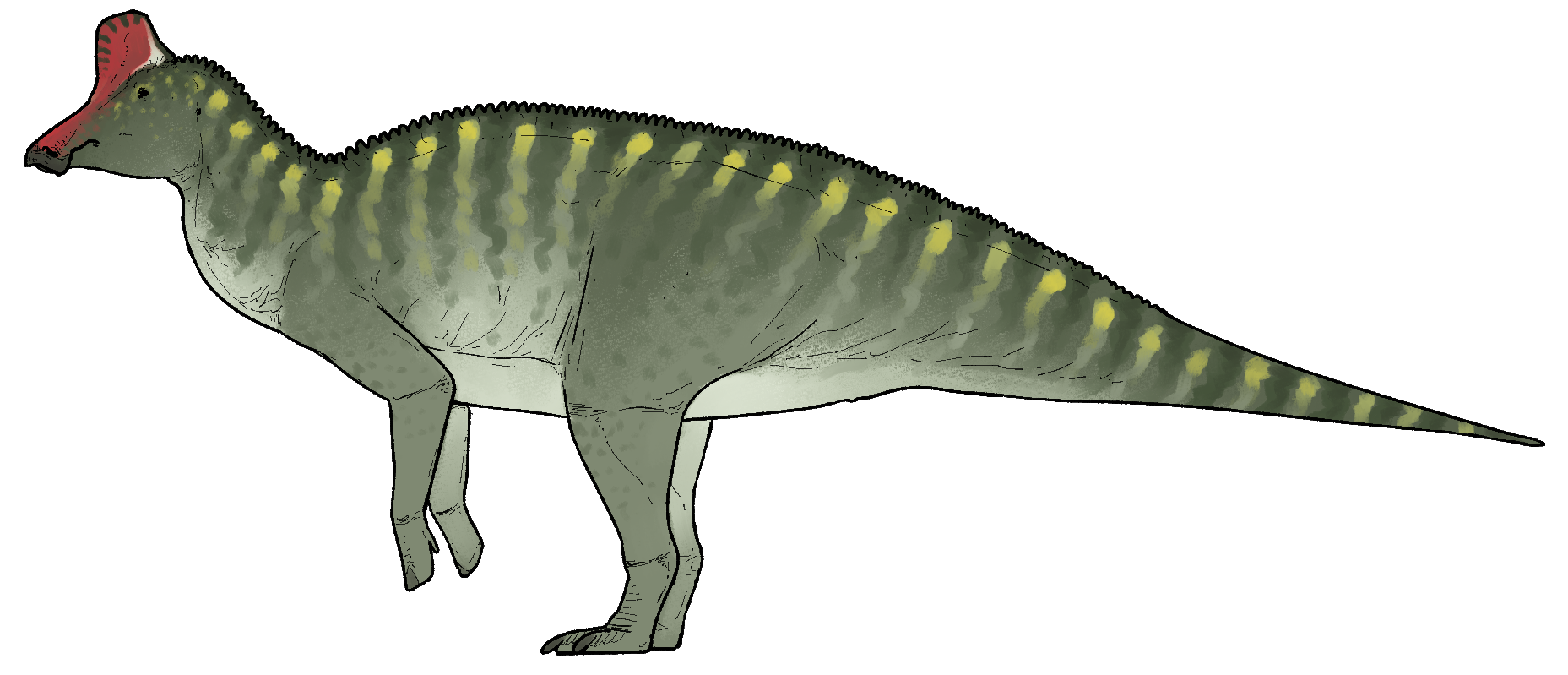
Speculative life restoration

The Taleta holotype belongs to a small-bodied hadrosaurid, or 'duckbilled' dinosaur. As preserved, the incomplete right maxilla is 12.5 cm (4.9 in) long and includes sixteen alveoli (tooth sockets), but may have been up to 17.5–8 cm (6.9–3.1 in) when complete with 25 alveoli. The left maxilla is less complete, at 8 cm (3.1 in) long, generally overlapping with its right counterpart. The holotype is similar in size to the coeval Ajnabia and Minqaria, the latter of which has been estimated at 3.5 metres (11 ft) long. The bone texture on the maxilla suggests that the holotype likely belongs to a mature individual. While the maxilla of Taleta demonstrates anatomical features comparable to both of its contemporaries, it also has several unique traits that support its distinction. Most notably, the teeth are particularly large, presumably leading to a reduced tooth count in the upper jaw.

== Classification ==
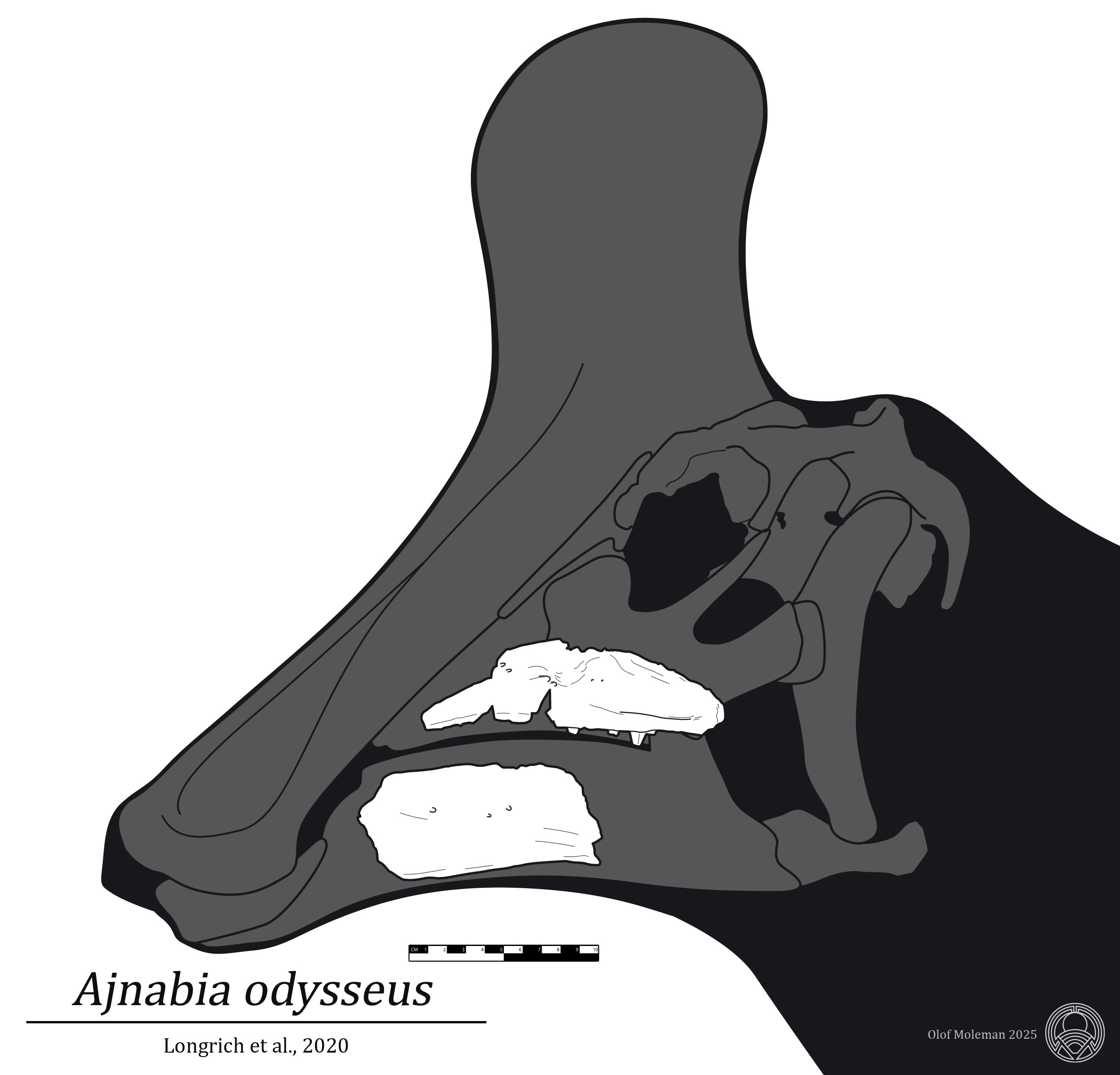
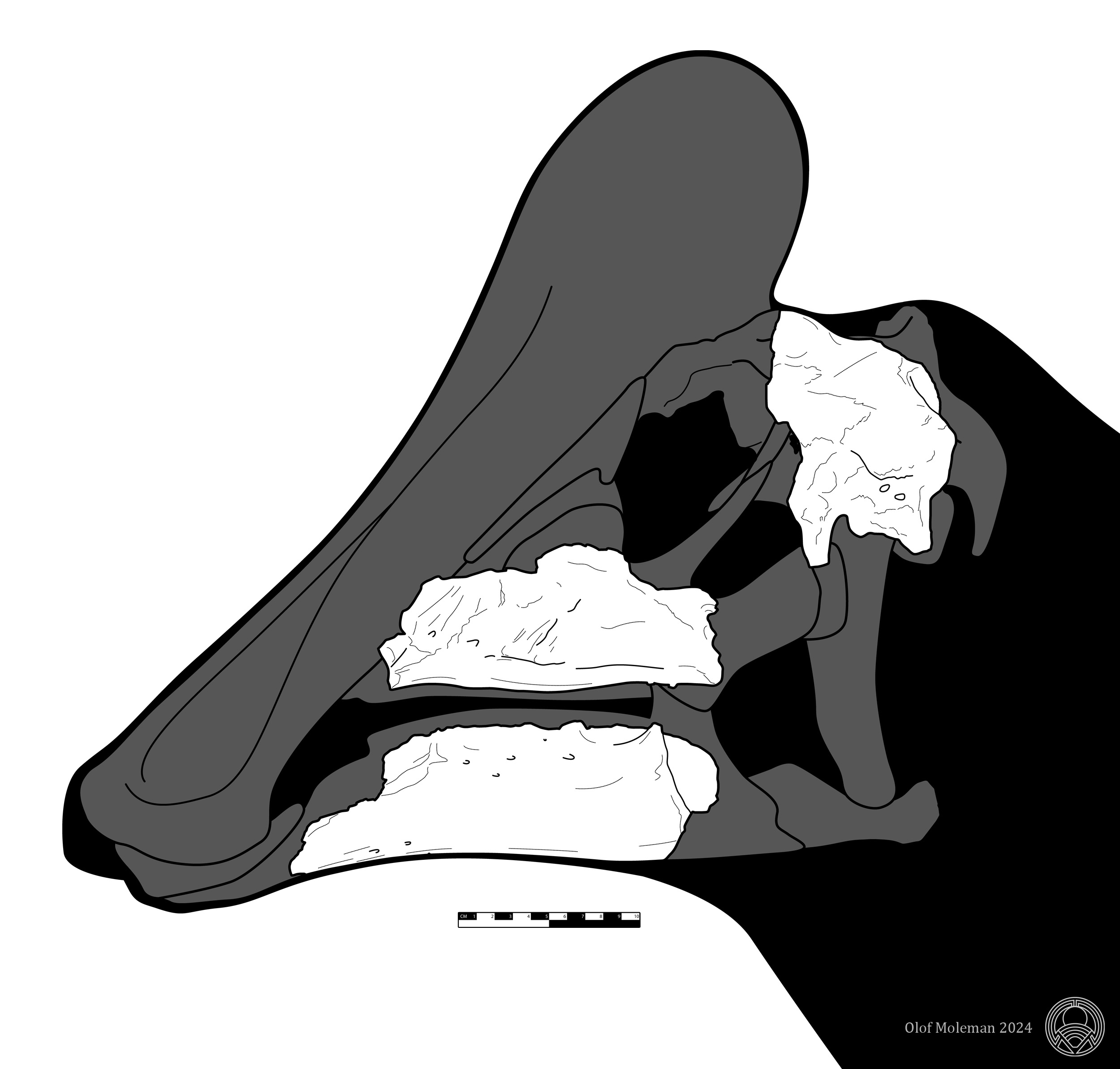
Reconstructed skulls of Ajnabia (left) and Minqaria (right), two presumed close relatives, with known material in white

Close-up of teeth

In their phylogenetic analysis, Longrich and colleagues (2025) recovered Taleta within the hadrosaurid clade Lambeosaurinae. It was found in a poorly-resolved Arenysaurini, in a clade also containing the coeval Ajnabia and Minqaria. These results are displayed in the cladogram below. The authors observed that the Taleta holotype shares some features only with Ajnabia, or only with Minqaria. However, it also exhibits plesiomorphic (ancestral condition) anatomical traits. This may indicate that Ajnabia and Minqaria were more closely related to each other than they were to Taleta.

- Lambeosaurinae
  - Aralosaurus
  - - Jaxartosaurus
    - - Tsintaosaurus
      - - - Parasaurolophini
          - Lambeosaurini
        - Arenysaurini
          - Adynomosaurus
          - Arenysaurus
          - Basturs Poble arenysaurin
          - Blasisaurus
          - Canardia
          - Koutalisaurus
          - Pararhabdodon
          - Serrat del Rostiar arenysaurin
          - - Ajnabia
            - Minqaria
            - Taleta

== Paleoecology ==
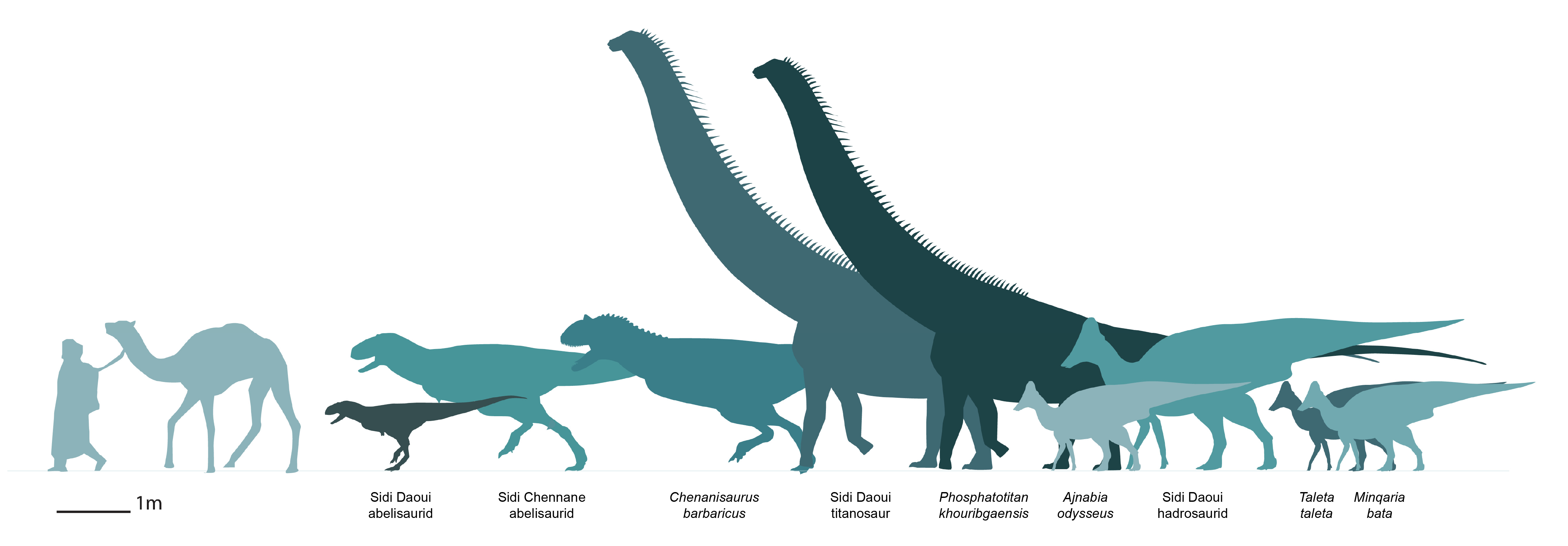
Dinosaurs from the Moroccan Maastrichtian Phosphates including Taleta, Ajnabia, and Minqaria at the right

Taleta is known from the phosphates of the Ouled Abdoun Basin of central Morocco. The phosphates preserve a nearshore marine environment dominated by mosasaurs, fish, and other marine animals. Dinosaurs are less common, but include diverse and abundant hadrosaurids, including fellow arenysaurins Ajnabia and Minqaria. A right femur and left humerus from these outcrops belong to larger unnamed hadrosaurids, likely close relatives of these genera. Other dinosaurs include the abelisaurid Chenanisaurus and an unnamed titanosaurian. A right tibia and isolated metatarsal may belong to distinct smaller abelisaurids. These animals lived at the end of the Cretaceous period (latest Maastrichtian), shortly before the Chicxulub asteroid impact and K-Pg boundary, the point at which the dinosaurs and many other groups went extinct.

== Paleobiogeography ==
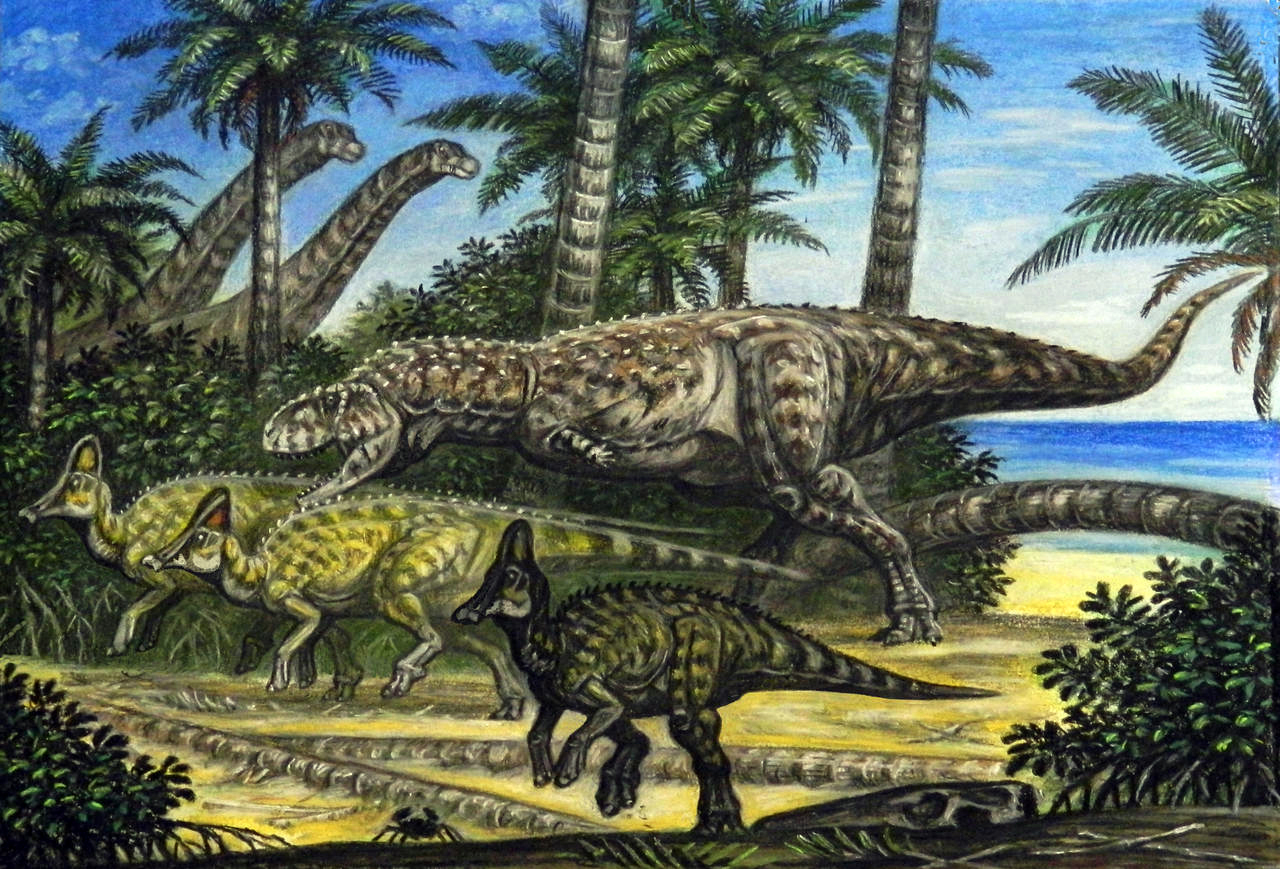
Speculative reconstruction of the fauna contemporary with Taleta, including Ajnabia and Chenanisaurus

Hadrosaurids, the taxonomic group Taleta belongs to, were not known from Africa until Ajnabia was described in 2021. followed by Minqaria in 2024. Their closest relatives are lambeosaurines, all known from Europe. As such, oceanic dispersal between Europe and North Africa is considered the most viable explanation for the presence of hadrosaurs in Africa. Intermittent land connections as a means of dispersal could also explain this. Dispersal may have occurred via swimming, drifting, or rafting (on floating debris or vegetation clumps).
