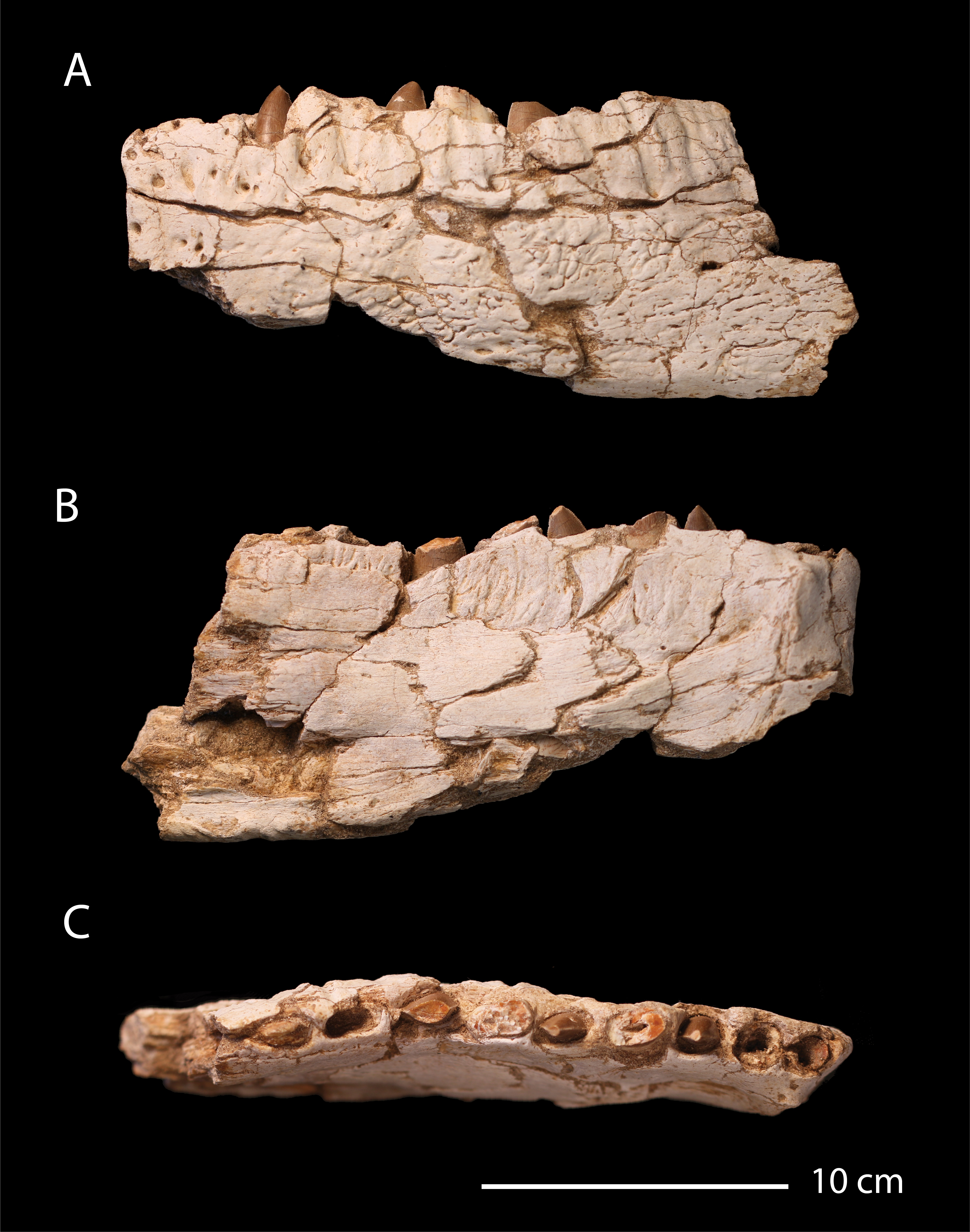
- Holotype partial dentary of Chenanisaurus barbaricus

Scientific classification
- Kingdom: Animalia
- Phylum: Chordata
- Class: Reptilia
- Clade: Dinosauria
- Clade: Saurischia
- Clade: Theropoda
- Family: †Abelisauridae
- Genus: †Chenanisaurus; Longrich et al., 2017
- Species: †C. barbaricus

Binomial name
- †Chenanisaurus barbaricus Longrich et al., 2017

= Chenanisaurus =

Chenanisaurus Temporal range: Late Cretaceous, Maastrichtian

Extinct genus of dinosaurs

Chenanisaurus (meaning "Sidi Chennane lizard") is a genus of theropod dinosaur that lived during the Late Cretaceous in what is now Morocco. The genus belongs to the family Abelisauridae. It is known from a partial dentary (lower jawbone) and several teeth that were found in the phosphate mines of Khouribga, in rocks of the Maastrichtian-aged Ouled Abdoun Basin. Chenanisaurus was described in 2017 by British paleontologist Nicholas Longrich and colleagues. The genus contains a single species, Chenanisaurus barbaricus.

Chenanisaurus is one of few known African members of Abelisauridae. Its length is estimated to be around 7–8 m (23–26 ft), making it among the largest known abelisaurids. The dentary of Chenanisaurus is distinct in that it was deep and slightly bowed. The outer surface is ornamented with deep striations, grooves, and rugosities, as in related forms such as Majungasaurus.

Chenanisaurus was among the last non-avian dinosaurs, existing just one million years prior to the Cretaceous–Paleogene extinction event. It was found in the Ouled Abdoun Basin, which was a marine environment at the time Chenanisaurus lived. It is one of several dinosaurs known from the phosphates, living alongside the titanosaurian sauropod Phosphatotitan, the hadrosaurids Ajnabia, Minqaria, and Taleta, and other abelisaurids. As for non-dinosaurs, a host of pterosaurs, mosasaurs, plesiosaurs, fish, and sharks are also known from the Ouled Abdoun Basin.

== Discovery and naming ==
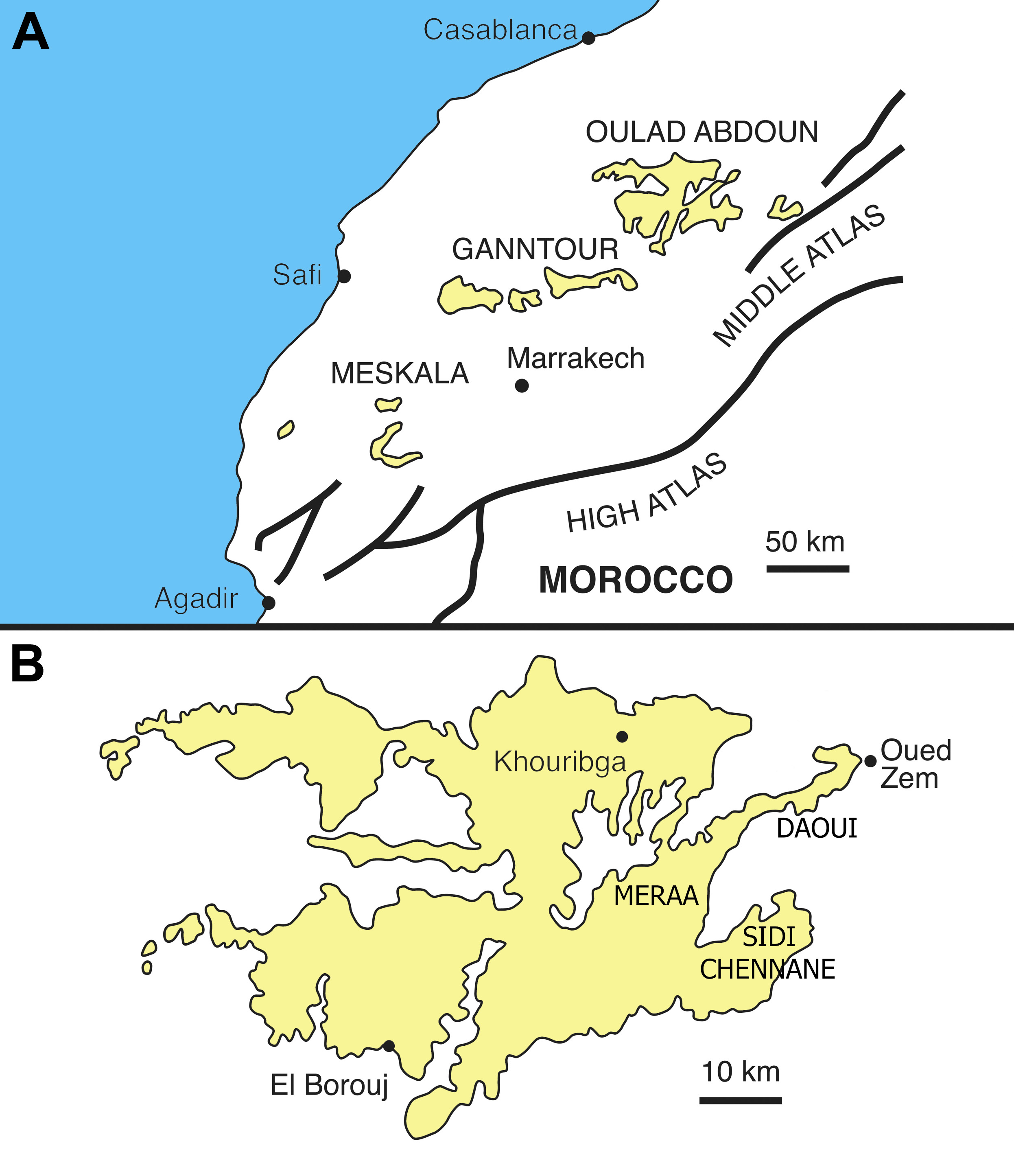
Map of western Morocco with the Ouled Abdoun Basin, where Chenanisaurus was found, in yellow

Fossils of Chenanisaurus were first discovered in the phosphate mine of Couche III, an outcrop of the Ouled Abdoun Basin in the Sidi Chennane mines outside of Khouribga in northern Morocco. The remains known of Chenanisaurus consist of a single, incomplete dentary, cataloged as OCP DEK-GE 772 at the Office Cherifien des Phosphates in Khouribga. Additionally, two premaxillary teeth from Sidi Daoui and a maxillary tooth found at either Sidi Chennane or Sidi Daoui also belong to Chenanisaurus. The Ouled Abdoun Basin, where these fossils were found, date to the late Maastrichtian age of the Late Cretaceous period.

In 2017, British paleontologist Nicholas Longrich and colleagues described the remains and assigned them to a new genus and species of theropod, which they named Chenanisaurus barbaricus. The generic name Chenanisaurus is derived from Sidi Chennane, where the dentary was found, and the Greek root "sauros" meaning "lizard". The specific name comes from the Greek word "barbaros" meaning "barbaric" and also refers to Barbary, as in the Barbary Coast of Morocco and northwest Africa. The incomplete dentary was chosen as the holotype (name-bearing) specimen, whereas the premaxillary teeth and maxillary tooth were assigned based on size, traits, and provenance.

The maxillary tooth assigned to Chenanisaurus had previously been described in a 2005 study by French paleontologist Eric Buffetaut and colleagues, which stated the tooth came from an indeterminate abelisaurid theropod. Chenanisaurus was and is the only abelisaurid described from the Maastrichtian of North Africa and is the only named Moroccan abelisaurid. Additionally, the discovery of Chenanisaurus was a surprise since the Ouled Abdoun Basin primarily preserves marine fossils.

== Description ==
Being an abelisaurid theropod, Chenanisaurus would have been a bipedal (two-legged) carnivore. Many abelisaurids have extremely small forelimbs and long hind limbs adapted for running. Chenanisaurus is believed to have been large for an abelisaurid given the size of the holotype dentary and assigned teeth. Longrich and colleagues initial description of Chenanisaurus estimated its length at 7–8 m (23–26 ft), comparable to the size of other large abelisaurids like Carnotaurus and Pycnonemosaurus. Similarly, Buffetaut and colleague's description of the maxillary tooth gave a skull length estimate of 50–60 cm (1.6–2.0 ft) and a body length estimate of 7–8 m (23–26 ft).

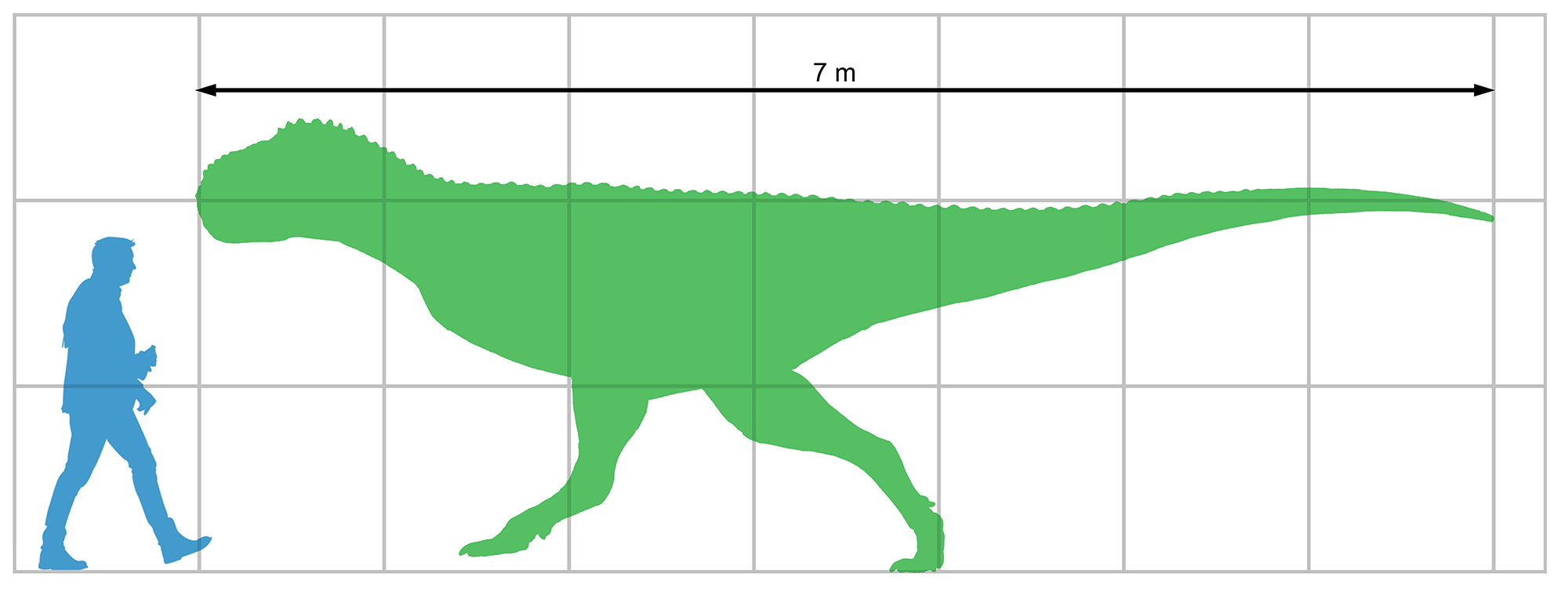
Size chart of Chenanisaurus

=== Dentary ===
The dentary is missing its posterior (back) end and is damaged in several areas. It preserves ten alveoli (tooth positions) with three preserved tooth crowns and four broken crowns. The first tooth was small, a trait observed in other ceratosaurs (the group containing abelisaurids and noasaurids). Relative to the dimensions of the alveoli, the dentary is deep, implying Chenanisaurus had a proportionately short, tall lower jaw. Carnotaurus and Ekrixinatosaurus also had proportionally deep jaws, though not as deep as in Chenanisaurus. The dorsal and ventral (top and bottom) margins of the dentary are curved in lateral (side) view, indicating that the bone was bowed ventrally like in Carnotaurus.

The front margin of the dentary is almost vertical, in contrast to the rounded front margins of Majungasaurus and Ekrixinatosaurus. Chenanisaurus' interdental plates are deep, a feature of derived abelisaurids, and are ornamented with shallow grooves. The curvature of the dentary suggests that the mandible was U-shaped and broad in dorsal (top) view.

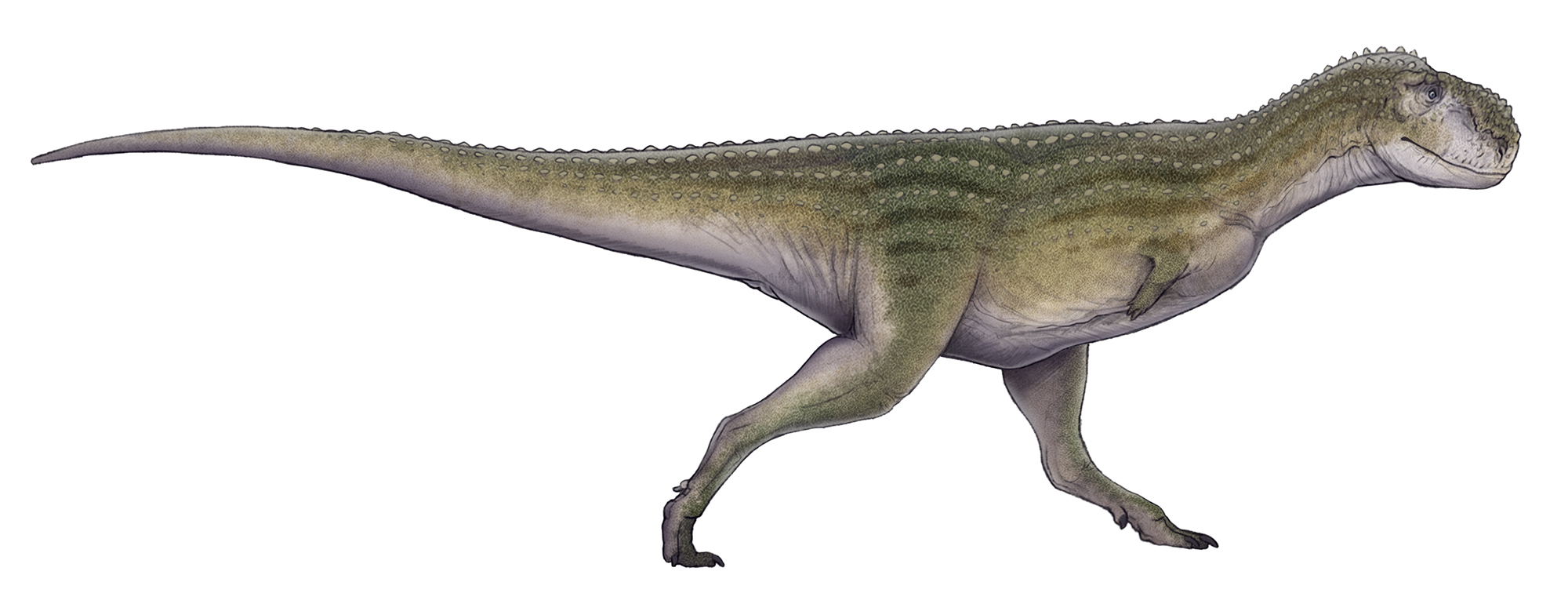
Life restoration of Chenanisaurus

The lateral (outside) surface of the dentary bears a groove that runs along its length. This groove is bordered dorsally by a pattern of foramina (small openings) that open upwards into dorsally-extended sulci (grooves). This pattern of grooves and foramina is found in other abelisaurids, but in derived taxa like Carnotaurus the groove is situated lower on the dentary. The condition in Chenanisaurus is more similar to that of the basal ceratosaur Genyodectes than other abelisaurids, showing its distinctness from other abelisaurids. Like in Carnotaurus and Majungasaurus, the lateral surface of the dentary has a sculptured appearance created by pits and ridges.

=== Teeth ===
Overall, the teeth of Chenanisaurus are tall and slender. The alveoli are rectangular in dorsal (top) view. The dentary carries at least ten teeth, though there are fifteen dentary teeth in other abelisaurids like Carnotaurus. The teeth change in shape going posteriorly, with the front teeth having a D-shaped cross section and a convex anterior face whereas the rear teeth are flatter and dagger-shaped. The cutting edges are convex and show up to thirteen denticles (serrations) per 5 millimetres (0.20 in) at the crown base and up to eight denticles near the apex.

As for the maxillary tooth specifically, its total height is 58 mm (2.3 in), with a crown height of 37 mm (1.5 in). The enamel is smooth, except for a weak wrinkle located towards the base of the crown. This is somewhat similar to the enamel wrinkles found on the teeth of Carcharodontosaurus, though not to the same extreme. Enamel wrinkles have been found on other theropods besides Carcharodontosaurus and Chenanisaurus, but they typically are due to growth anomalies in tooth formation. The posterior and anterior edges of the grown bear sharp carinae (keels), which have around 2 denticles per mm.

== Classification ==
Abelisaurids were widespread during the Late Cretaceous, with genera known from Africa, Europe, South America, and Asia. In Africa, abelisaurids had previously been known in areas like the Kem Kem Beds of Morocco and the Echkar Formation of Niger, but none had been found in the uppermost Cretaceous of Africa. The discovery of Chenanisaurus and titanosaur fossil in the Maastrichtian of Morocco suggests that the fauna of the region was similar to the latest Cretaceous faunas of South America, India, and Madagascar. However, the descriptions of hadrosaurs from the site indicates similarities with European faunas.

In their 2017 description of Chenanisaurus, Longrich et al. included this taxon in phylogenetic analyses based on the dataset created by Tortosa et al. (2014) and amended by Filippi et al. (2016). Chenanisaurus was placed near the base of the family Abelisauridae in a polytomy with Kryptops. While the known fossil material of Chenanisaurus is similar in shape to that of the short-snouted brachyrostrans, having proportionately deep jaws with bowed (curved) shape, the authors noted that more basal ceratosaurs such as Ceratosaurus and Genyodectes had a bowed lower jaw, and that basal abelisaurids such as Rugops also had short, deep skulls and jaws. For this reason, Longrich and colleagues suggested that Chenanisaurus may not necessarily be related to the brachyrostrans and that its specific affinities are ambiguous.

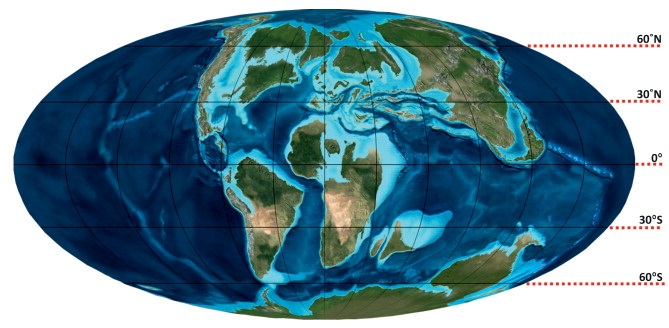
Map of the continents in the Late Cretaceous, the southern "Gondwanan" continents were diverging, and northern Africa was an island

- - - Noasauridae
    - Abelisauridae
      - Genyodectes
      - - Bajo Barreal abelisaurid
        - - Kryptops
          - Chenanisaurus
          - - Rugops
            - - Abelisaurinae
              - Carnotaurinae

In their phylogenetic analysis, Delcourt and Iori (2020) recovered Chenanisaurus as the sister taxon of an unnamed abelisaurid known as the Pourcieux taxon. The resulting cladogram is:

- Abelisauridae
  - - Chenanisaurus
    - Pourcieux taxon
  - - "Kryptops"
    - - Rugops
      - - Majungasaurinae
          - - Rajasaurus
            - Indosaurus
            - Majungasaurus
          - - Genusaurus
            - - Arcovenator
              - La Boucharde Taxon
        - Brachyrostra

== Paleoecology ==
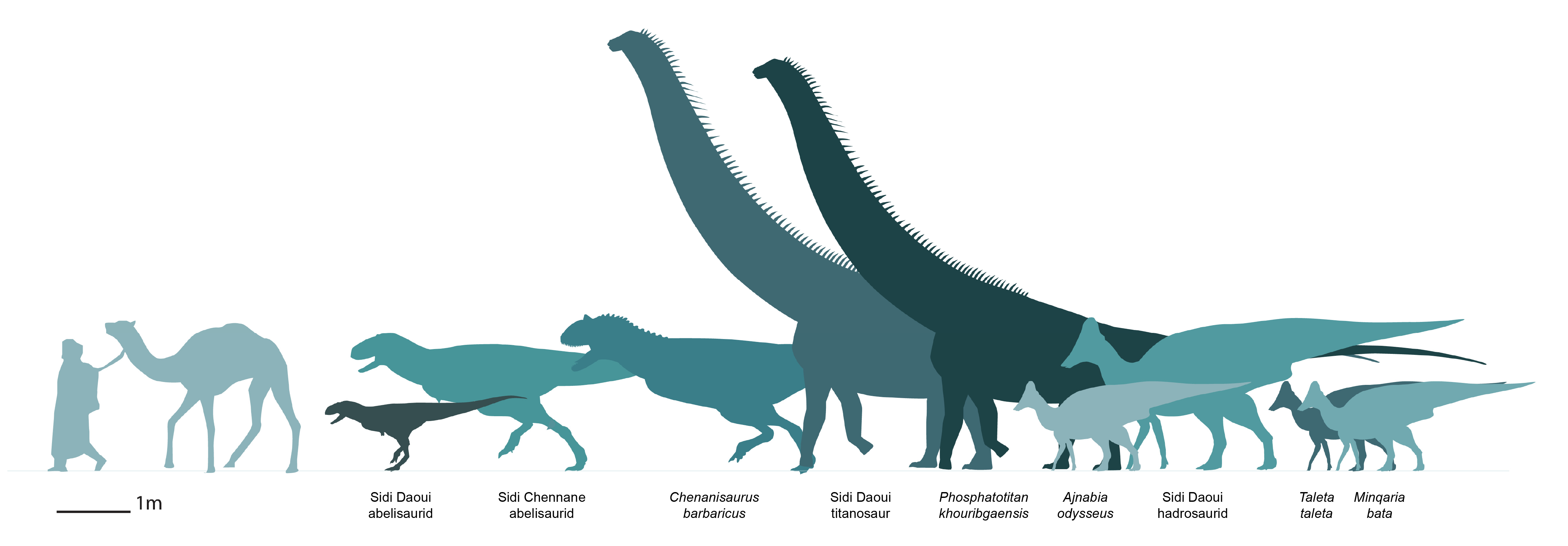
Dinosaurs from the Ouled Abdoun Basin, including Chenanisaurus in the middle

All known specimens of Chenanisaurus have been recovered from the phosphates of the Ouled Abdoun Basin of north-central Morocco. The phosphates are a nearshore marine environment dominated by sharks, fish, mosasaurs, and other marine reptiles. These include sharks like Squalicorax, mosasaurs like Carinodens and Halisaurus, plesiosaurs like Zarafasaura, and turtles like Alienochelys and Ocepechelon. Flying above the water were pterosaurs, such as the pteranodontians Tethydraco and Simurghia.

Dinosaur remains are rare, but several have been described such as fossils of smaller indeterminate abelisaurids, hadrosaurids Minqaria, Ajnabia, and Taleta, and titanosaurian sauropods including Phosphatotitan. Moroccan hadrosaurid fossils belonging to individuals of various sizes, including those of Minqaria and Taleta, indicate that hadrosaurs were diverse and abundant within the ecosystem. These dinosaurs would have lived in the very latest Cretaceous (late Maastrichtian), approximately 1 million years before the Chicxulub asteroid impact that caused the KPg Extinction Event.

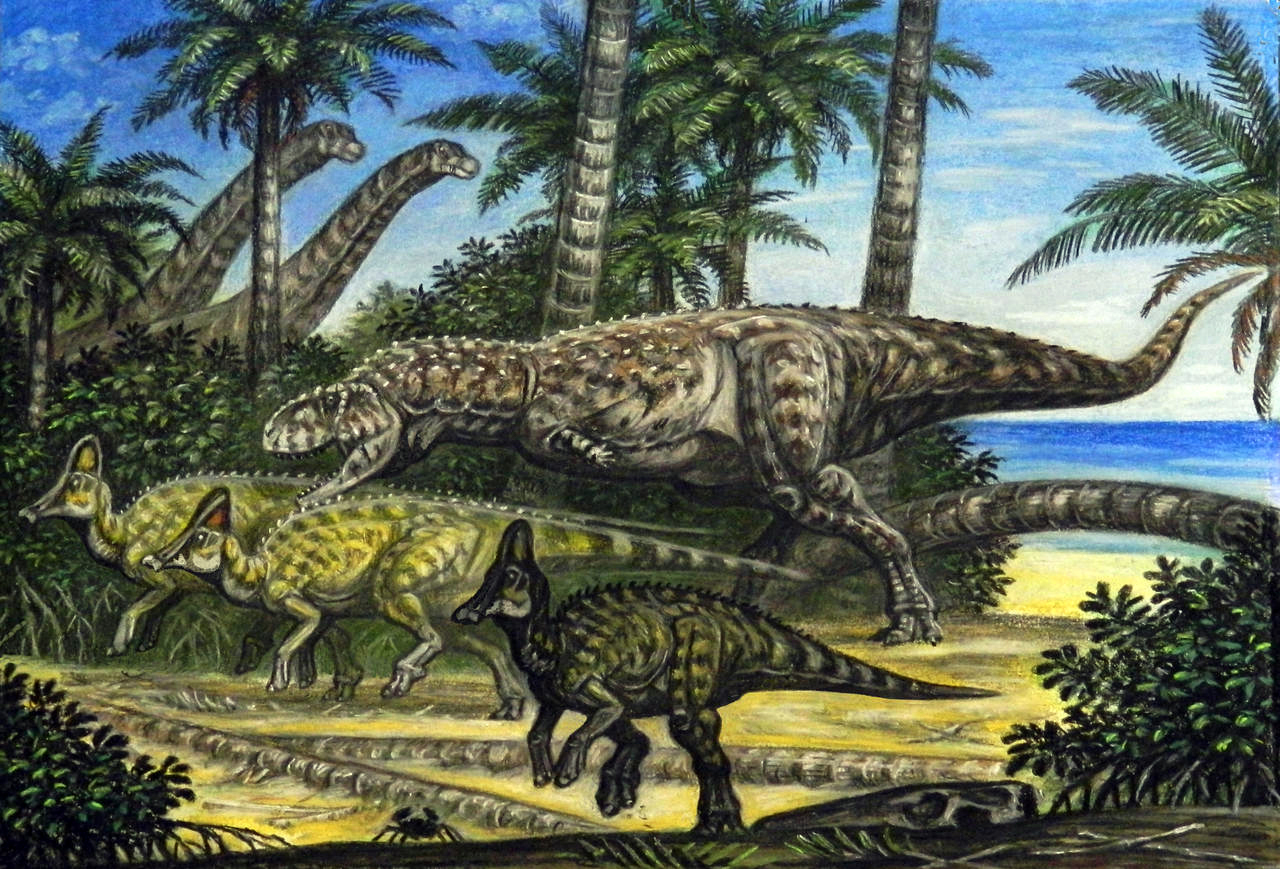
Restoration of Chenanisaurus hunting Ajnabia

=== Palaeobiogeography ===
More broadly speaking, the Maastrichtian fauna of the North African ecosystem Chenanisaurus inhabited seems biogeographically linked more to Gondwanan faunas – that is, those of the southern continents – than that of Europe and the other Laurasian continents of the Northern Hemisphere. Whilst Laurasia is characterized by tyrannosaurids, ceratopsids, and herbivorous coelurosaurs, Gondwana is dominated by titanosaurs and abelisaurs, as seen in Morocco. Despite this, a degree of endemism is noted, similar to that of other Gondwanan continents. A small abelisaur from the Sidi Daoui region is unlike those from South America or India but may be related to North African forms from earlier in the Cretaceous or similarly sized abelisaurs in Europe; likewise, Chenanisaurus may represent a distinct lineage from other known abelisaurs. Inversely, other Gondwanan animals from South America, such as ankylosaurs, unenlagiines, elasmarians, and megaraptorids, are absent from Africa. This endemism is explained by the fragmentation of the former Gondwanan supercontinent into increasingly distant landmasses, leading to the ancestrally linked faunas of different southern continents becoming distinct. Even within the African continent, the presence of a Trans-Saharan seaway connecting the Tethys Ocean of Europe to the Gulf of Guinea may have isolated the fauna of Northern Africa from more southern portions of the continent, such as fossil-bearing sites in Kenya, and Morocco itself may have been an isolated island.

== See also ==
- Timeline of ceratosaur research
- 2017 in archosaur paleontology
