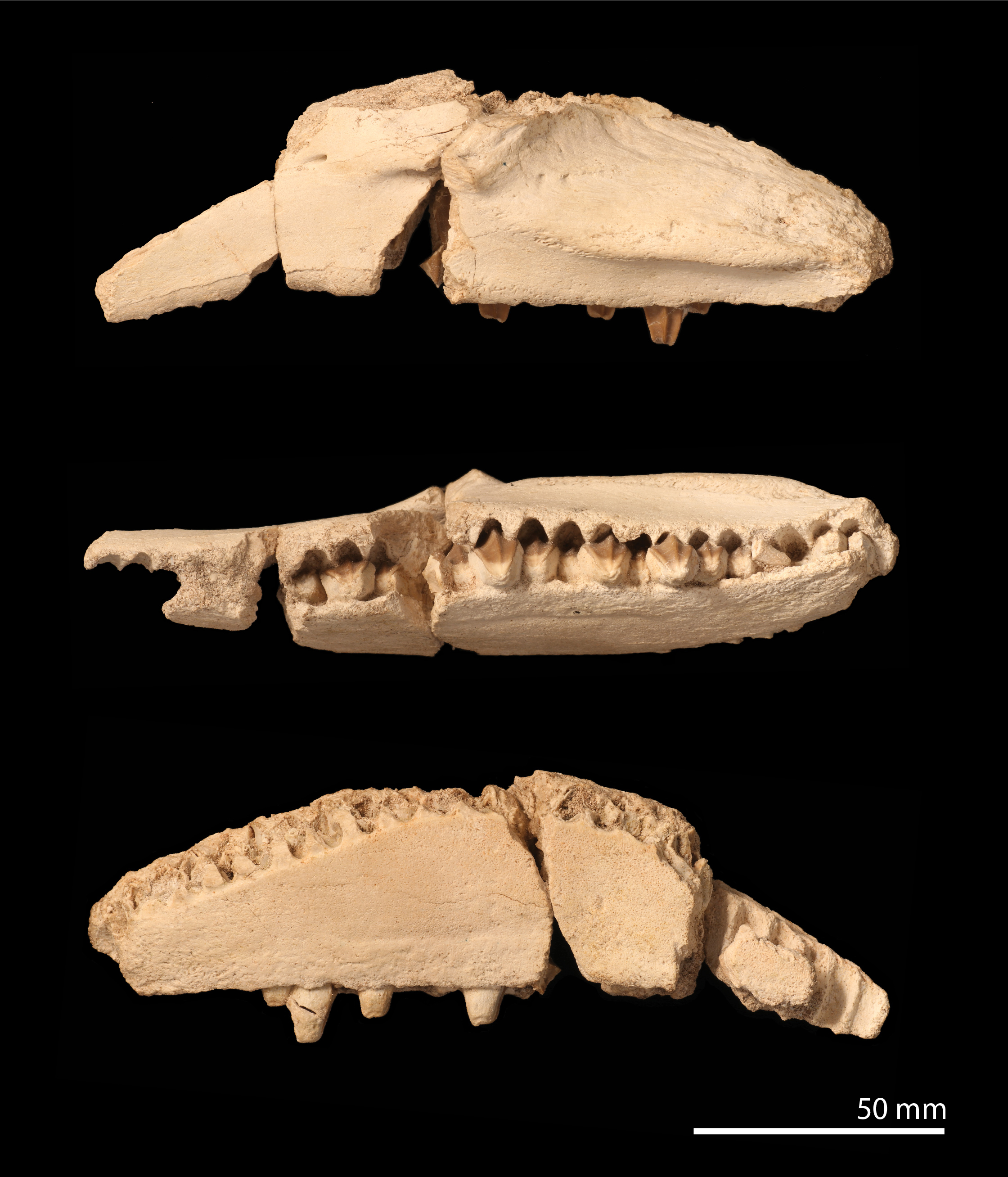
- Holotype maxilla

Scientific classification
- Kingdom: Animalia
- Phylum: Chordata
- Class: Reptilia
- Clade: Dinosauria
- Clade: †Ornithischia
- Clade: †Ornithopoda
- Family: †Hadrosauridae
- Subfamily: †Lambeosaurinae
- Genus: †Ajnabia; Longrich et al., 2021

Type species
- †Ajnabia odysseus Longrich et al., 2021

= Ajnabia =

Ajnabia Temporal range: Late Maastrichtian, 68–66 Ma

Extinct genus of reptiles

Ajnabia (meaning "stranger" or "foreigner") is a genus of lambeosaurine hadrosaur from the Late Cretaceous (Maastrichtian) of Morocco. It is the first definitive hadrosaur from Africa and is thought to be related to European hadrosaurs like Adynomosaurus and Pararhabdodon. The discovery of Ajnabia came as a surprise to the paleontologists who found it because Africa was isolated by water from the rest of the world during the Cretaceous, such that hadrosaurs were assumed to have been unable to reach the continent.

== Discovery and naming ==
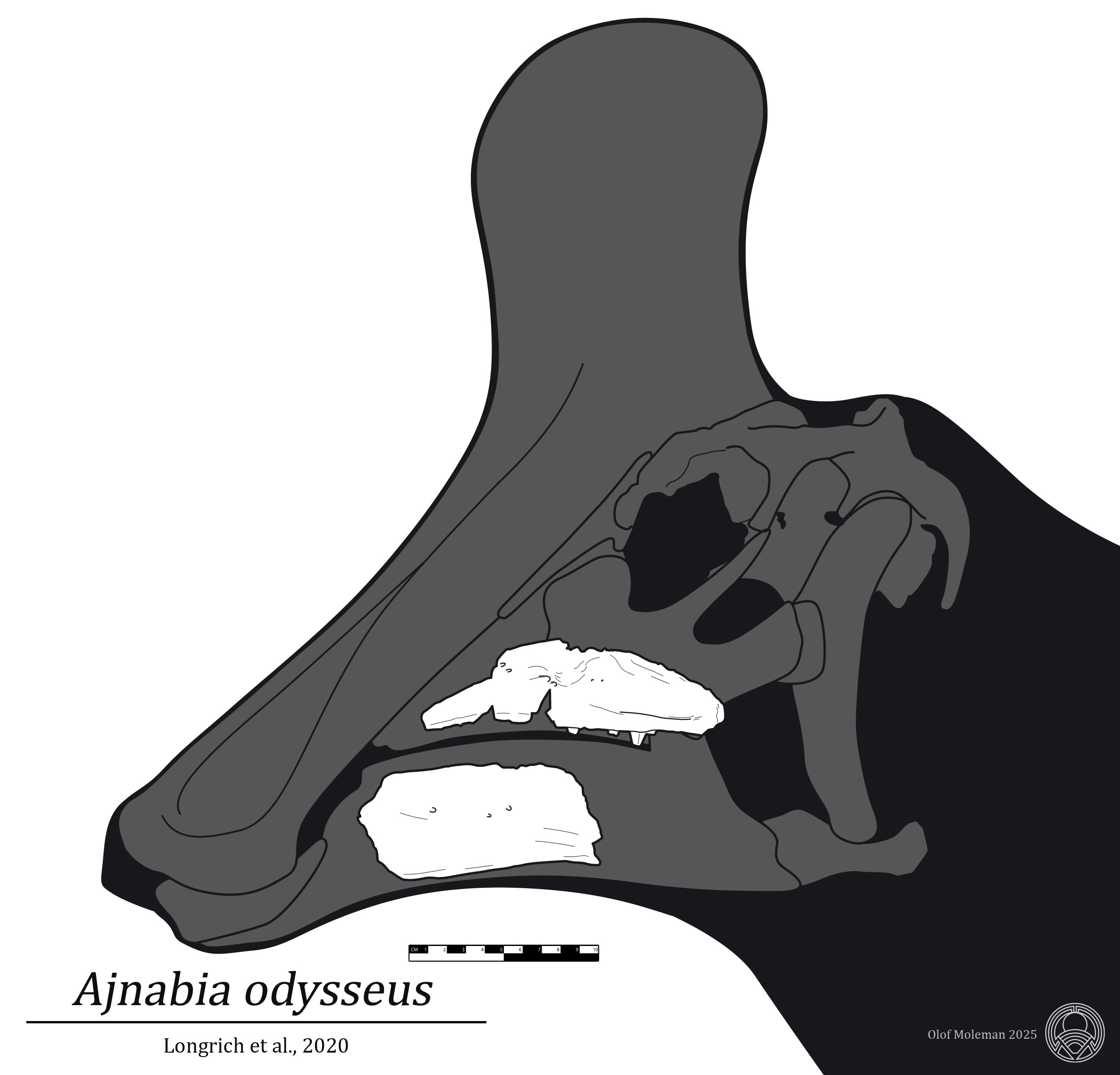
Reconstructed skull with known material in white

Ajnabia was recovered from the Late Maastrichtian strata of the phosphate mines at Sidi Chennane, in Khouribga Province, Morocco. Recovered elements include most of the left maxilla and part of the right, and a fragment of the right dentary. The name Ajnabia derives from the Arabic أجنبي (ajnabi), meaning "strange" or "foreign", referring to the animal as part of a dinosaur lineage that immigrated to Africa from elsewhere. The type and only species is A. odysseus, referring to the Greek hero and legendary sea voyager Odysseus.

== Description ==
As preserved, the incomplete maxilla is 15.6 centimetres (6.1 in) long, with the anterior (toward the front) and dorsal (toward the top) edges broken. When complete, it may have been around 19–20 centimetres (7.5–7.9 in) long. Twenty-three alveoli (tooth sockets) are preserved in the maxilla. Ajnabia is a small hadrosaur, similar in size to its contemporary relative Minqaria, which is estimated to have reached 3.5 metres (11 ft) in total body length.

== Classification ==
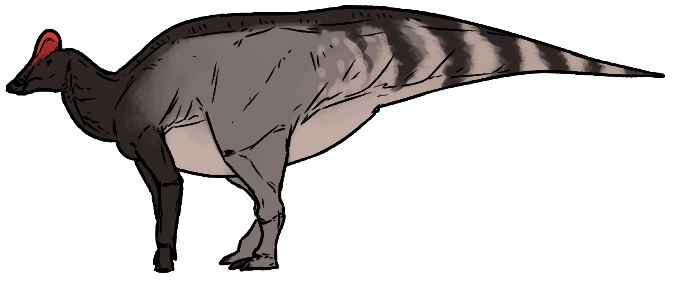
Speculative life restoration

In their 2021 phylogenetic analysis, Longrich et al. recovered Ajanbia as the sister taxon to Blasisaurus, a hadrosaur from the Arén Formation of Spain. Their results supported a clade including all European hadrosaurids in addition to Ajnabia within the Lambeosaurinae, which the authors named the Arenysaurini, defined as the taxa more closely related to Arenysaurus than Tsintaosaurus, Parasaurolophus, or Lambeosaurus.

- Arenysaurini
  - - Arenysaurus
    - Pararhabdodon
  - - Koutalisaurus
    - - - Basturs lambeosaurine
        - Canardia
      - - Adynomosaurus
        - - Serrat del Rostiar lambeosaurine
          - - Blasisaurus
            - Ajnabia

In a separate analysis in 2022, Ramírez-Velasco did not recover an arenysaurin clade; instead, these taxa were distributed throughout the Lambeosaurinae. Ajnabia was found to be the sister taxon to Pararhabdodon within the Tsintaosaurini, which also included the European Adynomosaurus and Asian Tsintaosaurus. Arenysaurus and Blasisaurus were found to be within the Lambeosaurini, and Canardia as the sister taxon to Corythosauria. These results are displayed in the cladogram below, with European taxa ('arenysaurins') highlighted.

- Lambeosaurinae
  - Aralosaurus
  - - Tsintaosaurini
      - Adynomosaurus
      - - Tsintaosaurus
        - - Ajnabia
          - Pararhabdodon
    - - Jaxartosaurus
      - - Canardia
        - Corythosauria
          - Parasaurolophini
          - Lambeosaurini
            - - Amurosaurus
              - Sahaliyania
            - - Velafrons
              - - Latirhinus
                - - Magnapaulia
                  - - - Hypacrosaurus stebingeri
                      - - Corythosaurus spp.
                        - Lambeosaurus spp.
                    - - - Arenysaurus
                        - Blasisaurus
                      - - Hypacrosaurus altispinus
                        - - Angulomastacator
                          - Olorotitan

== Palaeoecology ==
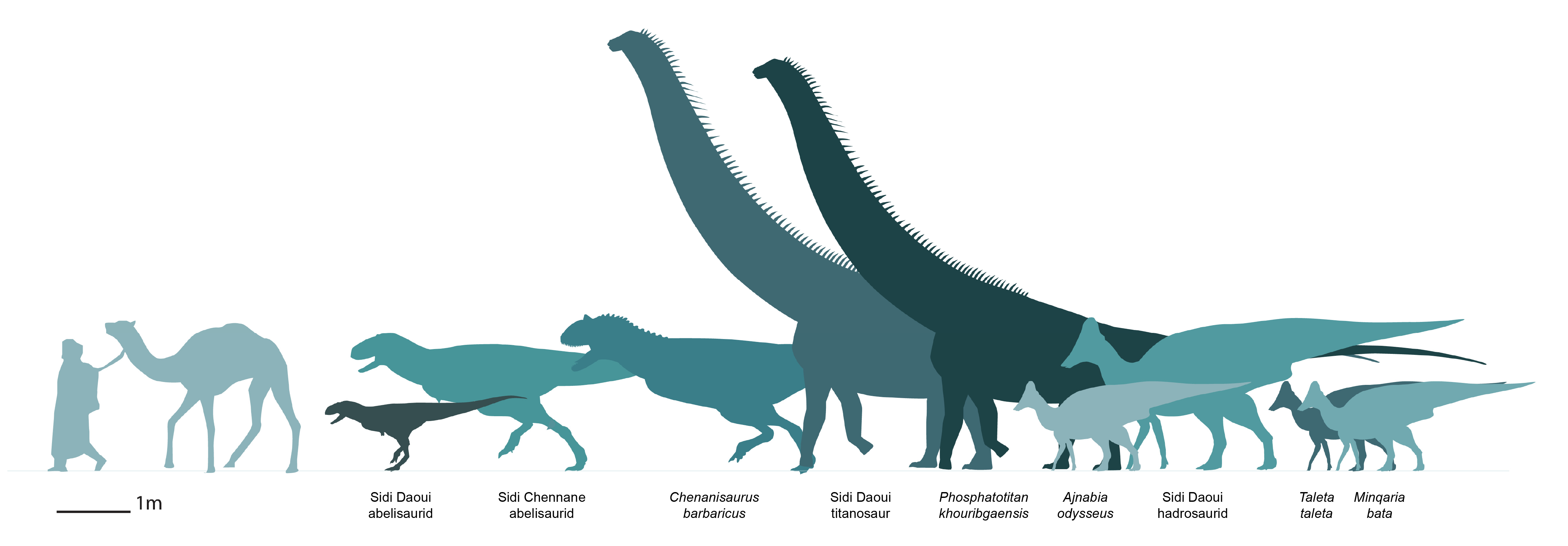
Dinosaurs from the Moroccan Maastrichtian Phosphates including Ajnabia at the right

The holotype specimen, MHNM KHG 222, was recovered from the phosphates of the Ouled Abdoun Basin of north-central Morocco. The phosphates are a nearshore marine environment dominated by sharks, fish, mosasaurs and other marine reptiles. Dinosaurs are rare, however, including the large abelisaurid Chenanisaurus barbaricus, two other potentially distinct abelisaurids of smaller size, and an unnamed titanosaurian. Moroccan lambeosaurine fossils belonging to individuals of various sizes, including the holotypes of Minqaria and Taleta, indicate that hadrosaurs were diverse and abundant within the ecosystem. These dinosaurs would have lived in the very latest Cretaceous (Late Maastrichtian) approximately 1 million years before the K–Pg boundary and the Chicxulub asteroid impact that wiped out the dinosaurs.

=== Palaeobiogeography ===
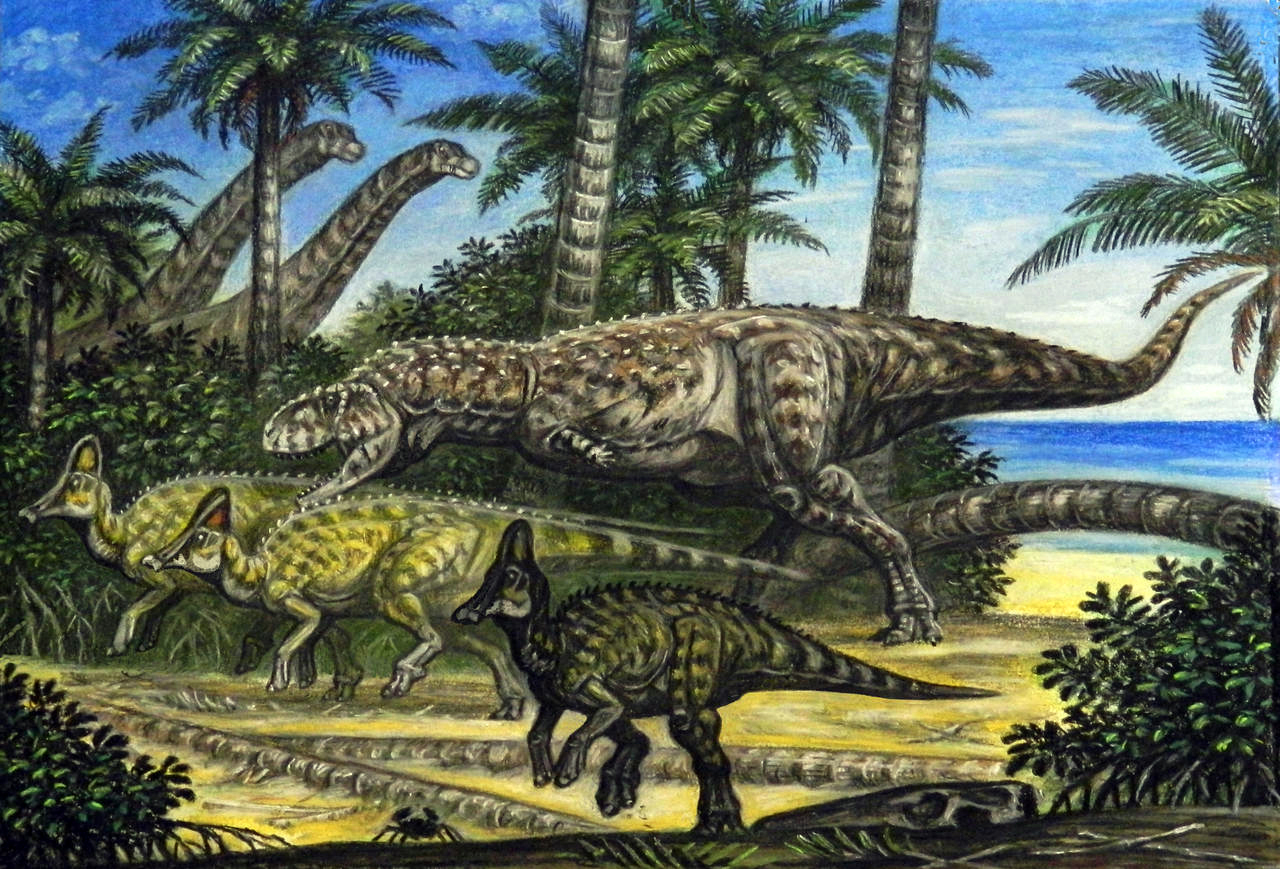
Restoration of Chenanisaurus hunting Ajnabia

Hadrosaurs, the taxonomic group Ajnabia is assigned to, had not been documented from Africa until its discovery; specifically, its close relatives within Lambeosaurinae are all known from Europe. Given this taxonomic position and reconstructions of Late Cretaceous continents and seas, oceanic dispersal between Europe and North Africa is considered the only viable explanation for the presence of Ajnabia in Africa. While oceanic dispersal had previously been considered for the distribution of European hadrosaurs, intermittent land connections as a means of dispersal could not be ruled out. The much more prominent oceanic barrier between Europe and Africa, characterized by deep waters, makes Ajnabia far stronger evidence of this phenomenon, as the gap could be narrowed by varying conditions but not conceivably bridge entirely. The possibility that Ajnabia was a carcass or fossil that had floated from Europe was also considered highly unlikely due to the fossil's taphonomy and the inability to assign it to any known European species. Further evidence for the oceanic dispersal as the model for lambeosaur dispersal also exists from the lack of more complete interchange of fauna between locations, expected from land bridge dispersal. In turn, Ajnabia has been used as an important data point to support the possibility of oceanic dispersal between European islands. Possible means of dispersal include swimming, drifting, or rafting (wherein animals are transported on top of floating debris or vegetation). Rafting is considered unlikely for a large animal, but it's considered possible that young hadrosaurs could be transported in this way.

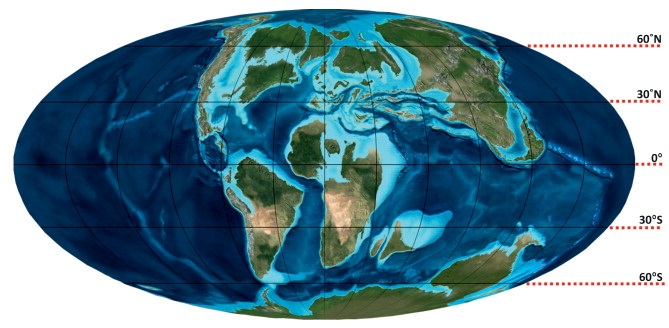
Map of the continents in the Late Cretaceous. The southern "Gondwanan" continents were diverging, and Northern Africa was an island.

More broadly speaking, the Maastrichtian fauna of the North African ecosystem Ajnabia inhabited seems biogeographically linked more to Gondwanan faunas—that is, those of the southern continents—than that of Europe and the other Laurasian continents of the Northern Hemisphere. Whilst Laurasia is characterized by tyrannosaurids, ornithischians and herbivorous coelurosaurs, Gondwana is dominated by titanosaurs and abelisaurs, as seen in Morocco. Despite this, a degree of endemism is noted, similar to that of other Gondwanan continents. A small abelisaur from the Sidi Daoui region is unlike those from South America or India but may be related to North African forms from earlier in the Cretaceous or similarly sized abelisaurs in Europe; likewise, Chenanisaurus may represent a distinct lineage from other known abelisaurs. Inversely, other Gondwanan animals from South America, such as ankylosaurs, unenlagiines, elasmarians and megaraptorids, are not documented in Africa. This endemism is explained by the fragmentation of the former Gondwanan supercontinent into increasingly distant landmasses, leading to the ancestrally linked faunas of different southern continents becoming distinct. Even within the African continent, the presence of a Trans-Saharan seaway connecting the Tethys Ocean of Europe to the Gulf of Guinea may have isolated the fauna of Northern Africa from more southern portions of the continent, such as fossil-bearing sites in Kenya, and Morocco itself may have been an isolated island.
