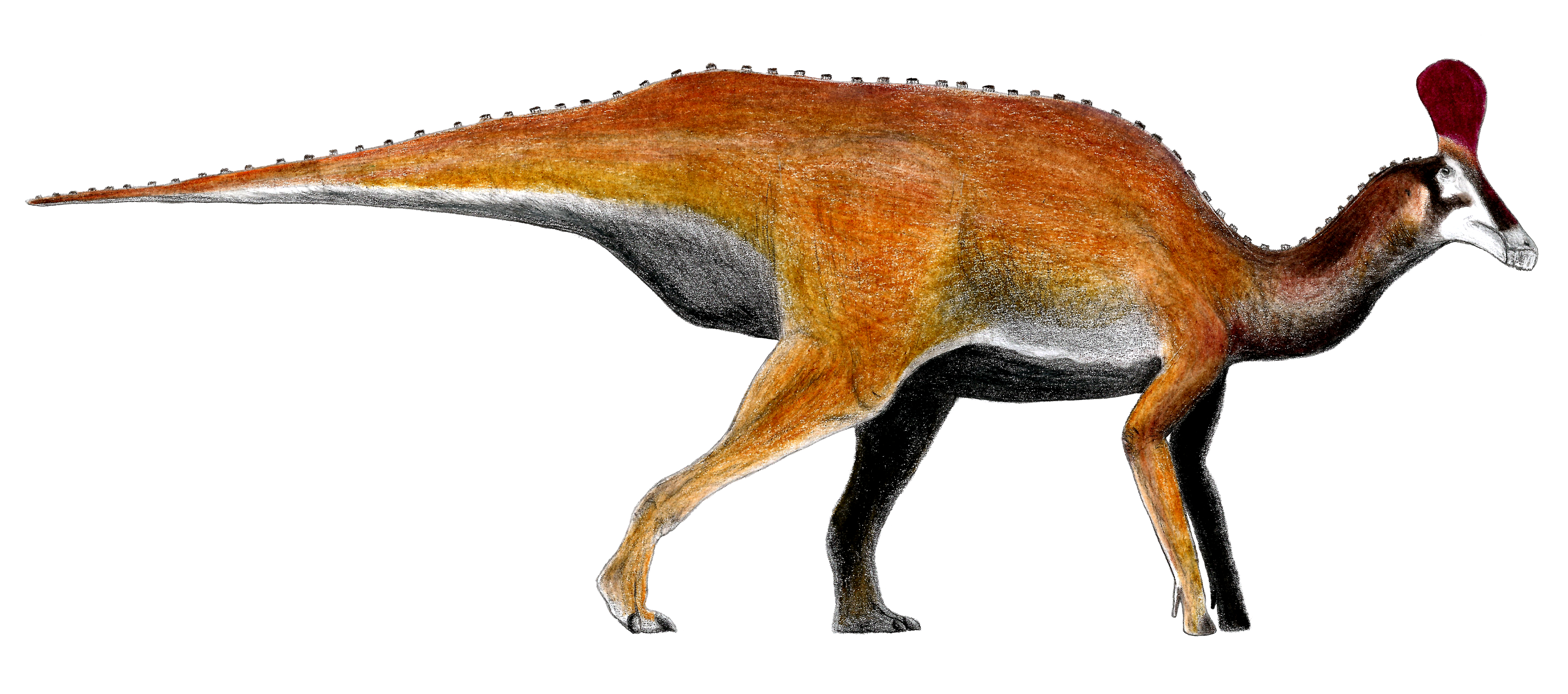
- Life restoration

Scientific classification
- Kingdom: Animalia
- Phylum: Chordata
- Class: Reptilia
- Clade: Dinosauria
- Clade: †Ornithischia
- Clade: †Ornithopoda
- Family: †Hadrosauridae
- Subfamily: †Lambeosaurinae
- Genus: †Adynomosaurus; Prieto-Márquez et al., 2019
- Species: †A. arcanus

Binomial name
- †Adynomosaurus arcanus Prieto-Márquez et al., 2019

= Adynomosaurus =

Adynomosaurus Temporal range: Late Cretaceous (Early Maastrichtian), 70 Ma

Extinct genus of dinosaurs

Adynomosaurus is a genus of lambeosaurine hadrosaurid dinosaur from the Late Cretaceous of what is now Catalonia, Spain. First discovered in 2012, it was named in 2019 with the type and only species being Adynomosaurus arcanus. It is only known from scant material, but is distinguished from other hadrosaurs by its weakly developed shoulder blade which would have had underdeveloped musculature, which lends it its scientific name, partially from the Greek word for "weak". Its exact relationships with other hadrosaurs remain unresolved, with it not consistently being recovered as a relative of any other specific genera, though some studies have allied it with Tsintaosaurini or even found it outside of Hadrosauridae. It would have lived as part of a diverse coastal estuary ecosystem, made up of meandering rivers and mud flats. The discovery of Adynomosaurus adds to the very incomplete fossil record of hadrosaurid dinosaurs in the Late Cretaceous of Europe, and it fits into a picture of major ecological turnover that was occurring during the Maastrichtian stage in the region.

== Discovery and naming ==
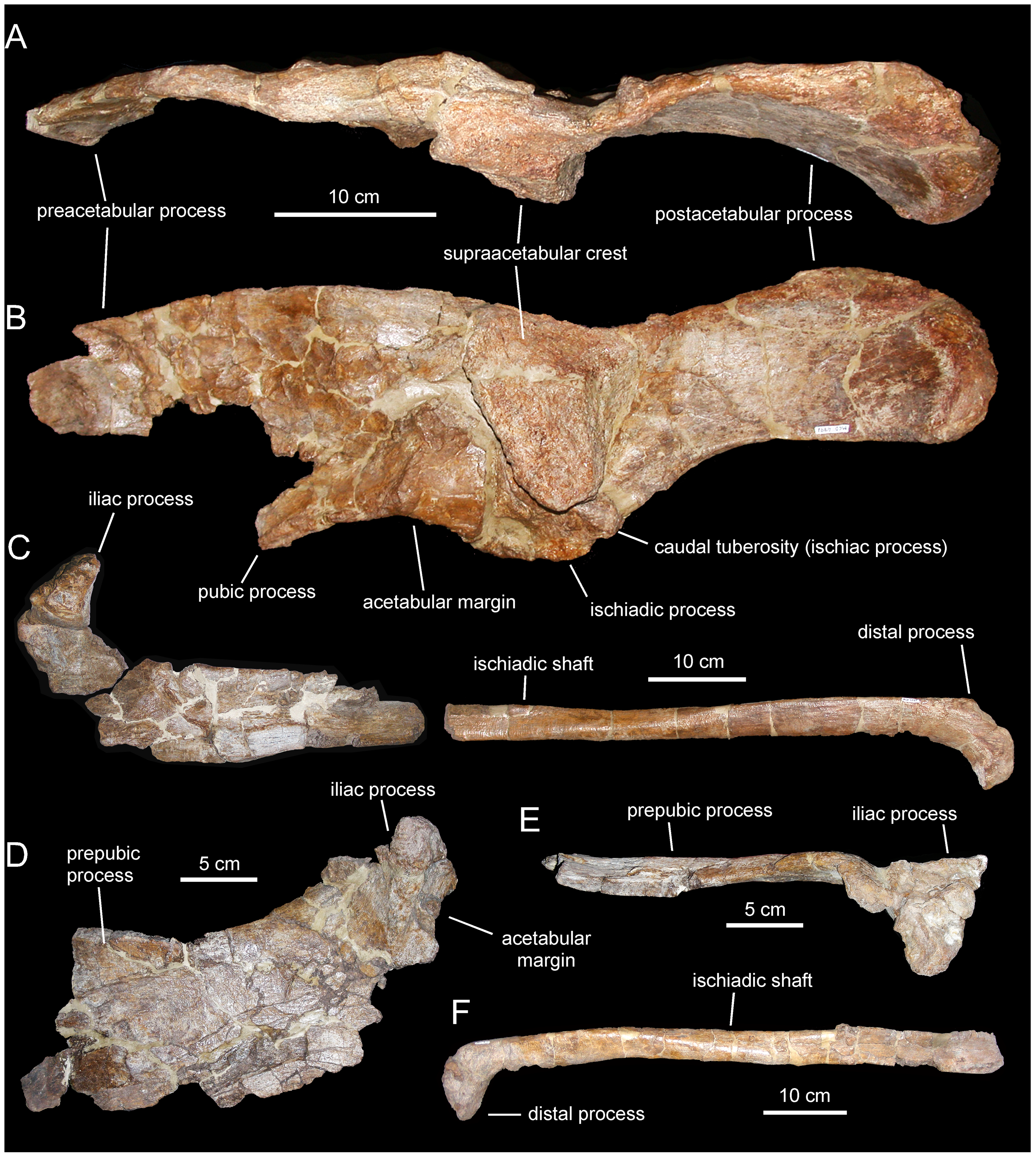
Hadrosaur fossils from Serrat del Corb geologic locality, possibly representing Adynomosaurus

The Costa de les Solanes locality of the Conques Formation was first discovered in 2012, by a wheat field in the village of Basturs in Catalonia; the site dates to the upper layers of the Maastrichtian. Numerous fossil sites preserving dinosaurs from the Maastrichtian are known from across this region of Spain. After being notified of the site by a local, researchers from the Institut Català de Paleontologia Miquel Crusafont and the Universitat Autònoma de Barcelona carried out excavations at the site during 2012 and 2013. The associated but disarticulated remains of a hadrosaur were discovered in this time, including a partial left dentary, a number of partial vertebrae, a left scapula, a left sternum, a partial rib, and numerous pelvic and partial hindlimb bones. Due to the presence of two left tibia, it was concluded the material belonged to at least two different individuals. The specimens are held at the Museu de la Conca Dellà in Lleida, Spain. This would first be reported in an abstract for a presentation at the 78th annual meeting of the Society of Vertebrate Paleontology, with the remains then thought to pertain to a new species of the genus Pararhabdodon.

These remains would be formally named and described by Albert Prieto-Márquez, Víctor Fondevilla, Albert G. Selles, Jonathan R. Wagner and Angel Galobart in the palaeontological journal Cretaceous Research, under the name Adynomosaurus arcanus. The distinctive scapula, with the specimen number MCD 7125, was selected as the holotype specimen for the taxon, due to being the most diagnostic element. The generic name is a composite of the Greek words 'adýnamos' (weak), '-mos' (shoulder) and 'sauros' (lizard), referring to the taxon's shoulder blade being underdeveloped and likely supporting weaker musculature than other hadrosaurs. The specific name arcanus means "secret" or "occult", in reference to the scant and uninformative nature of the hadrosaur fossil record from the South-Central Pyrenean Basin. An indeterminate hadrosaur specimen preserving a very complete pelvic girdle, MCD 4791, was described in 2013 by Albert Prieto-Márquez and colleagues. It hails from the Serrat del Corb locality of the Tremp Formation. The paper describing Adynomosaurus noted multiple similarities shared between the specimen and their new taxon, but due to the lack of outright diagnostic traits from Adynomosaurus and a degree of stratigraphic separation, refrained from referring to the genus.

== Description ==
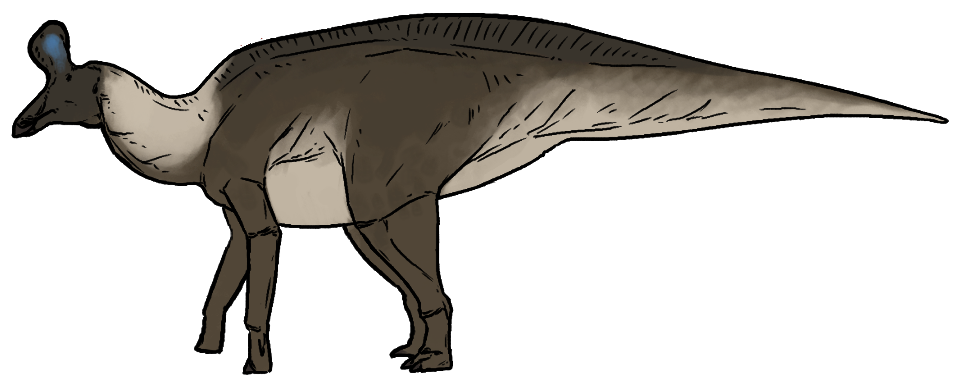
Life restoration

In many respects, such as the vertebrae, humerus, femur, tibia, and metatarsals, the known anatomy of Adynomosaurus is indistinguishable from all other hadrosaurid dinosaurs. As a member of the hadrosaur family, it would have been a quadrupedal animal, while bearing the ability to walk upon its hindlegs bipedally. It would have had a long skull, ending in a beak, and a large array of complex teeth; as a lambeosaur, it would have possessed a cranial crest made of the nasal bones, filled with hollow internal passages. Despite its similarity to other hadrosaurs, some traits distinguish it from its relatives. Compared to other Spanish hadrosaurs, its dental anatomy stands out; the dentary of Koutalisaurus possesses tooth alveoli rotated slightly backwards, whereas in Arenysaurus and Blasisaurus they point upwards. Adynomosaurus possesses teeth intermediate to these conditions, rotated in the front half of the jaw but vertically oriented near the back. The tooth crowns are around three times taller than wide, also differing from the latter pair of genera, which have a more extreme ratio.

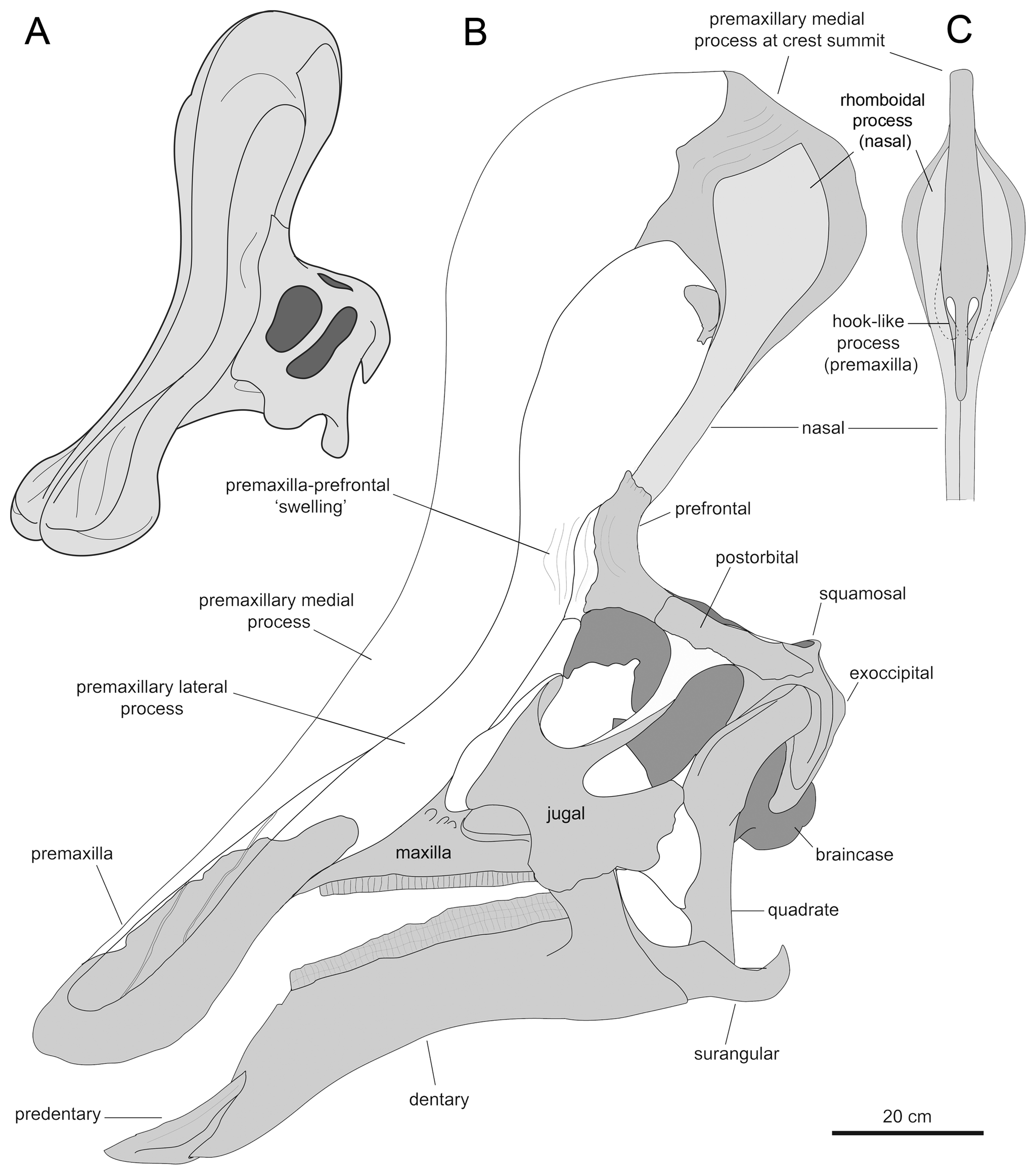
Skull material of possible relative Tsintaosaurus; Adynomosaurus would have had a similar crest

In regards to the anatomy of the postcranium, the supraacetabular crest of the ilium is V-shaped, and is extended very far back, all the way to the connection point with the ischium. Such an extreme extension of the crest is not presented in most lambeosaurines, but can be observed in Parasaurolophus cyrtocristatus as well as the Serrat del Corb hadrosaur. Also shared with these two taxa are features of the iliac process of the ischium; its dorsal and ventral (i.e. top and bottom) margins are nearly parallel and it is stout, with a broad articulate facet. The most distinctive part of its anatomy is its scapula, or shoulder bone, which bears the only traits unique to it among hadrosaurs. Specifically, the scapula is generally underdeveloped; its length, proportionally, seems to be the shortest of all hadrosaurs, though this is unable to be definitively confirmed due to incompleteness of the bone amongst known specimens. More definitively, the scapular blade (the flattened end) is only 75% the width of the proximal end (base) of the bone, unlike in all other lambeosaurines where it is as wide or wider. Likewise, the proximal constriction of the scapula - the middle portion connecting the proximal end to the blade - is very thin, hardly half as deep at the proximal end and around eighty percent the depth of the deepest section of the blade. The deltoid ridge of the bone is heavily reduced. These aspects of scapular anatomy are known to not be variable with age in other hadrosaurs, ruling out that as an expalantion of the condition in Adynomosaurus. The scapulae of Pararhabdodon and the Basturs Poble hadrosaur, from similar times and places, display more conventional anatomy, distinct from that of Adynomosaurus.

Based on the myology of modern crocodylians, it is surmised that the reduction of the scapulae in Adynomosaurus would have likewise meant reduction of the associated arm musculature. Thus the strength of abduction, reduction, and adduction of the humerus may have been lesser than other hadrosaurs. This cannot be known for certain, however, as it is possible the musculature size did not correlate with the size of the bone as might be expected.

== Classification ==
Adynomosaurus was described as a member of the hadrosaur subfamily Lambeosaurinae, but its relationships were not able to be determined more specifically; in a phylogenetic analysis it emerged in a soft polytomy alongside the genera Aralosaurus, Canardia, Jaxartosaurus, Tsintaosaurus, and Pararhabdodon as the base of the family. Some studies have since found it to be outside of Lambeosaurinae, instead being a non-hadrosaurid hadrosauroid closely related to Nanningosaurus. Others, however, have maintained the lambeosaurine position. One such study found it to be within a clade therein named Arenysaurini, alongside other European taxa and the moroccan genus Ajnabia. Another study instead found it to be related to Tsintaosaurus and Pararhabdodon within Tsintaosaurini, with some other European taxa being more derived. The resulting tree of the former study is seen on the left, while the tree of the latter is seen on the right:

- Lambeosaurinae
  - Aralosaurus
  - - Jaxartosaurus
    - - Nipponosaurus
      - - Tsintaosaurus
        - - Arenysaurini
            - - Arenysaurus
              - Pararhabdodon
            - - Koutalisaurus
              - - - Basturs lambeosaurine
                  - Canardia
                - - Adynomosaurus
                  - - Serrat del Rostiar lambeosaurine
                    - - Blasisaurus
                      - Ajnabia
          - - Parasaurolophini
            - Lambeosaurini

- Hadrosauridae
  - Hadrosaurus
  - - Nanyangosaurus
    - - Eotrachodon
      - - Aquilarhinus
        - - Yamatosaurus
          - Euhadrosauria
            - Saurolophinae
            - Lambeosaurinae
              - Aralosaurus
              - - Tsintaosaurini
                  - Adynomosaurus
                  - - Tsintaosaurus
                    - - Pararhabdodon
                      - Ajnabia
                - - Jaxartosaurus
                  - - Canardia
                    - Corythosauria

== Palaeoenvironment ==
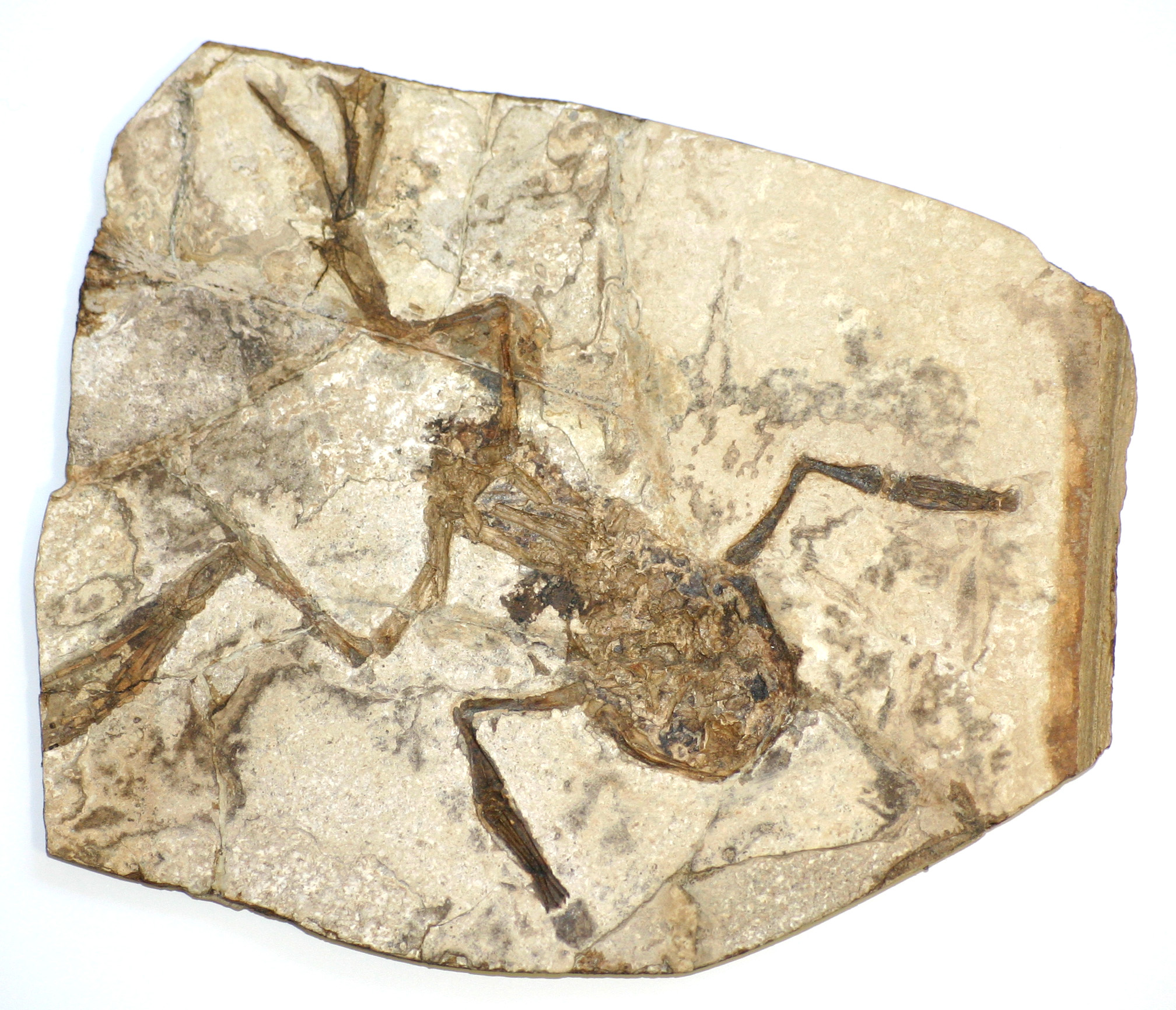
Fossils indicate a diverse fauna of reptiles and amphibians lived alongside Adynomosaurus, such as this palaeobatrachid frog

Adynomosaurus is known from the Conques Formation of the Tremp Group, which, in the Cretaceous, was part of the Ibero-Armorican island, the largest of several islands that Europe was divided into at that time. The distinct Basturs Poble lambeosaur as well as the Serrat del Rostiar tsintaosaurin hadrosaur are known from equivalent geological units. It is well documented that a major change in the faunal composition of Late Cretaceous Europe occurred around the start of the Maastrichtian age, known as the "Maastrichtian Dinosaur Turnover". This saw the previously established dinosaurian herbivore fauna, composed of titanosaurs, rhabdodontids, and nodosaurids, go extinct in South-Western Europe and be replaced with different types of titanosaur as well lambeosaurine hadrosaurs, the latter of which go on to become overwhelmingly dominant across the region. Whether this was due directly to competition with lambeosaurs (which only arrive in Europe around the time of the turnover) or due to environmental changes that merely left a void for hadrosaurs is unknown. Despite the completeness of the change, there was a brief period of time wherein the pre- and post-turnover faunas coexist. The Conques Formation ecosystem is one such example, being one of only two known occurrences of a rhabdodont, specifically Pareisactus, coexisting with hadrosaurs. Contrastingly, the enormous Abditosaurus, also from the formation, is considered characteristic of post-turnover titanosaur faunas. Fossils from temporally equivalent rocks of the Ibero-Armorican island include those tentatively referred to the theropods Arcovenator, Richardoestesia, Pyroraptor, intermediate remains referred to nodosaurid dinosaurs, indeterminate material from iguanid, anguid, Gekkota, and scincomorph lizards, indeterminate material from albanerpetontid amphibians, alytid and palaeobatrachid frogs, the bothremydid turtle Polysternon, and material tentatively referred to the crocodylomorph genera Allodaposuchus, Acynodon, Doratodon, and Sabresuchus.

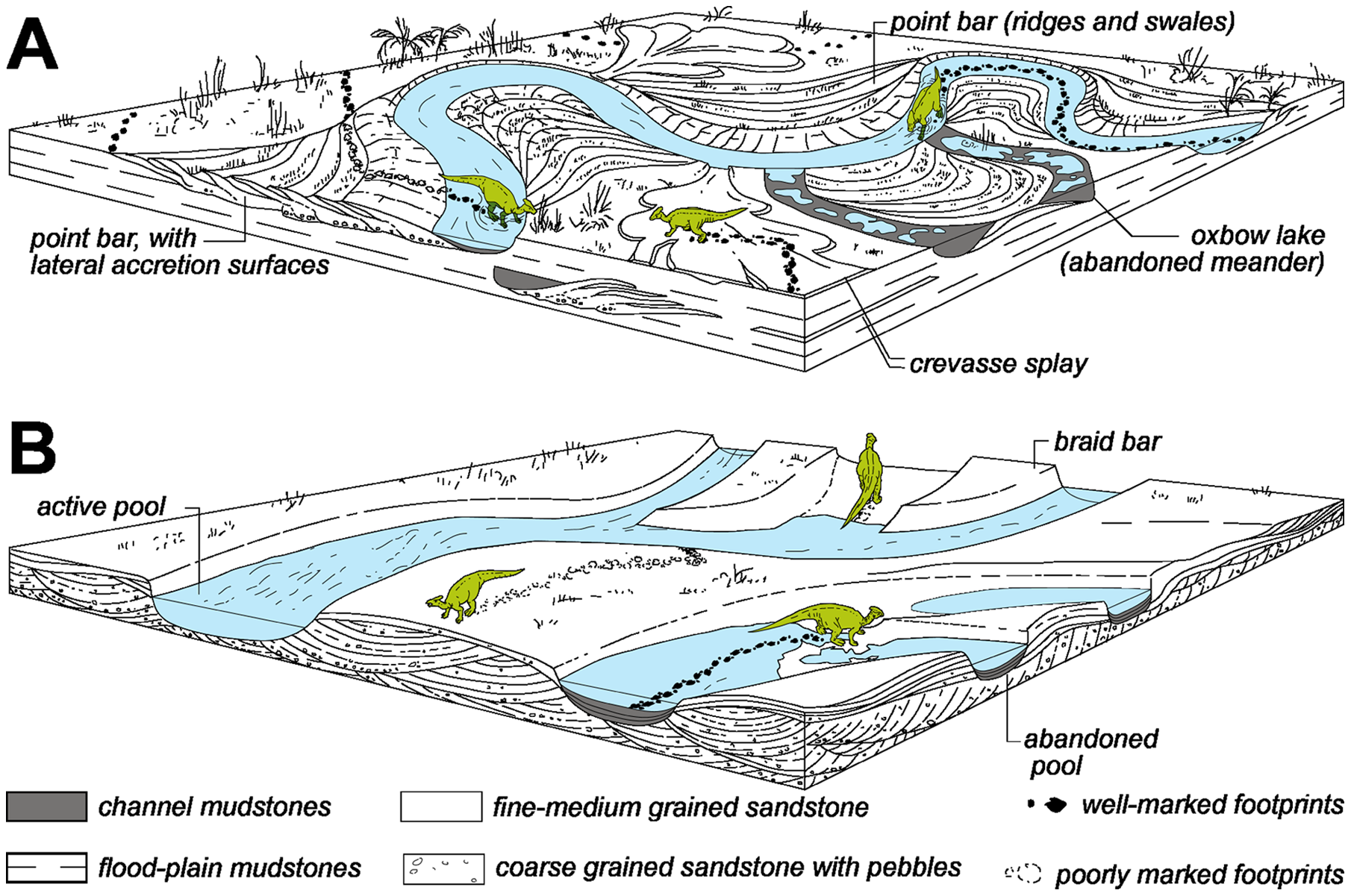
Diagram of hadrosaur track depositional conditions, demonstrating the mudstone floodplains of meandering rivers (above) and braided rivers (below) hadrosaurs like Adynomosaurus lived in

The environment of the lower red mudstone unit (including the Conques Formation) of the Tremp Group has traditionally been considered fluvial floodplains. Sedimentary data associated with hadrosaur tracks preserved from the Tremp Group have been used to corroborate this. The ecosystem would have included abundant meandering rivers, with beds of either fine-grain or less often sand, as well as less common braided rivers, bedded with gravel. These rivers would have been interspersed across floodplains, possibly contiguous with estuarine conditions due to the proximity to marine environments (of the Tethys sea). The abundance of mudstone, as well as other mineral and sediment features, indicates cyclic flooding and frequently fluctuating water levels in the ecosystem, which allowed the dinosaurs to leave tracks in the exposed wet mud which were then swiftly covered with water again to allow for preservation. In addition to the floodplains themselves, plant life would have colonized the abandoned rivers meanders and braid bars. Carbon and oxygen isotope values from dinosaur eggshells also provided evidence of a wet environment, and found a mean air temperature for the ecosystem of 21 °C (70 °F). A 2014 study proposed that the unit may have been more extensively marine-influenced than traditionally thought, something geologist Herbert Eisenscheer had previously proposed in a 1980s PhD thesis. In addition to sediment data, microfossils were investigated as an important source of evidence. Marine red algae and echinoderms among other marine microfossils were found to have been deposited into the river and mudflat environment. This was reasoned to have happened by tidal influences, transported along water channels after death; in some modern environments tidal forces influences rivers and transports material as much as 80 km inland. Sandy tidal flats may have been present, transitioning gradually into the mud sediments beyond the reach of high tide. Thus the formation has been considered to represent a tide-dominated delta alongside contiguous inland tidal-influenced meandering river channels, acting as a transitional ecosystem between fully freshwater and fully marine environments.

== See also ==
- Timeline of hadrosaur research
