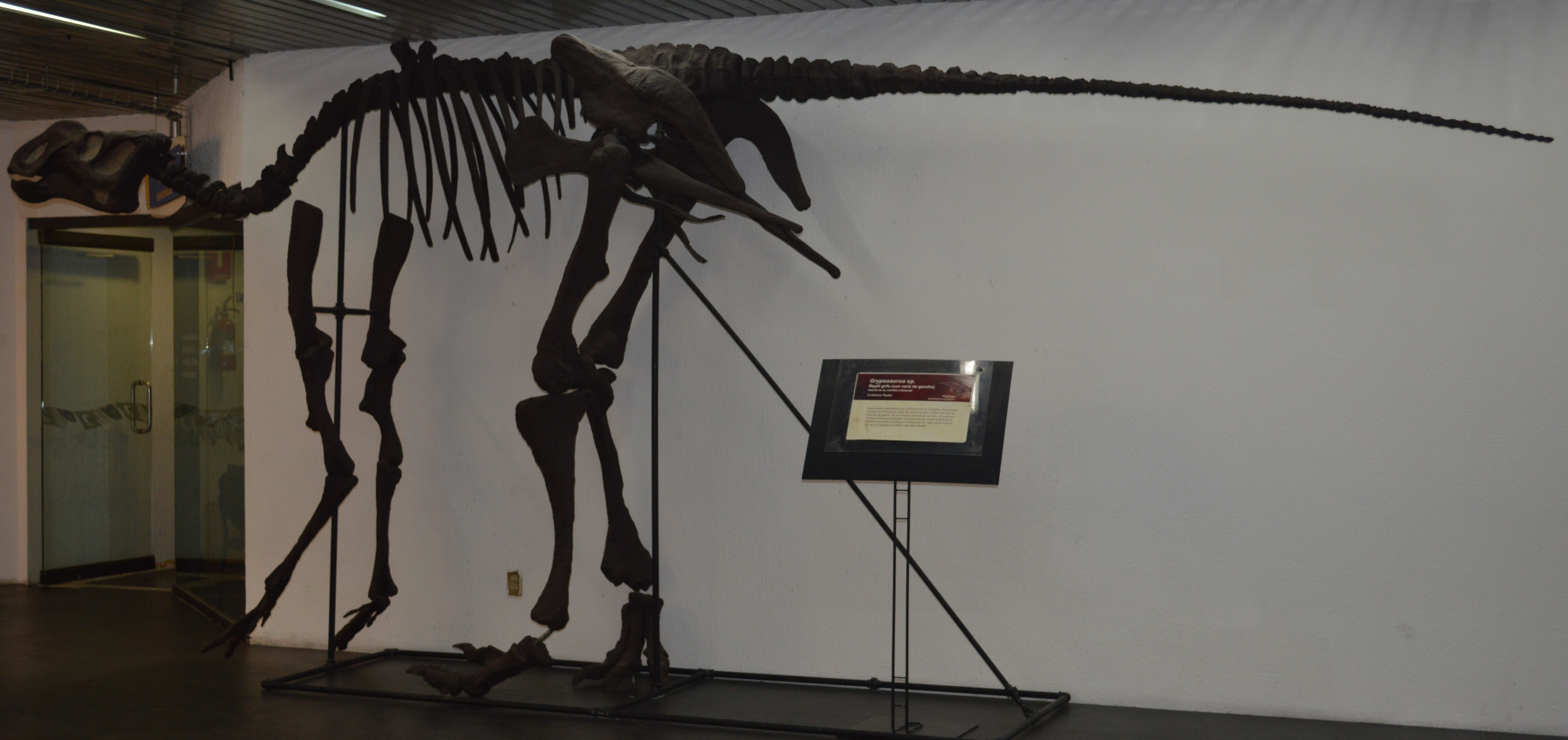
- Reconstructed skeleton, Universum (UNAM)

Scientific classification
- Kingdom: Animalia
- Phylum: Chordata
- Class: Reptilia
- Clade: Dinosauria
- Clade: †Ornithischia
- Clade: †Ornithopoda
- Family: †Hadrosauridae
- Subfamily: †Lambeosaurinae
- Genus: †Latirhinus; Prieto-Márquez and Serrano-Brañas, 2012

Type species
- †Latirhinus uitstlani Prieto-Márquez and Serrano-Brañas, 2012

= Latirhinus =

Latirhinus Temporal range: Late Cretaceous, 72.5 Ma

Extinct genus of reptiles

Latirhinus (meaning "broad nose" from the Latin latus (broad) and Greek ῥίς, rhis (nose)) is an extinct genus of lambeosaurine hadrosaurid dinosaur from the Late Cretaceous of Mexico. The type species, Latirhinus uitstlani, was named in 2012 on the basis of a partial skeleton from the Campanian-age Cerro del Pueblo Formation. The specific name uitstlani means "southern" in the Náhuatl language of Mexico, a reference to the species' southern occurrence in the Cretaceous landmass Laramidia.

== Discovery and research ==
During the 1980s, a team from UNAM's Geological Institute, including Shelton P. Applegate, René Hernández-Rivera, Espinosa-Arrubarrena, the SEPC team, and some volunteers, excavated the remains of a dinosaur near the town of Presa de San Antonio, belonging to the Cerro del Pueblo Formation in the Parras Basin, located in Coahuila, Mexico. The specimen was found by Don Ramón López, which was a juvenile specimen of 6 meters long, 2.2 height at the waist, and an estimated weight of 3 tons, of which 65% was recovered. This was the first dinosaur skeleton from Mexico to be mounted for public display. This specimen, though fairly complete, lacked a skull, but was identified as the saurolophine Kritosaurus sp. based on comparisons with Kritosaurus incurvimanus, which is now considered a more recent synonym of Gryposaurus notabilis. Due to its importance, the skeleton was given the informal name of "Isauria", and it is exhibited in the Museum of the Institute of Geology of the UNAM, Universum, Museo Papalote in the State of Hidalgo, Museo del Desierto, and several private parks. Serrano-Brañas, in 2006, identified one of the bones collected as a supposed nasal, and together with the appendicular skeleton, he referred to the genus Gryposaurus in his thesis.

== Description ==
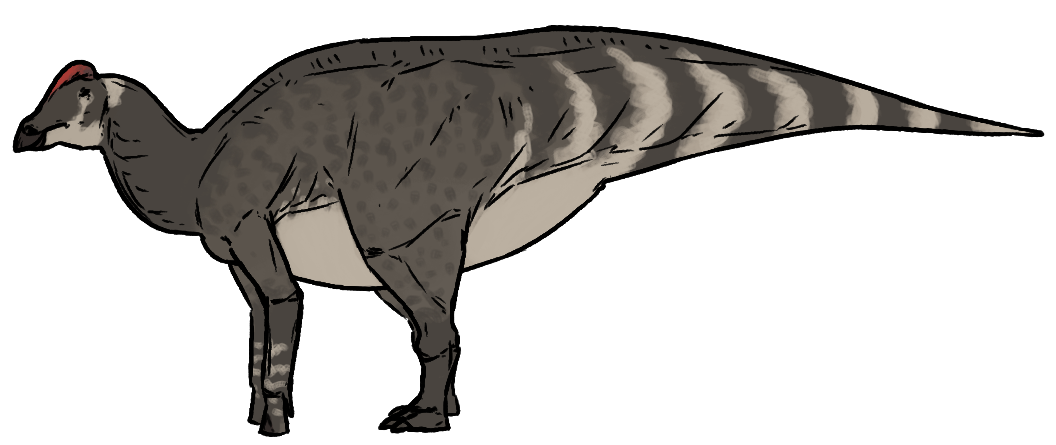
Life restoration

Latirhinus was a medium-sized hadrosaur, measuring 8.7 metres (29 ft) long and weighing around 3.75 metric tons (4.13 short tons). The holotype specimen, IGM 6583, consists of a partial skeleton including a partial right nasal, 10 dorsal and 14 caudal vertebrae, the right coracoid, left scapula, both humeri and ulna, right III and IV metacarpals, periacetabular process of Right ilium, iliac peduncle of the right ischium, both femurs, tibiae, and fibulae, left talus, right and left metatarsals III and IV, and several proximal phalanges of the right foot.

== Classification ==
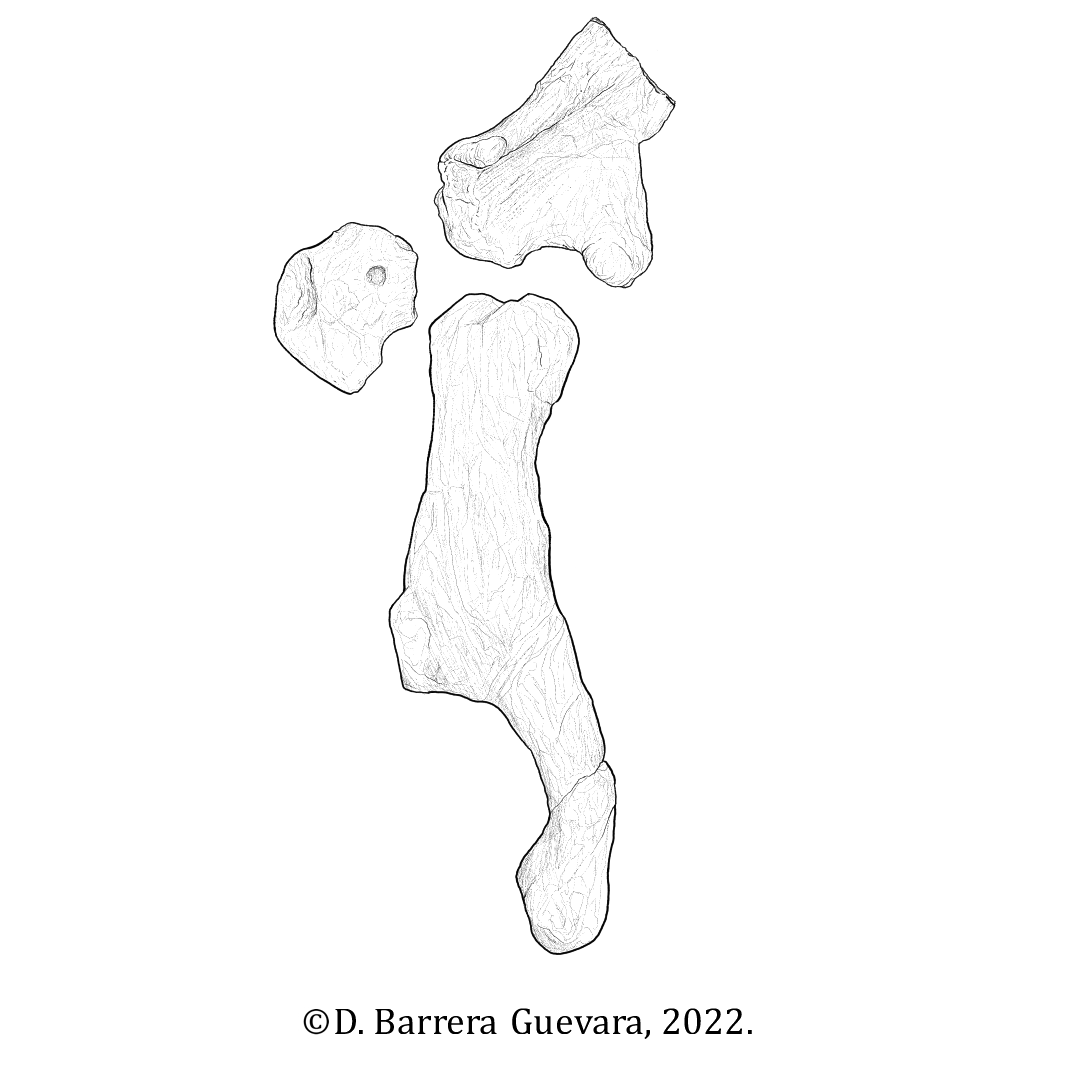
Pectoral elements

Latirhinus was originally thought to be similar to the saurolophine Gryposaurus. However, a 2012 study found its holotype, as originally defined, to be a chimera comprising both lambeosaurine and saurolophine remains; the holotype bones would've belonged to a lambeosaurine. While this position has been accepted by other researchers, there are still disagreements over where Latirhinus falls within Lambeosaurinae. The first cladogram shows Latirhinus as a basal lambeosaurine, while the second shows an alternate position as a derived member of Lambeosaurini.

- Lambeosaurinae
  - Jaxartosaurus
  - Aralosaurus
  - Latirhinus
  - - Ajnabia
    - - Adynomosaurus
      - - Pararhabdodon
        - Tsintaosaurus
  - - - Arenysaurus
      - Blasisaurus
      - Canardia
    - - Parasaurolophini
        - Tlatolophus
        - Charonosaurus
        - Parasaurolophus
      - Lambeosaurini

- Lambeosaurini
  - - Amurosaurus
    - Sahaliyania
  - - Velafrons
    - - Latirhinus
      - - Magnapaulia
        - - - Hypacrosaurus stebingeri
            - - Corythosaurus spp.
              - Lambeosaurus spp.
          - - Angulomastacator
            - Hypacrosaurus altispinus
            - Olorotitan
            - - Arenysaurus
              - Blasisaurus

== See also ==
- Timeline of hadrosaur research
