= Coahuilasaurus =

Coahuilasaurus Temporal range: Late Cretaceous (Campanian), 72.5 Ma
- Holotype photographs and line drawings

Scientific classification
- Kingdom: Animalia
- Phylum: Chordata
- Class: Reptilia
- Clade: Dinosauria
- Clade: †Ornithischia
- Clade: †Ornithopoda
- Family: †Hadrosauridae
- Subfamily: †Saurolophinae
- Tribe: †Kritosaurini
- Genus: †Coahuilasaurus; Longrich et al., 2024

Type species
- †Coahuilasaurus lipani Longrich et al., 2024

Extinct genus of ornithopod dinosaurs

Coahuilasaurus (meaning "Coahuila lizard") is an extinct genus of kritosaurin ornithopod dinosaur from the Late Cretaceous (Campanian) Cerro del Pueblo Formation of Coahuila, Mexico. The genus contains a single species, C. lipani, known from the associated tips of the upper and lower jaw and other fragmentary skull bones. It is a large kritosaurin with an estimated body length of 8–9 metres (26–30 ft) and body mass of over 4 metric tons (4.4 short tons).

== Discovery and naming ==
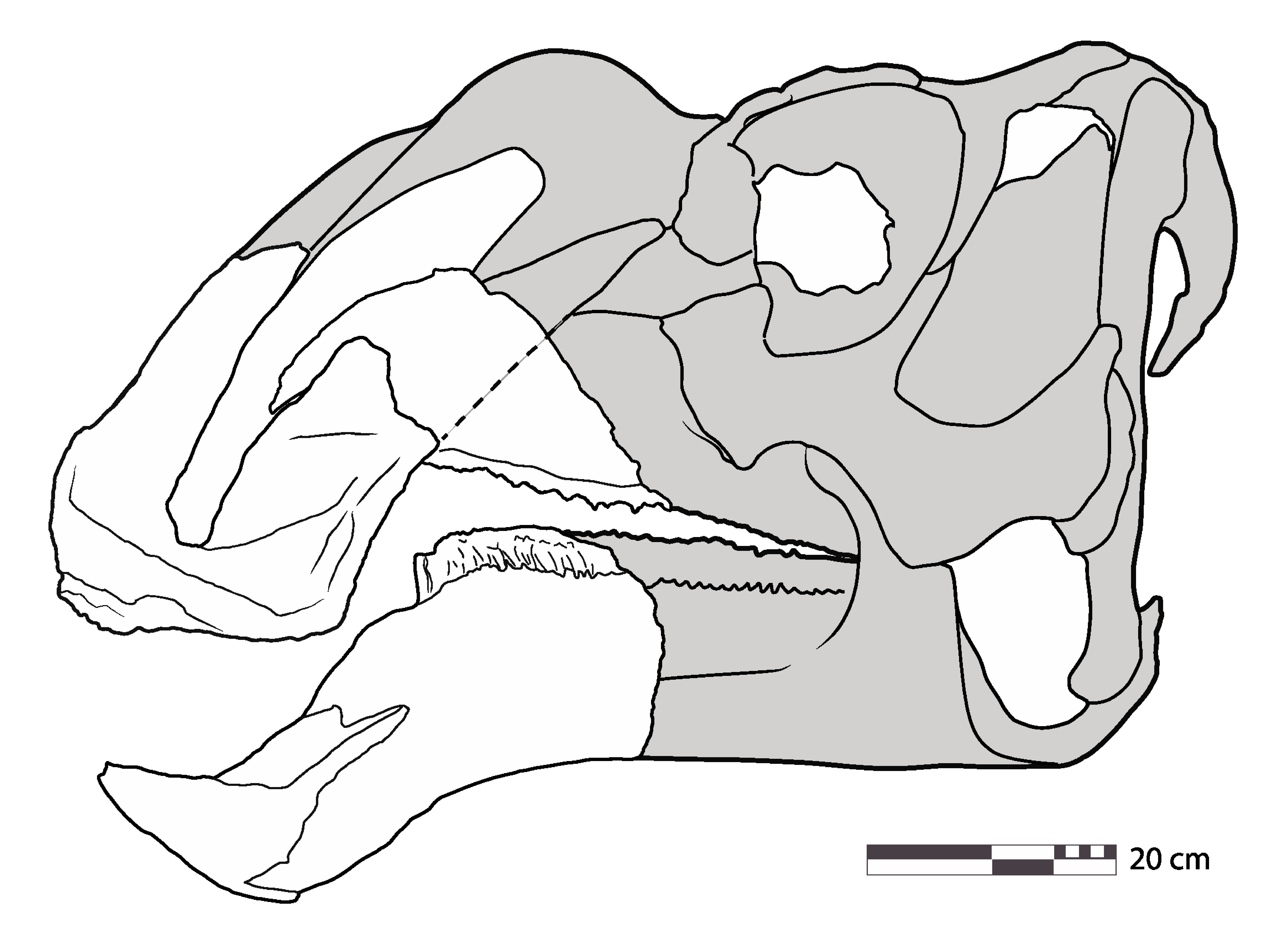
Reconstructed skull

The holotype specimen, IGM 6685, is a partial skull. It was originally thought to belong to the same genus as PASAC 1, a large unnamed specimen known as the "Sabinas hadrosaurid", but this referral was later rejected. IGM 6685 was later referred to as a specimen of Kritosaurus.

IGM 6685 was later named as a new genus and species of kritosaurin hadrosaurid in 2024. The generic name, Coahuilasaurus, honors the Mexican state of Coahuila, where the fossils were found. The specific name, lipani, honors the Lépai-Ndé or Lipani, a tribe of Apache Native Americans known from the area.

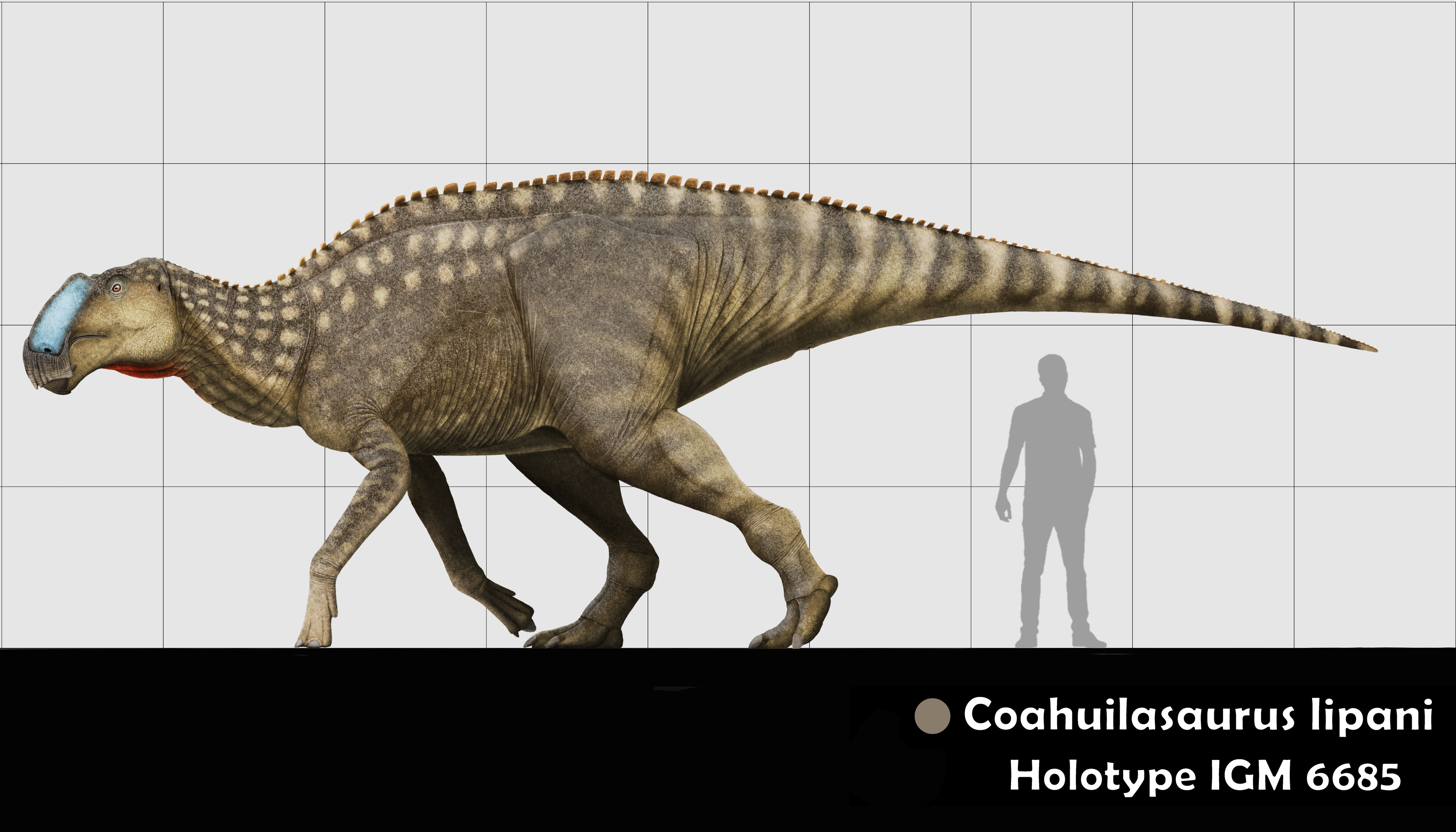
Life restoration and size comparison.

== Classification ==
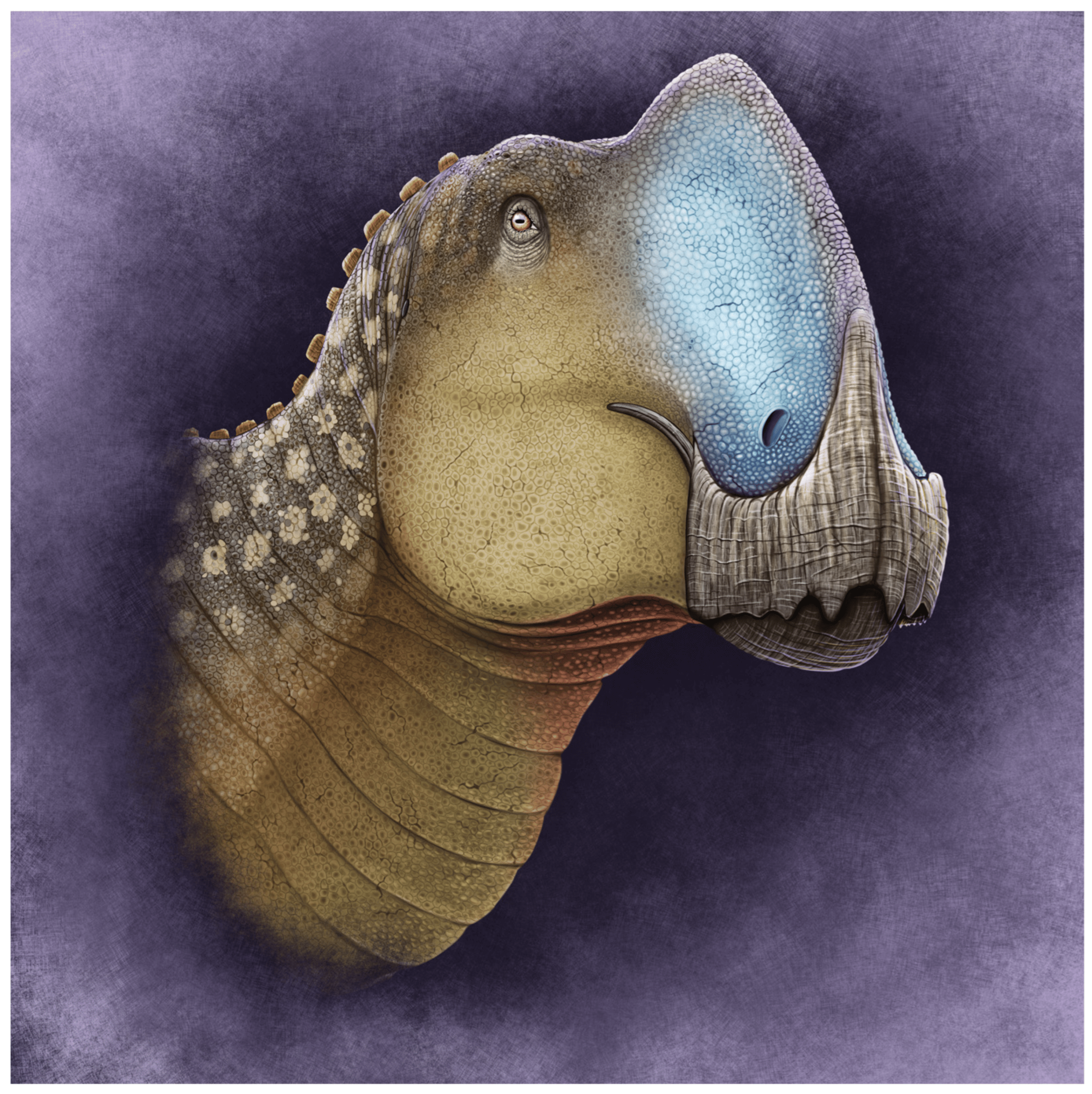
Life restoration

Longrich et al. added Coahuilasaurus to a phylogenetic analysis which found it to be a member of the Kritosaurini, while the Sabinas hadrosaur was found to be a member of Saurolophini. A cladogram adapted from that analysis is shown below:

- Saurolophinae
  - Wulagasaurus dongi
  - - Brachylophosaurini
    - - - Saurolophini
        - Edmontosaurini
      - Kritosaurini
        - Gryposaurus latidens
        - - - Naashoibitosaurus ostromi
            - - Anasazisaurus horneri
              - Kritosaurus navajovius
          - - - Gryposaurus alsatei
              - Austrokritosauria
            - - Gryposaurus notabilis
              - - Coahuilasaurus lipani
                - - Gryposaurus monumentensis
                  - Rhinorex condrupus

== Paleoenvironment ==
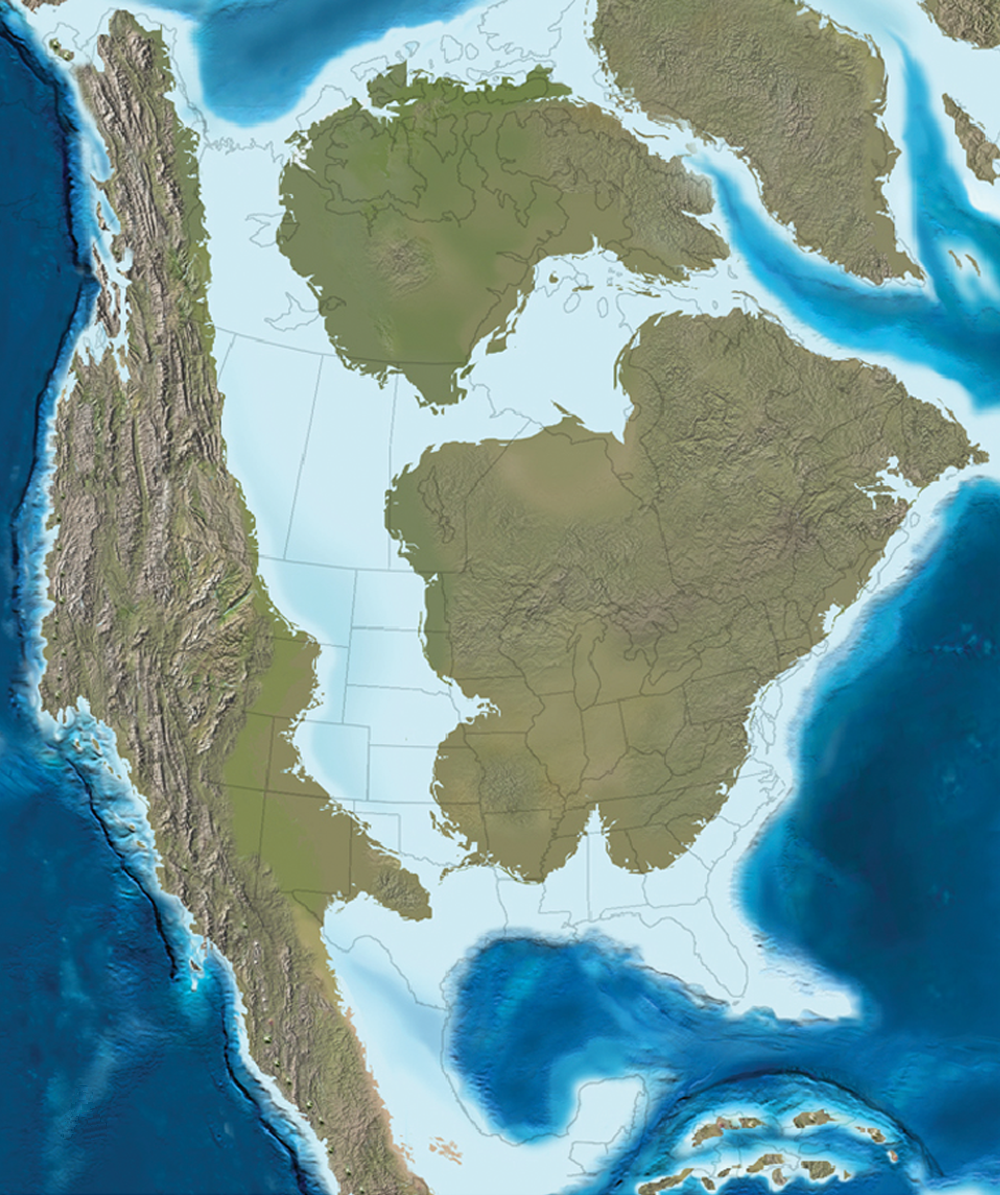
A reconstruction of North America during the Campanian

The Cerro del Pueblo Formation is the oldest member of the Difunta Group, which is believed to have been deposited in the Campanian. It is primarily made up of alternating layers of siltstones, sandstones, and gray shales. These rocks preserve fluvial, lacustrine, coastal, and shallow marine ecosystems. The shale layers primarily preserve marine invertebrates such as ammonites and gastropods and they interbedded with sandstone and siltstone layers, suggesting that sea levels were fluctuating over the time that the formation was deposited. The terrestrial deposits, in which the contemporary ornithomimosaur Paraxenisaurus was found, are believed to represent a coastal floodplain on the margin of an estuary. The presence of a diverse array of crocodiles, turtles, and freshwater bivalves suggests a heavily vegetated riverine ecosystem. The abundance of dinosaur teeth and bone fragments also suggests that the region was replete with vegetation and supported a diverse assemblage of megafauna.

=== Contemporary fauna ===
Dinosaur remains are abundant in the Cerro del Pueblo Formation, but most of the known remains are very incomplete. Many of these dinosaurs are known only from teeth, and are therefore very difficult to assign to any specific genera. Teeth from theropods are very common and have shown that tyrannosaurids, dromaeosaurids, troodontids, and caenagnathids lived in this environment in addition to the above-mentioned ornithomimosaurs.

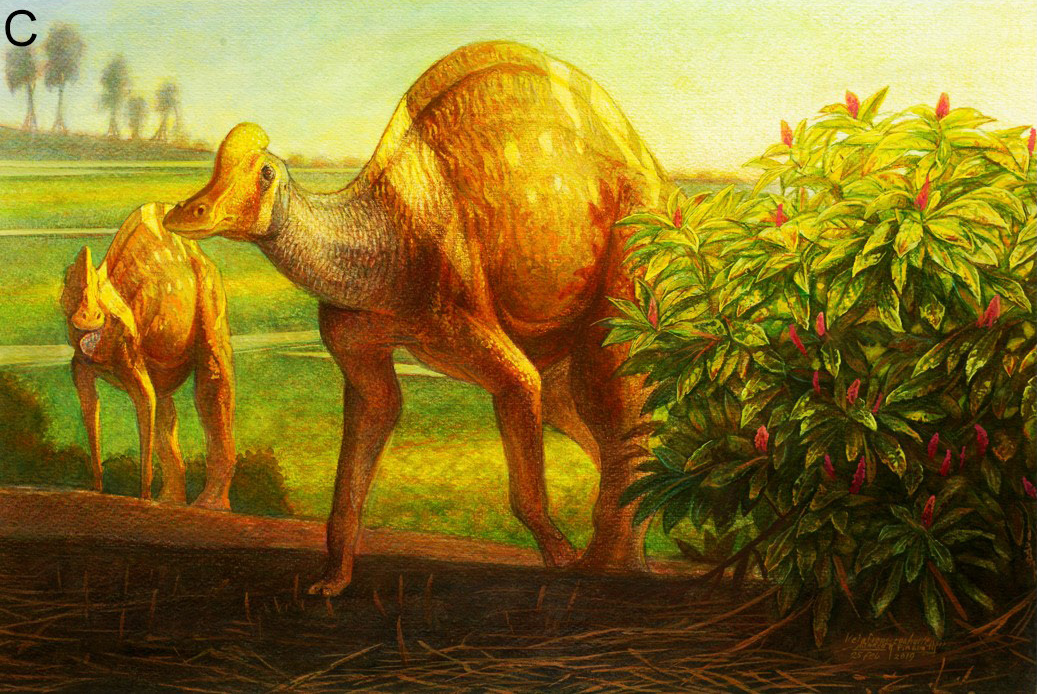
A reconstruction of Velafrons in the environment of the Cerro del Pueblo Formation

Ornithischians were also common and diverse in the ecosystem, much like the contemporaneous Dinosaur Park, Two Medicine, Kaiparowits, and Kirtland formations. Hadrosaur remains are the most common dinosaur fossil material found in the Cerro del Pueblo, being known from vertebrae, limb bones, jawbones, teeth, and shoulder bones. Some of these taxa have been named and described, such as Tlatolophus, Velafrons, and Latirhinus, but most remains have yet to be formally named or described, and additional species may have existed. Ankylosaurs are represented by several unnamed taxa, and ceratopsids like Coahuilaceratops are known to have coexisted with both chasmosaurines and centrosaurines. Fossilized footprints from some kind of pterosaur are also known from this formation.

Like most fluvial sediments from the Campanian of Laramidia, the Cerro del Pueblo Formation was home to a wide array of turtles including pleurodires, paracryptodires, cheloniids, kinosternids, and trionychids. These would have coexisted with both goniopholids and eusuchian crocodyliformes in both freshwater and saltwater environments. There is also some evidence of snakes from this environment. Microfossils have also preserved gastropods, ammonites, bivalves, and other invertebrates.

== See also ==
- Timeline of hadrosaur research
- 2024 in archosaur paleontology
