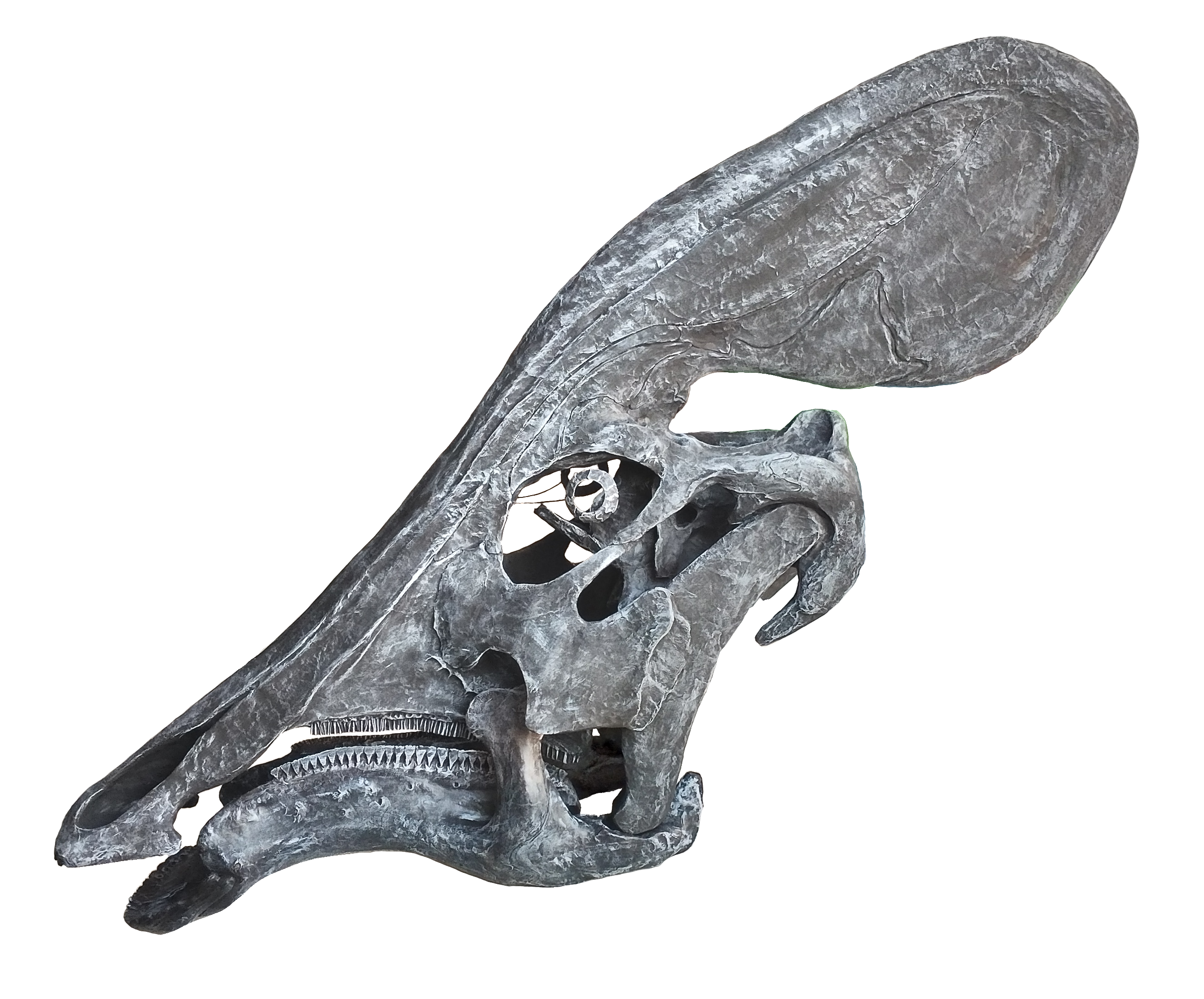
- Skull reconstruction.

Scientific classification
- Kingdom: Animalia
- Phylum: Chordata
- Class: Reptilia
- Clade: Dinosauria
- Clade: †Ornithischia
- Clade: †Ornithopoda
- Family: †Hadrosauridae
- Subfamily: †Lambeosaurinae
- Tribe: †Parasaurolophini
- Genus: †Tlatolophus; Ramírez-Velasco et al., 2021
- Species: †T. galorum

Binomial name
- †Tlatolophus galorum Ramírez-Velasco et al., 2021

= Tlatolophus =

Tlatolophus Temporal range: Late Cretaceous, Campanian 73–72.5 Ma

Genus of hadrosaurid dinosaur

Tlatolophus (meaning "word crest") is a genus of hadrosaurid dinosaur belonging to the tribe Parasaurolophini that lived during the Campanian stage of the Late Cretaceous in what is now Mexico. The only species is the type species, Tlatolophus galorum.

== Discovery and naming ==
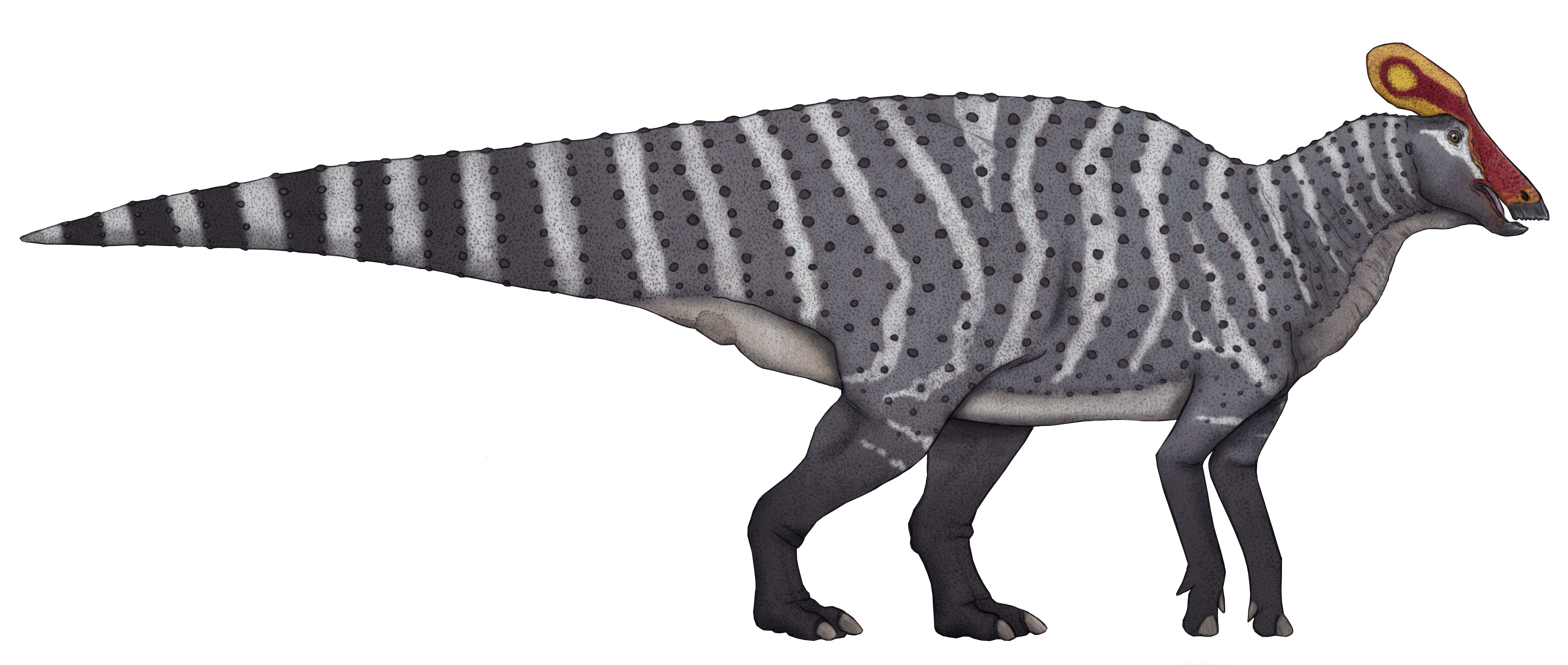
Speculative life restoration.

The holotype, specimen CIC/P/147, was first discovered as a semi-articulated tail in 2005 in sediments of the Cerro del Pueblo Formation in Coahuila, Mexico. In 2013, the Mexican National Institute of Anthropology and History and the National Autonomous University of Mexico launched a joint project to recover it. The holotype represents most complete lambeosaurine known from Mexico with an almost complete skull, jaws, and additional parts of the postcranial skeleton including an articulated tail.

It was named as the new genus and species Tlatolophus galorum in 2021. The generic name comes from the Náhuatl word tlatolli, meaning "word", combined with Greek lophos ("crest") due to the crest's resemblance to the glyph "word" in Aztec iconography, resembling an inverse comma. The species is named after the Garza and López families for their collaboration in collecting and preserving the specimen.

== Description ==
Size compared to a human

The holotype specimen of Tlatolophus, CIC/P/147, represents a large individual, around 8 metres (26 ft) in length and weighing nearly 3 metric tons (3.3 short tons). It preserves an almost complete skull, complete with lower jaws. CIC/P/147 only lacks the surangular and quadrate bones. Tlatolophus's skull is relatively tall. Its premaxilla contacts the nasal, but only along the nasal process. The jugal orbital margins are wider than the infratemporal margin. The frontal platform is present, being dorsocaudally extended and overhanging the parietals. The nasal cavity occupies the structure's entirety, including the caudal end of the supracranial crest which is comma-shaped, hence the binomial name. The pterygoid bone possesses a high and convex dorsal crest.

CIC/P/147 also preserves partial postcranial elements. The scapular neck is relatively stout, and the iliac postacetabular process is long. The ischium possesses a large ischial foot, and its tip is cranioventrally projected. A partial, articulated tail is also preserved, the first remains to be discovered of this taxon.

== Classification ==
Tlatolophus was assigned to the tribe Parasaurolophini by Ramírez-Velasco et al. in 2021. The cladogram below displays the results of their phylogenetic analysis:

- - Parasaurolophini
    - - Tlatolophus galorum
      - - Blasisaurus canudoi
        - Charonosaurus jiayinensis
    - - Parasaurolophus cyrtocristatus
      - - Parasaurolophus tubicen
        - Parasaurolophus walkeri
  - Lambeosaurini
    - Kazaklambia convincens
    - - - Arenysaurus ardevoli
        - Amurosaurus riabinini
        - Sahaliyania elunchunorum
        - Velafrons coahuilensis
      - - Hypacrosaurus altispinus
        - Hypacrosaurus stebingeri
        - Olorotitan arharensis
        - - Magnapaulia laticaudus
          - - - Corythosaurus casuarius
              - Corythosaurus intermedius
            - - Lambeosaurus lambei
              - Lambeosaurus magnicristatus

== See also ==
- Timeline of hadrosaur research
