= Cerro del Pueblo Formation =

Geological formation in Mexico

- Stratigraphic range: Campanian; ~73.6–72.7 Ma
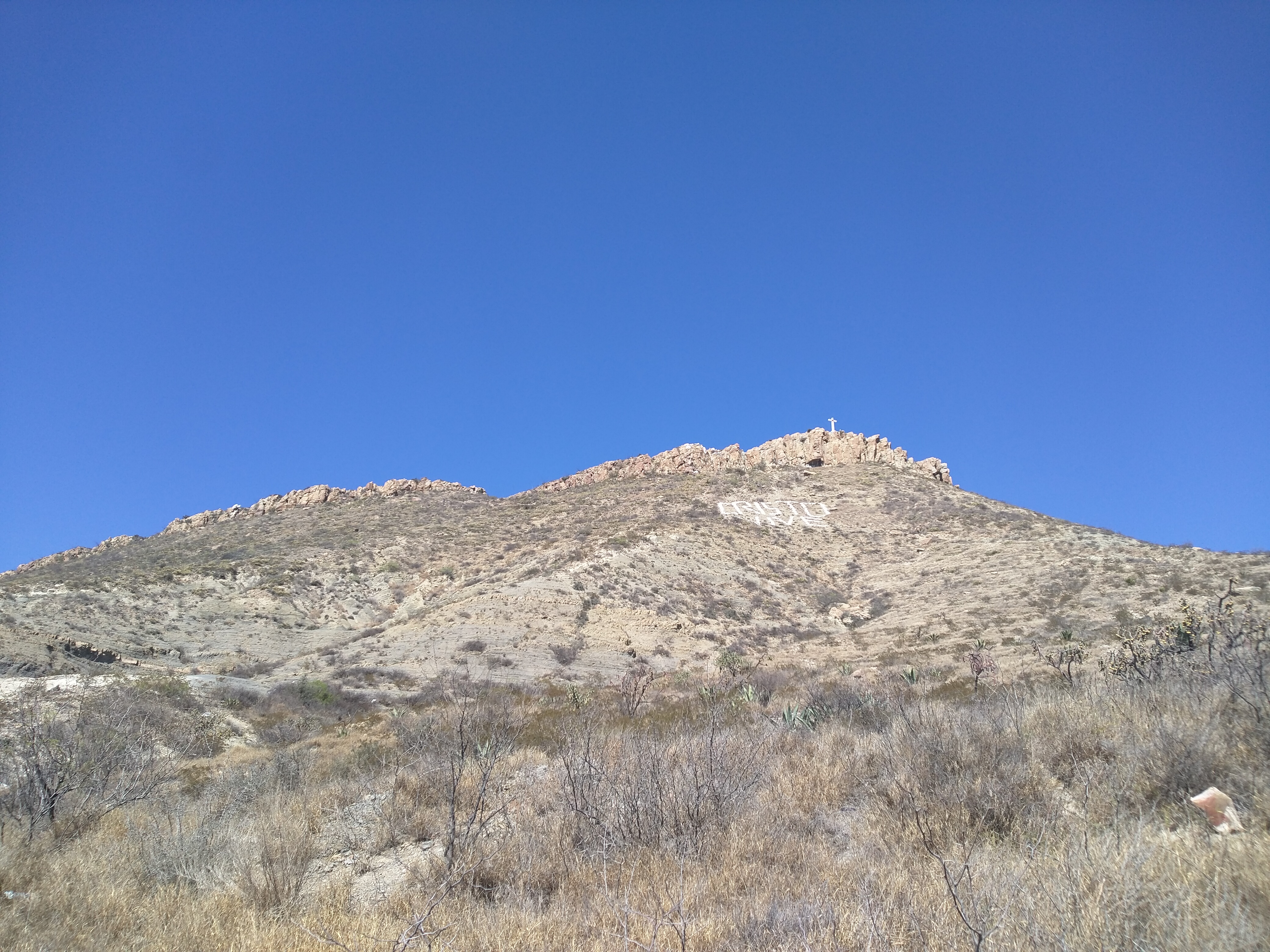
- Type: Geological formation
- Unit of: Difunta Group
- Underlies: Cerro Huerta Formation
- Overlies: Parras Shale
- Thickness: 160 m (520 ft)

Lithology
- Primary: Mudstone, sandstone
- Other: Siltstone, conglomerate, limestone

Location
- Coordinates: 26.1°N 101.1°W
- Approximate paleocoordinates: 32.2°N 75.5°W
- Region: Coahuila
- Country: Mexico
- Extent: Parras Basin
- Cerro del Pueblo Formation (Mexico) Cerro del Pueblo Formation (Coahuila)

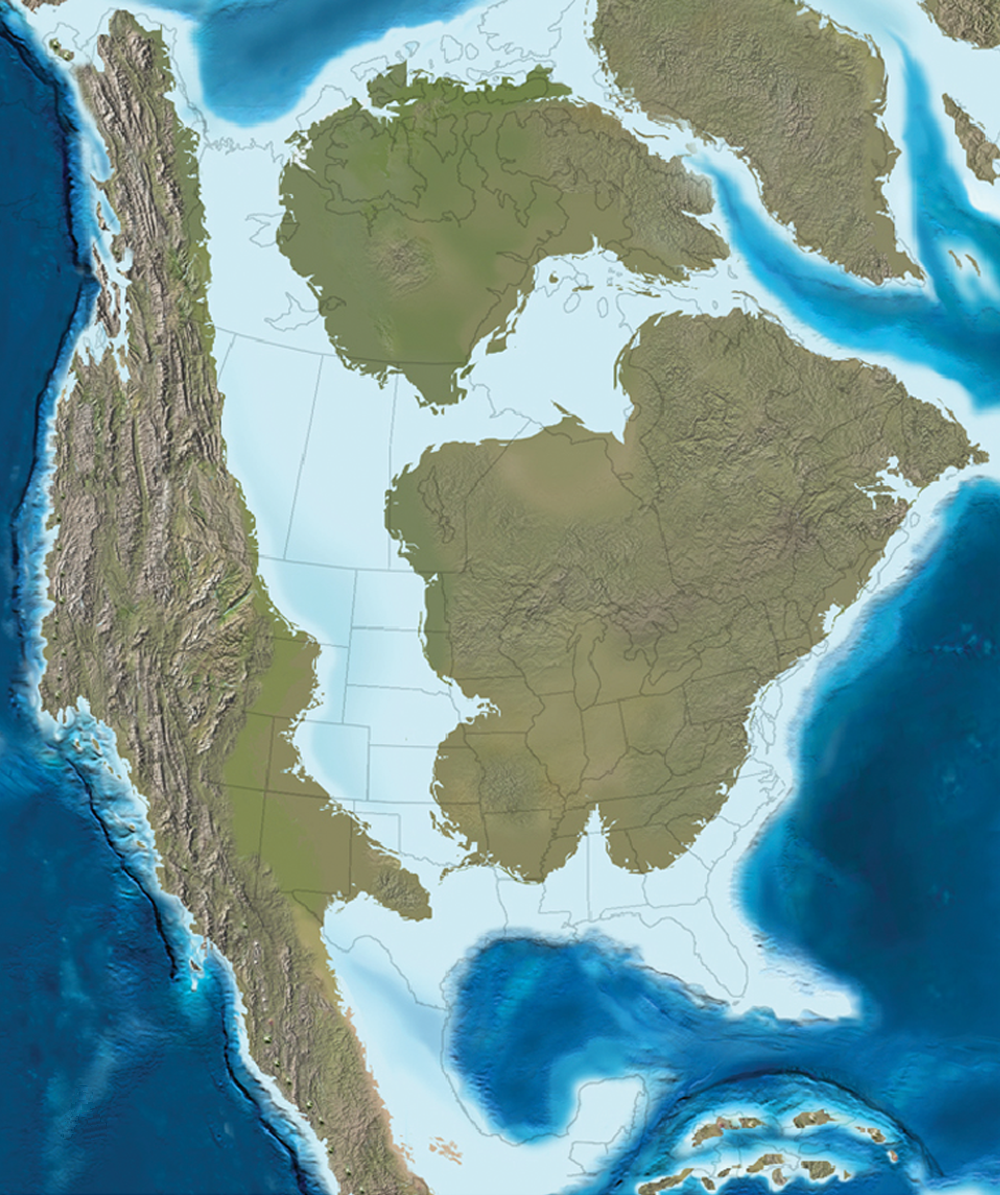
Paleogeography of the Campanian

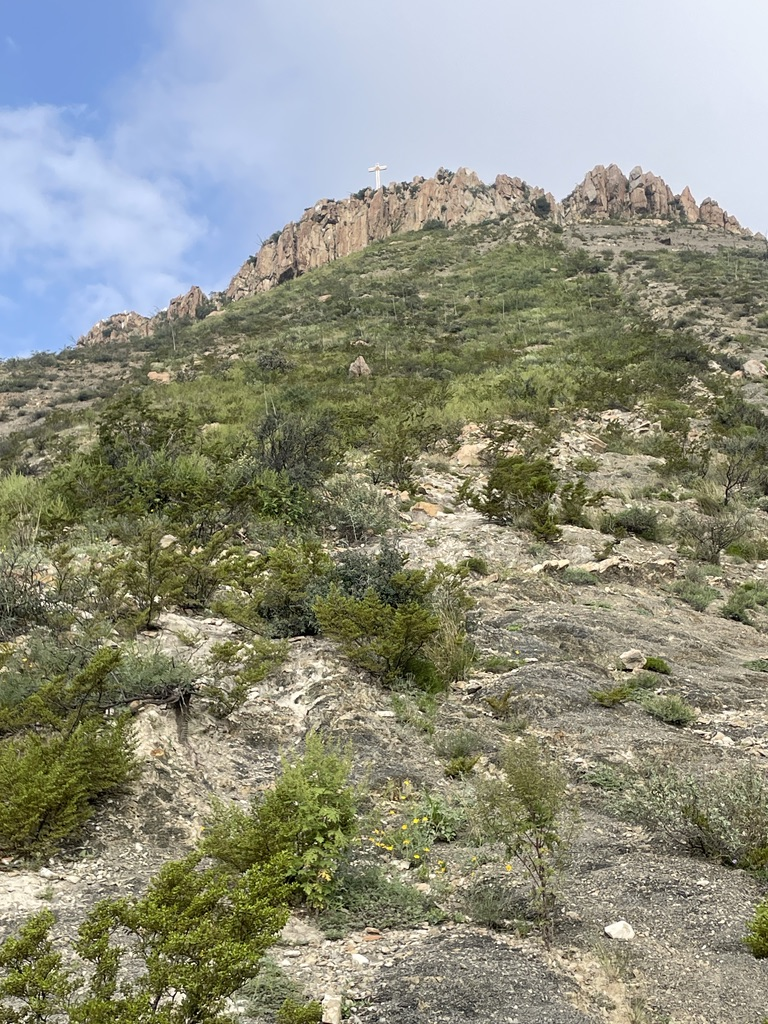
Outcrops of the Cerro del Pueblo Formation at the type locality of Cerro del Pueblo, on the edge of Saltillo, Coahuila

The Cerro del Pueblo Formation is a geological formation in Saltillo, capital city of the state of Coahuila, Mexico, whose strata date back to the latest Campanian of the Late Cretaceous, just before the Campanian-Maastrichtian boundary. Dinosaur remains are among the fossils that have been recovered from the formation. The formation is believed to correlate with the Baculites reesidesi and Baculites jenseni ammonite zones, which dates it to 73.63-72.74 Ma.

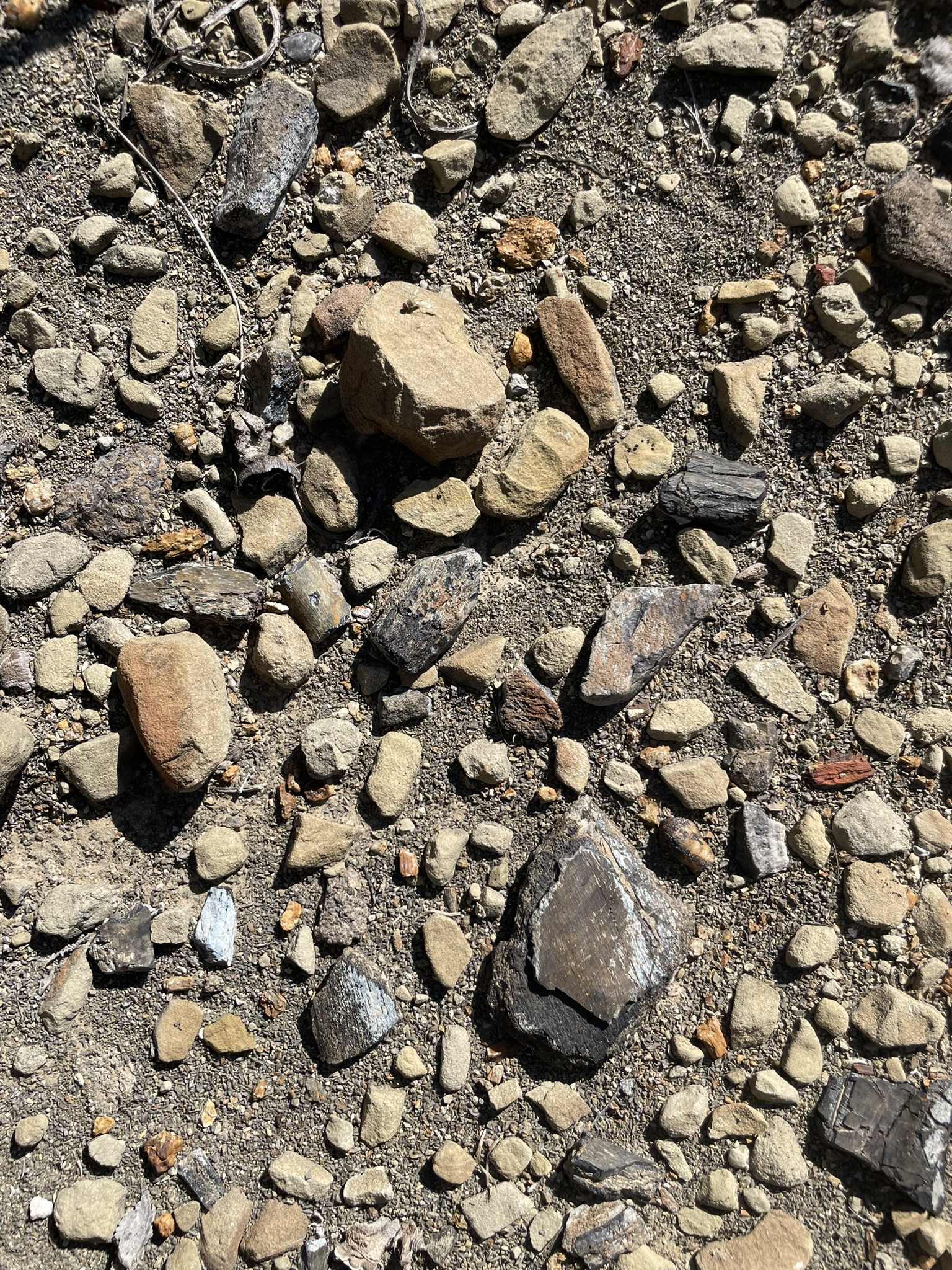
Fragments of a hadrosaur skeleton weathering out of the Cerro del Pueblo Formation near Rincon Colorado, Coahuila

The Cerro del Pueblo Formation includes marine, brackish, and non-marine environments, and was laid down in a coastal lowland environment, with Coahuila being on the edge of the Western Interior Seaway at the time. Fossils are abundant in the Cerro del Pueblo Formation, and include dinosaurs and other vertebrates, plants and seeds, and invertebrates including oysters, snails, and other molluscs. The formation is underlain by the Parras Shale and is overlain by the Cerro Huerta Formation.

== Paleobiota ==
=== Dinosaurs ===
==== Ornithischians ====
Remains of the following ornithischians have been found in the formation:

===== Ankylosaurs =====
Ankylosaurs of the Cerro del Pueblo Formation
Genus	Species	Material	Notes	Images
Ankylosauria	Indeterminate	A femur fragment, phalanx and a possible osteoderm.	Indeterminate ankylosaur remains.	
Ankylosauridae	Indeterminate	Osteoderms.	Indeterminate ankylosaurid remains.	
Nodosauridae	Indeterminate	A caudal vertebra, osteoderms and a tooth.	Indeterminate nodosaurid remains.	

===== Ceratopsians =====
Ceratopsians of the Cerro del Pueblo Formation
Genus	Species	Material	Notes	Images
Centrosaurinae	Indeterminate	A partial right squamosal.	Probably represents a new taxon.	
Ceratopsidae	Indeterminate	Squamosal fragment, metatarsal, metacarpal, sacral vertebrae, proximal end of femora, proximal end of ulna, possible frill fragments and teeth.	Indeterminate ceratopsid remains.	
Chasmosaurinae	Indeterminate	Supraorbital horncores, an orbit, dorsal vertebra, indeterminate cranial fragments, limb bones, and unspecified postcranial elements pertaining to juvenile specimens.	Indeterminate chasmosaurine remains belonging to juvenile specimens.	

===== Ornithopods =====
Ornithopods of the Cerro del Pueblo Formation
Genus	Species	Material	Notes	Images
Coahuilasaurus	C. lipani	Skull and jaw bones	A kritosaurin hadrosaurid	Coahuilasaurus Latirhinus Tlatolophus Velafrons
Hadrosauridae	Indeterminate	A braincase, postorbital, quadrate, laterosphenoid, dentaries, mandibles, maxillae, cervical vertebrae, dorsal vertebrae, sacral vertebrae, caudal vertebrae, neural spines, ribs, ilium, femora, fibulae, tibiae, humeri, ulnae, metatarsals, metacarpals, pedal phalanxes, pedal phalanges, pedal ungula, phalanges, phalanxes, various bone fragments, fibulae, scapulae, radii, coracoids, astragali, indeterminate pelvic bones, ossified tendons, isolated teeth and integumentary impressions.	Indeterminate hadrosaurid remains from numerous specimens.	Coahuilasaurus Latirhinus Tlatolophus Velafrons
Kritosaurus	K. navajovius	Predentary, symphyseal processes, rostral portion of dental battery of dentaries, rostral region of premaxillae, and fragments of maxilla.	A kritosaurin hadrosaurid, originally referred to K. navajovius, but reclassified to Coahuilasaurus.	Coahuilasaurus Latirhinus Tlatolophus Velafrons
Lambeosaurinae	Indeterminate	Maxillae, premaxillae, quadrate, partial braincase, dentaries, cervical vertebrae, dorsal vertebrae, sacral vertebrae, caudal vertebrae, neural spines, ribs, ilia, ischium, femora, fibulae, tibiae, humeri, ulnae, metatarsals, metacarpals, pedal phalanges, phalanges, pedal unguals, astragali, radii, scapulae, pubes and other unprepared elements.	Indeterminate lambeosaurine remains from numerous specimens, including a large hadrosaurid.	Coahuilasaurus Latirhinus Tlatolophus Velafrons
Latirhinus	L. uitstlani	Caudal vertebrae, scapulae, humeri, ulnae, coracoid, metacarpals, manual ungual, ilia, ischia, femora, tibiae, fibula, and astragalus.	Holotype specimen is chimeric as it consists of multiple individuals. Some material from the holotype specimen is assigned to Lambeosaurinae indet. and Saurolophinae indet..	Coahuilasaurus Latirhinus Tlatolophus Velafrons
Saurolophinae	Indeterminate	A braincase, brain endocast, dentaries, maxillae, cervical vertebrae, dorsal vertebrae, sacral vertebrae, caudal vertebrae, chevrons, neural spines, ribs, ilium fragments, femora, fibulae, tibiae, humeri, ulnae, metatarsals, phalanges, phalanxes, scapulae, a possible coracoid, radii, ossified tendons, and undescribed juvenile specimens.	Indeterminate saurolophine remains from numerous specimens, including juvenile individuals.	Coahuilasaurus Latirhinus Tlatolophus Velafrons
Tlatolophus	T. galorum	An almost complete skull, mandible, partial ilium, partial ischium, a femur, scapula, coracoid, sacral vertebrae, caudal vertebrae, and chevrons.	A parasaurolophin hadrosaur, closely related to Charonosaurus and Blasisaurus.	Coahuilasaurus Latirhinus Tlatolophus Velafrons
Velafrons	V. coahuilensis	Dentaries, predentaries, ceratobranchial, premaxillae, maxillae, jugal, quadrate, nasal, skull roof, cervical vertebrae, dorsal vertebrae, sacral vertebrae, caudal vertebrae, neural arches, cervical ribs, ribs, chevrons, scapula, coracoids, humeri, ulnae, radii, metacarpals, manual phalanges, ilium, ischia, pubes, femora, tibiae, astragalus, metatarsals and pedal phalanges.	A lambeosaurine hadrosaurid known only from a juvenile specimen.	Coahuilasaurus Latirhinus Tlatolophus Velafrons

===== Thescelosaurids =====
Thescelosaurids of the Cerro del Pueblo Formation
Genus	Species	Material	Notes	Images
Thescelosauridae	Indeterminate	A right premaxillary tooth and a posterior sacral vertebral centrum.	Indeterminate thescelosaurid remains.	

==== Theropods ====
Remains of the following theropods have been found in the formation:

Theropods of the Cerro del Pueblo Formation
Genus	Species	Material	Notes	Images
Caenagnathidae	Indeterminate	3 tibia fragments, distal, proximal and medial shaft elements respectively.	An oviraptorosaur. Two different morphotypes are suggested: a small one, less than a meter in length. And a big morphotype, almost reaching two meters.	Labocania aguillonae Mexidracon longimanus Paraxenisaurus normalensis Xenovenator espinosai
Dromaeosaurinae	Indeterminate	A pedal ungual and dentary teeth.	Indeterminate dromaeosaurine remains.	Labocania aguillonae Mexidracon longimanus Paraxenisaurus normalensis Xenovenator espinosai
Labocania	L. aguillonae	A partial skeleton	A teratophonein tyrannosaurine	Labocania aguillonae Mexidracon longimanus Paraxenisaurus normalensis Xenovenator espinosai
Mexidracon	M. longimanus	A partial skeleton	A ornithomimid theropod	Labocania aguillonae Mexidracon longimanus Paraxenisaurus normalensis Xenovenator espinosai
Paraxenisaurus	P. normalensis	Caudal vertebrae, femur, peses, manual phalanxes, manual ungual, tarsals, metatarsals, metacarpals, pedal phalanx, pedal phalanges, and pedal unguals.	Represents the first known deinocheirid from North America.	Labocania aguillonae Mexidracon longimanus Paraxenisaurus normalensis Xenovenator espinosai
cf. Richardoestesia	Indeterminate	A tooth.	A taxon only known from teeth.	Labocania aguillonae Mexidracon longimanus Paraxenisaurus normalensis Xenovenator espinosai
"Saltillomimus"	"S. rapidus"	Partial skeleton.	An informally named ornithomimosaur.	Labocania aguillonae Mexidracon longimanus Paraxenisaurus normalensis Xenovenator espinosai
Saurornitholestinae	Indeterminate	A pedal ungual, manual unguals and teeth.	Indeterminate saurornitholestine remains.	Labocania aguillonae Mexidracon longimanus Paraxenisaurus normalensis Xenovenator espinosai
Theropoda	Indeterminate	A neural arch, complete and fragmented pedal and manual phalanxes, manual unguals, unspecified vertebra, complete and fragmented caudal vertebrae, chevron, proximal end of femur, and unidentified bone fragments.	Indeterminate theropod remains.	Labocania aguillonae Mexidracon longimanus Paraxenisaurus normalensis Xenovenator espinosai
Troodontidae	Indeterminate	A pedal phalanx and a tooth.	Indeterminate troodontid remains.	Labocania aguillonae Mexidracon longimanus Paraxenisaurus normalensis Xenovenator espinosai
Tyrannosauridae	Indeterminate	A caudal vertebra, indeterminate vertebrae, tibia, fibula, fragments of ungual phalanges, phalanges, and teeth.	Indeterminate tyrannosaurid remains.	Labocania aguillonae Mexidracon longimanus Paraxenisaurus normalensis Xenovenator espinosai
Xenovenator	X. espinosai	A skull roof and braincase; isolated frontals	A troodontid with an expanded skull roof	Labocania aguillonae Mexidracon longimanus Paraxenisaurus normalensis Xenovenator espinosai

=== Pterosaurs ===
Pterosaurs of the Cerro del Pueblo Formation
Taxa	Presence	Description	Images
Ichnogenus: Pteraichnus	Saltillo, Coahuila	Specimens kept at the Dinosaur Tracks Museum, of the University of Colorado at Denver and the Secretaría de Educación Pública de Coahuila, Mexico; might also represent Haenamichnus.	

=== Turtles ===
Turtles of the Cerro del Pueblo Formation
Genus	Species	Material	Notes	Images
Mexichelys	M. coahuilaensis		New genus for Euclastes coahuilaensis, sea turtle	
Chedighaii	C. hutchisoni		A bothremydid turtle	
Yelmochelys	Y. rosarioae		A stem-kinosternid turtle	

Color key: Taxon / Reclassified taxon / Taxon falsely reported as present / Dubious taxon or junior synonym / Ichnotaxon / Ootaxon / Morphotaxon	Notes; Uncertain or tentative taxa are in small text; ~~crossed out~~ taxa are discredited.

=== Fish ===
Fish of the Cerro del Pueblo Formation
Genus	Species	Material	Notes	Images
Lepisosteus	L. sp.			
Amiidae	Indet.			

=== Fossil eggs ===
- Porituberoolithus sp.
- Spheroolithus sp.
- ?Prismatoolithus sp.

=== Mammals ===
Mammals of the Cerro del Pueblo Formation
Genus	Species	Material	Notes	Images
Cimolomyidae indet.			A cimolomyid multituberculate.	
Pediomys	P. cf. elegans		A pediomyid tribosphenidan.	
Taeniolabidoidae indet.			A taeniolabidoid multituberculate.	
Turgidodon	T. cf. russelli		An alphadontid marsupialiform.	

== See also ==
- List of dinosaur-bearing rock formations
- List of fossiliferous stratigraphic units in Mexico
