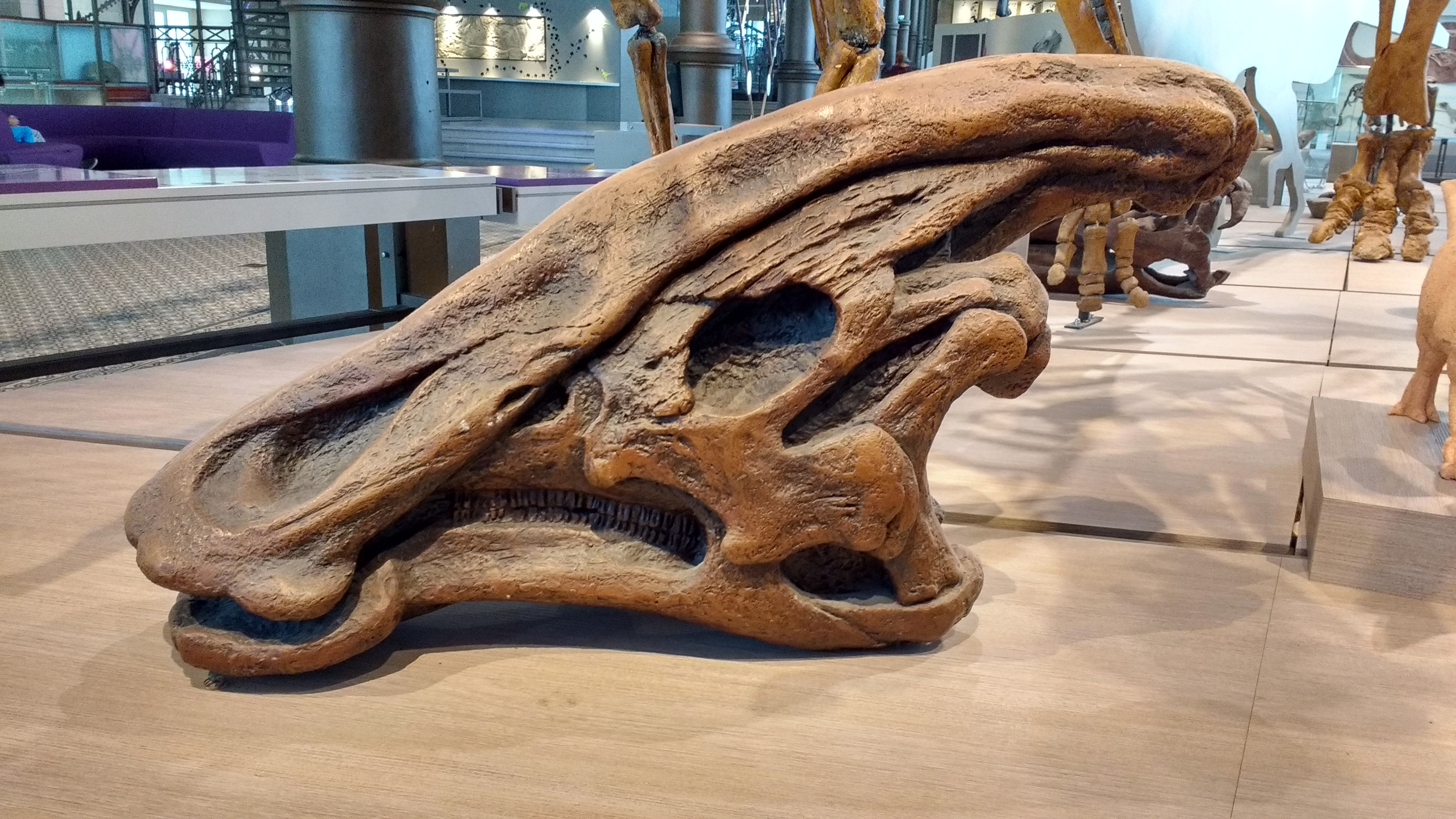
- Reconstructed skull

Scientific classification
- Kingdom: Animalia
- Phylum: Chordata
- Class: Reptilia
- Clade: Dinosauria
- Clade: †Ornithischia
- Clade: †Ornithopoda
- Family: †Hadrosauridae
- Subfamily: †Lambeosaurinae
- Tribe: †Parasaurolophini
- Genus: †Charonosaurus; Godefroit, Zan & Jin, 2000
- Species: †C. jiayinensis

Binomial name
- †Charonosaurus jiayinensis Godefroit, Zan & Jin, 2000

= Charonosaurus =

Charonosaurus Temporal range: Late Cretaceous, 66 Ma

Extinct genus of dinosaurs

Charonosaurus (/kəˌroʊnəˈsɔːrəs/ kə-ROH-nə-SOR-əs; meaning "Charon's lizard") is a genus of lambeosaurine hadrosaurid dinosaur similar to Parasaurolophus that lived in the latest Cretaceous Yuliangze Formation of China. Its fossils were described by Godefroit, Zan, and Jin in 2000, on the south bank of the Amur River, dividing China from Russia. It is monotypic, consisting of the species, C. jiayinensis.

== History of discovery ==
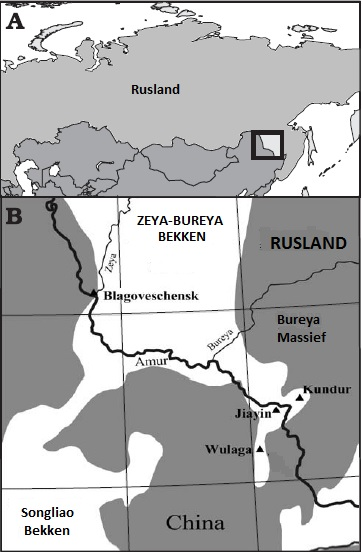
The Amur/Heilongjiang region. Triangles indicate sites where hadrosaur fossils are known.

The strata of the Yuliangze Formation are in the county of Jiayin, on the Amur River, which lies on the border between China and Russia. Hadrosaur fossils had been recovered from the formation in the summers of 1916–1917, as part of expeditions conducted by the Russian Geological Committee. Taxa described based on these early expeditions include Mandchurosaurus amurensis and Saurolophus krystofovici, both named by Anatoly Riabinin. The former's validity has been historically debated, while the latter, based solely on a partial ischium, is considered a nomen dubium. Starting in 1975, various Chinese institutions conducted excavations in Yuliangze strata. From that year onwards, large bonebeds consisting of both juveniles and adults of a large hadrosaur were discovered in the strata of the Yuliangze Formation. The hadrosaur fossils in the bonebeds appear to belong to a single taxon, which apparently died en masse in the vicinity. One specimen recovered from the Yuliangze was CUST J-V1251-57, a partial skull. In 2000, Pascal Godefroit, Shuqin Zan and Liyong Jin erected a new genus and species, Charonosaurus jiayinensis, to accommodate the Yuliangze material, and designated CUST J-V1251-57 as the holotype specimen. The genus name is derived from Charon, the ferryman from Greek mythology who carried the dead across the dead river Acheron (or Styx), and the ancient Greek "sauros" (lizard). The species name jiayinensis refers to the type locality (site) Jiayin.

== Description ==
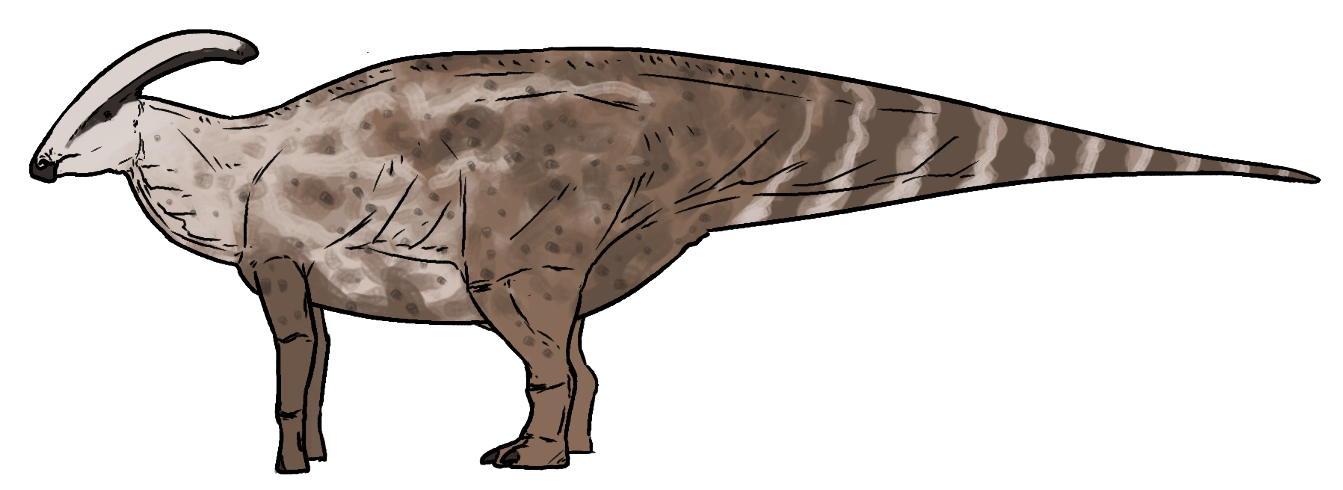
Life restoration

Charonosaurus is a very large lambeosaurine hadrosaur, estimated around 10 metres (33 ft) in length and 5 metric tons (5.5 short tons) in body mass. It is known from a partial skull (Holotype: CUST J-V1251-57 (Changchun University of Sciences and Technology, Changchun, Jilin Province, China) found in the Late Maastrichtian Yuliangze Formation, west of Jiayin village, Heilongjiang Province, northeastern China. Adult and juvenile hadrosaur remains discovered in the same area and formation likely represent the same taxon and supply information on most of the postcranial skeleton; the femur length was up to 1.35 m (4.5 ft). The partial skull resembles that of Parasaurolophus and probably had a similar long, backward-projecting hollow crest, indicated by the highly modified dorsal surface of the frontal bones. Charonosaurus is one of the largest hadrosaurs currently known from Asia and indicates that lambeosaurines survived until the very end of the Cretaceous (lambeosaurines are not known from the Late Maastrichtian in North America).

== Phylogeny ==
A cladistic analysis in 2000 by Pascal Godefroit, Shuqin Zan and Liyong Jin based on 33 skull, tooth, and postcranial features shows that Charonosaurus jiayinensis could be phylogenetically more closely related to Parasaurolophus than to any other lambeosaurine. Characteristics that cannot be directly determined on the available bones were not included in the analysis. Eolambia and Tsintaosaurus were also not included in the analysis because these taxa are in need of revision according to Godefroit et al. The following phylogeny was conducted by Penélope Cruzado-Caballero et al. in 2013.

- Gryposaurus notabilis
- - Aralosaurus tuberiferus
  - Lambeosaurinae
    - - Pararhabdodon isonensis
      - Tsintaosaurus spinorhinus
    - - Jaxartosaurus aralensis
      - - Amurosaurus riabinini
        - - Sahaliyania elunchunorum
          - Parasaurolophini
            - Charonosaurus jiayinensis
            - - - Blasisaurus canudoi
                - Arenysaurus ardevoli
              - Parasaurolophus
                - Parasaurolophus cyrtocristatus
                - - Parasaurolophus tubicen
                  - Parasaurolophus walkeri
          - Lambeosaurini
            - Lambeosaurus
              - Lambeosaurus magnicristatus
              - Lambeosaurus lambei
            - - Velafrons coahuilensis
              - Hypacrosaurus altispinus
              - Hypacrosaurus stebingeri
              - Olorotitan arharensis
              - Corythosaurus casuarius

A study by Ramírez-Velasco et al. in 2021 place Charonosaurus closer to Tlatolophus and Blasisaurus than to Parasaurolophus. The cladogram below displays the results of their phylogenetic analysis:

- - Parasaurolophini
    - - Tlatolophus galorum
      - - Blasisaurus canudoi
        - Charonosaurus jiayinensis
    - - Parasaurolophus cyrtocristatus
      - - Parasaurolophus tubicen
        - Parasaurolophus walkeri
  - Lambeosaurini
    - Kazaklambia convincens
    - - - Arenysaurus ardevoli
        - Amurosaurus riabinini
        - Sahaliyania elunchunorum
        - Velafrons coahuilensis
      - - Hypacrosaurus altispinus
        - Hypacrosaurus stebingeri
        - Olorotitan arharensis
        - - Magnapaulia laticaudus
          - - - Corythosaurus casuarius
              - Corythosaurus intermedius
            - - Lambeosaurus lambei
              - Lambeosaurus magnicristatus

== Taphonomy ==
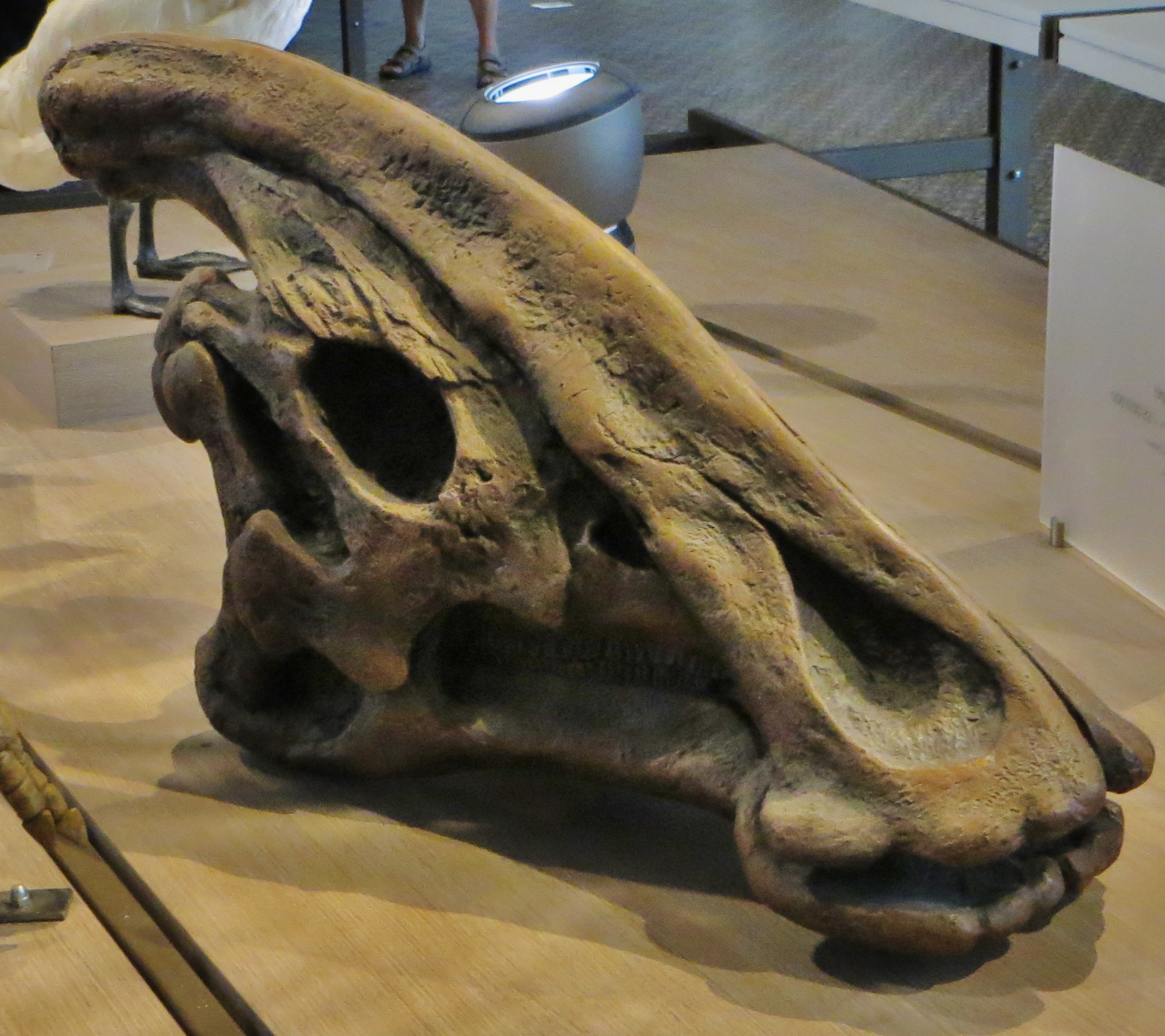
Reconstructed skull in semi-profile

In the Yuliangze Formation near the village of Jiayin, bone beds were discovered scattered over several tens of square meters, consisting mostly of bones of Charonosaurus jiayinensis. These bone beds contain numerous skeletons of both young and adult animals. They are out of anatomical alignment and intermingled. Long bones are oriented in one direction and the vertebral arches, spinous processes and transverse protrusions of the vertebrae (the apophyses) are broken off. These taphonomic features indicate that the thanatocoenosis formed in a river or stream environment with relatively strong currents, causing dinosaur carcasses to be concentrated and piled up at a low point in the landscape at the time.

The bone beds consist of about 90% lambeosaurine fossils. Bones of ankylosaurs, theropods, turtles, and crocodiles make up the remaining ten percent. The bones of the lambeosaurines of Jiayin belong to only one species, Charonosaurus jiayinensis, and there is no evidence that it lived with any other species of lambeosaurine in this restricted area. The abundance of ejected teeth from carnivorous dinosaurs shows that carcasses of Charonosaurus were torn up and consumed by predators and scavengers and/or that Charonosaurus was killed by these predators on hunts along a river.

== Palaeoecology ==
Charonosaurus jiayinensis is only known from the site at Jiayin. The thanatocoenosis of the type locality of this species further consists of an unidentified hadrosaurine, the lambeosaurine Amurosaurus, an unidentified ankylosaurian, the tyrannosaurid Tarbosaurus bataar, unidentified tortoises, turtles of the species Amuremys planicostata and unidentified crocodiles. The Blagoveschensk thanatocoenosis (Udurchukan Formation, Tsagayan Group) contains, in addition to hadrosaurids, an unidentified titanosaur, unidentified theropods, unidentified turtles, unidentified Nodosauridae, and unidentified crocodiles.

== See also ==
- Timeline of hadrosaur research
