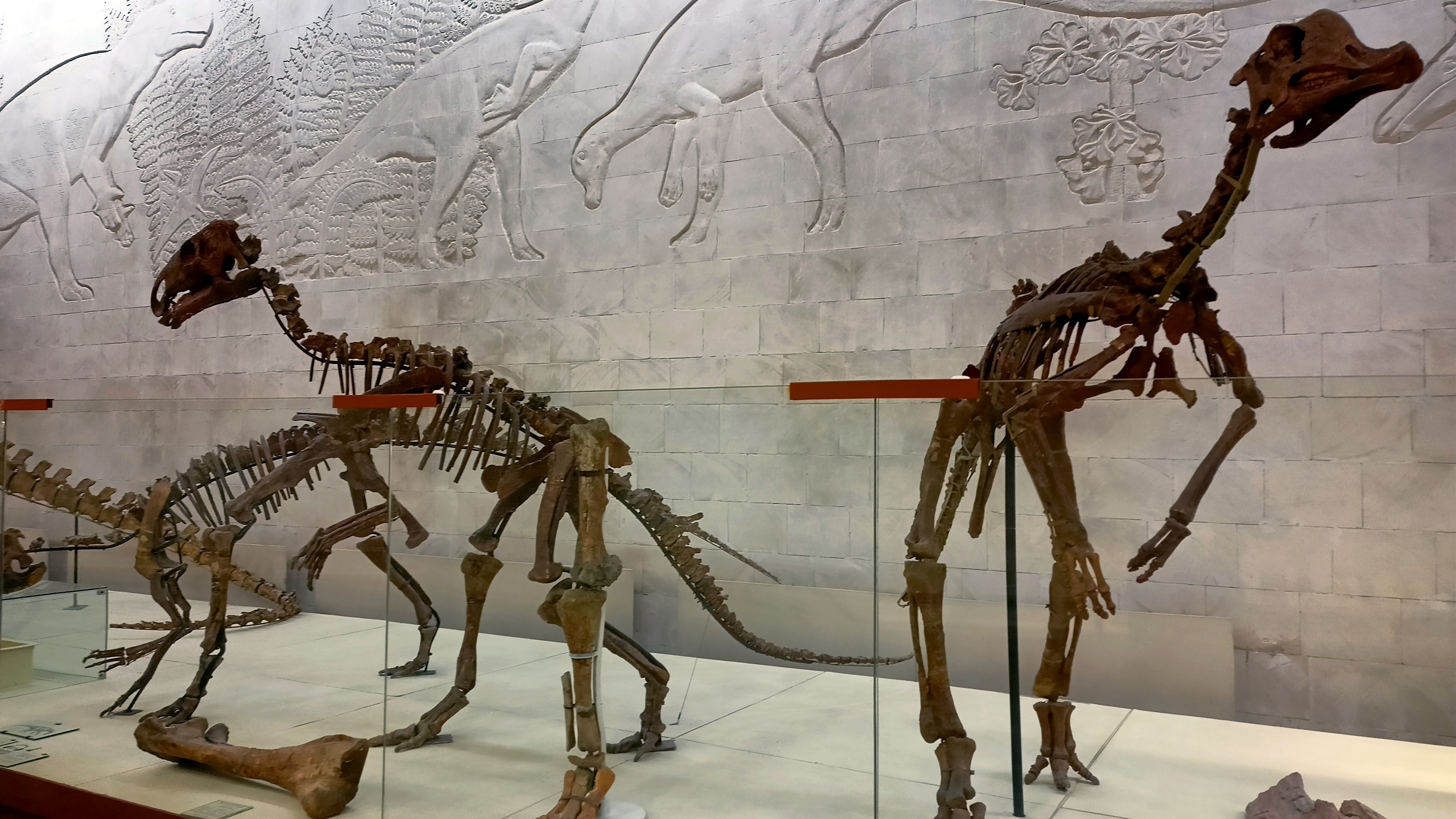
- Skeletal mounts of Kazaklambia (right) and Probactrosaurus (left)

Scientific classification
- Kingdom: Animalia
- Phylum: Chordata
- Class: Reptilia
- Clade: Dinosauria
- Clade: †Ornithischia
- Clade: †Ornithopoda
- Family: †Hadrosauridae
- Subfamily: †Lambeosaurinae
- Genus: †Kazaklambia; Bell & Brink, 2013

Type species
- †Kazaklambia convincens (Rozhdestvensky, 1968)

Synonyms
- Procheneosaurus convincens Rozhdestvensky, 1968; Corythosaurus convincens (Rozhdestvensky, 1968) Nesov, 1995

= Kazaklambia =

Kazaklambia Temporal range: Late Cretaceous, Santonian

Extinct genus of dinosaurs

Kazaklambia is an extinct genus of herbivorous lambeosaurine dinosaur known from the Late Cretaceous Dabrazinskaya Svita (Santonian stage) of southern Kazakhstan. It contains a single species, Kazaklambia convincens.

== Discovery and naming ==
In 1961, a nearly complete skeleton of a hadrosaurid was found at the Syuk-Syuk locality of the Dabrazinskaya Svita of southern Kazakhstan, 45 km (28 mi) north of Tashkent, Uzbekistan. This was the second discovery of hadrosaurs in this region of southern Kazakhstan following the decades earlier excavation of Jaxartosaurus, and the third hadrosaur discovery from Kazakhstan after Aralosaurus in 1957. The specimen, PIN No. 2230, was an almost complete skeleton only missing the snout of the skull, the hands and left foot, and the end of the tail, being the most complete dinosaur known not only from Kazakhstan but also from the entire Soviet Union. PIN 2230 was described in 1968 by Soviet palaeontologist Anatoly Konstantinovich Rozhdestvensky as the new species Procheneosaurus convincens, as the anatomy of its skull was similar to the species of Procheneosaurus known from the Campanian of North America, but details of its skull and skeleton allowed it to be distinguished. The species name was in reference to the discovery being "convincing" evidence of the Cretaceous age of the "dinosaur horizon" of the Dabrazinskaya Svita, which had been suggested to have been Paleogene in age and only containing reworked fossils. Rozhdestvensky extrapolated that the hadrosaurs from Kazakhstan would be from the Turonian to Santonian based on similarities to hadrosaurs from better-constrained deposits, and though the bed P. convincens was found in contained late Turonian mollusks, the similarity of the species to other members of Procheneosaurus suggested a younger, Santonian, age.

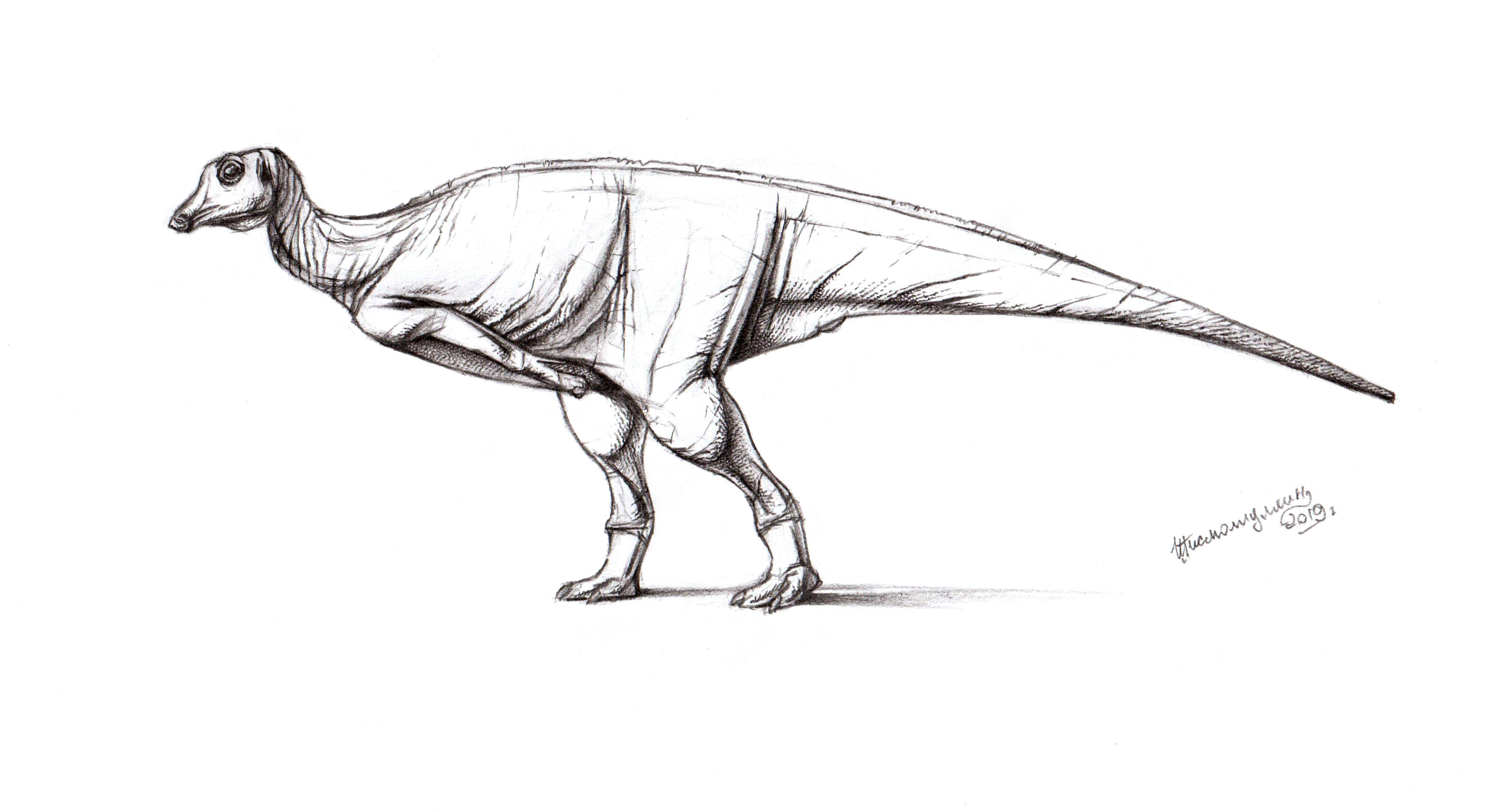
Life restoration of Kazaklambia

The status of Procheneosaurus as a distinct genus was rejected by American palaeontologist Peter Dodson in 1975 in a study that found the North American species of the genus were actually juveniles of Corythosaurus and Lambeosaurus, leading to uncertainty regarding the status of P. convincens. "Procheneosaurus" convincens was retained by Polish palaeontologists Teresa Maryańska and Halszka Osmólska as a distinct but uncertain species in need of a new genus in 1979 and 1981, as neither Corythosaurus nor Lambeosaurus could be shown to have been present in Asia as the adult form of "P." convincens. This opinion was not followed by American palaeontologists David B. Weishampel and John R. Horner in 1990 and 2004, who considered Procheneosaurus convincens as a junior synonym of Jaxartosaurus, but was supported by British palaeontologist David B. Norman and American palaeontologist Hans-Dieter Sues in 2000. In 1995 Soviet palaeontologist Lev Nessov wrote, incorrectly, that Maryańska and Osmólska had created the new combination Corythosaurus convincens for the taxon. Norman and Sues found that "P." convincens was questionably valid but could be separated from Jaxartosaurus by the anatomy of it skull, and that its age and completeness merited redescription and revision

"Procheneosaurus" convincens was revisited and partly redescribed in 2013 by Canadian palaeontologists Phil R. Bell and Kirstin S. Brink, who focused their study on the skull due to its diagnostic ability. Bell and Brink found that despite its juvenile status, "P." convincens could be distinguished from all other juvenile lambeosaurines as well as Aralosaurus and Jaxartosaurus of similar age and location, so they gave it the new genus name Kazaklambia in reference to the country of discovery and its status as a member of Lambeosaurinae. Kazaklambia would thus be one of the oldest genera of lambeosaurine known, following possibly Turonian Aralosaurus from the Beleutinskaya Svita and also Santonian Jaxartosaurus which was found at a slightly lower level of the Dabrazinskaya Svita. Combined with the early lambeosaurine status of Chinese Tsintaosaurus, this would support an Asian origin for Lambeosaurinae as a whole.

== Description ==
Bell & Brink suggested that Kazaklambia is morphologically distinct from other Eurasian taxa and known juvenile lambeosaurines at a similar ontogenetic stage in having a prefrontal process of the postorbital with a thickened dome lateral to the frontal dome, doming of the nasal above and in front of the orbit, and a frontal length/width ratio of less than one.

== Classification ==
Bell and Brink (2013) assigned Kazaklambia to the Lambeosaurinae, in a basal position. Morphometrics and morphological information suggest that Kazaklambia might be closely related to the basal lambeosaurines from Asia Amurosaurus and Tsintaosaurus, which was seen as proving an Asian origin of the Lambeosaurinae. The phylogenetic analysis of Ramírez-Velasco and colleagues in 2021 found Kazaklambia to be a primitive member of Lambeosaurini, though much of the relationships of Lambeosaurinae could not be resolved.

- Lambeosaurini
  - Kazaklambia
  - - - Arenysaurus
      - Amurosaurus
      - Sahaliyania
      - Velafrons
    - - Hypacrosaurus altispinus
      - Hypacrosaurus stebingeri
      - Olorotitan
      - - Magnapaulia
        - - - Corythosaurus casuarius
            - Corythosaurus intermedius
          - - Lambeosaurus lambei
            - Lambeosaurus magnicristatus
