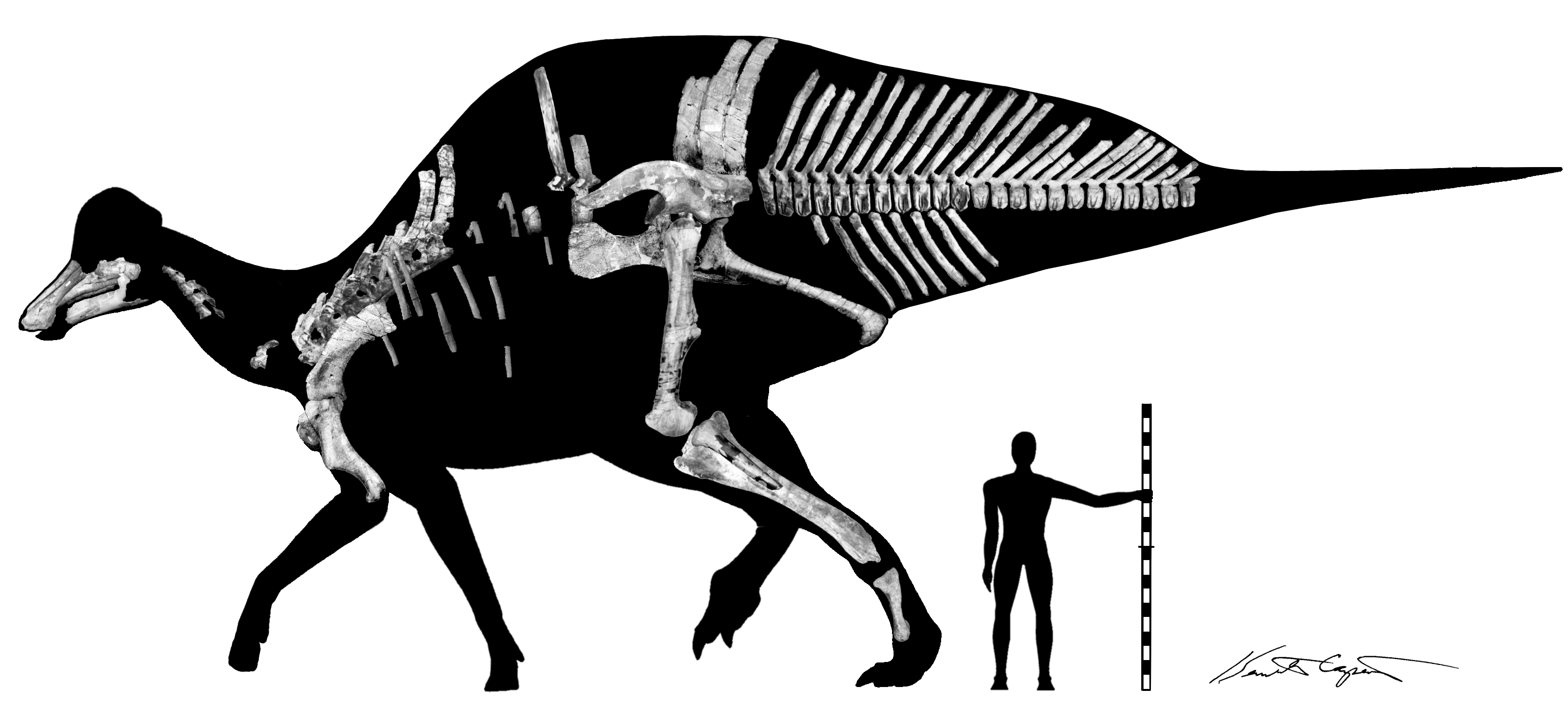
- Skeletal diagram

Scientific classification
- Kingdom: Animalia
- Phylum: Chordata
- Class: Reptilia
- Clade: Dinosauria
- Clade: †Ornithischia
- Clade: †Ornithopoda
- Family: †Hadrosauridae
- Subfamily: †Lambeosaurinae
- Tribe: †Lambeosaurini
- Genus: †Magnapaulia; Prieto-Márquez et al., 2012

Type species
- †Magnapaulia laticaudus (Morris, 1981)

Synonyms
- †Lambeosaurus laticaudus Morris, 1981

= Magnapaulia =

Magnapaulia Temporal range: Campanian ~74.7 Ma

Extinct genus of dinosaurs

Magnapaulia is a genus of herbivorous lambeosaurine hadrosaurid dinosaurs known from the Late Cretaceous (Campanian) El Gallo Formation of Baja California, northwestern Mexico. It contains a single species, Magnapaulia laticaudus, which was first described in 1981 as a possible species of Lambeosaurus by William J. Morris, and was given its own genus in 2012 by Prieto-Márquez and colleagues.

== Discovery and naming ==
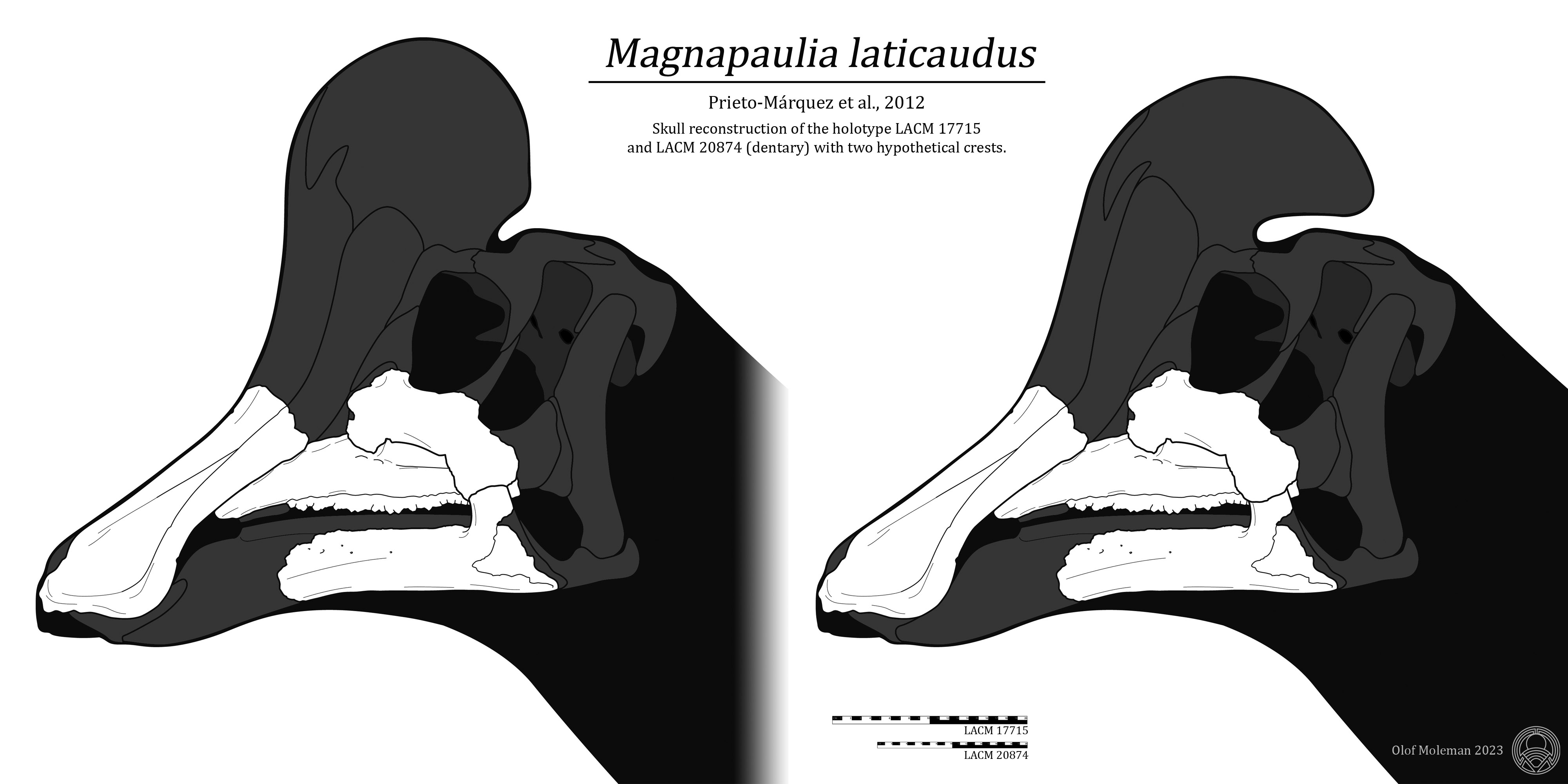
Diagram of skull material with speculative crest

Between 1968 and 1974, a team of the Natural History Museum of Los Angeles County headed by geologist William J. Morris excavated giant lambeosaurine remains from a site near El Rosario in Baja California. Morris named them Lambeosaurus laticaudus in 1981, based on type specimen LACM 17715, a partial skeleton with partial skull. Morris added a question mark to the front of the generic name to indicate its provisional nature: because no complete crest had been found for his species, and without it a definitive assignment could not be made. From what was known of the skull, he considered it to be most like Lambeosaurus. The specific name is derived from the Latin latus, "broad", and cauda, "tail". Morris interpreted this species as water-bound, due to features like its size, its tall and narrow tail (interpreted as a swimming adaptation), and weak hip articulations, as well as a healed broken thigh bone that he thought would have been too much of a handicap for a terrestrial animal to have survived long enough to heal. Between 1981 and 2012, other authors accepted it as a potential species of Lambeosaurus, suggested it could instead be a species of Hypacrosaurus, or questioned its validity.

In 2012 it was named as a separate genus by Albert Prieto-Márquez, Luis Chiappe, and Shantanu Joshi. The generic name is a combination of the Latin magnus, "large", and the first name of Paul G. Haaga Jr., the president of the board of trustees of the Los Angeles County Museum of Natural History. The 2012 study indicated that the remains had been found in a layer of the El Gallo Formation, dating to the late Campanian, about 73.6 to 73 million years old. The study referred numerous other specimens to the species: LACM 17698, 17699, 17700, 17702–17713, 17716 and 17717; LACM 20873-20876; and LACM 20883-20885. These had been found within a distance of three metres to the holotype and consist of partial skeletons, separate bones and skin impressions from several individuals, varying in size. In 2012 a complete redescription of the body parts was given.

== Description ==
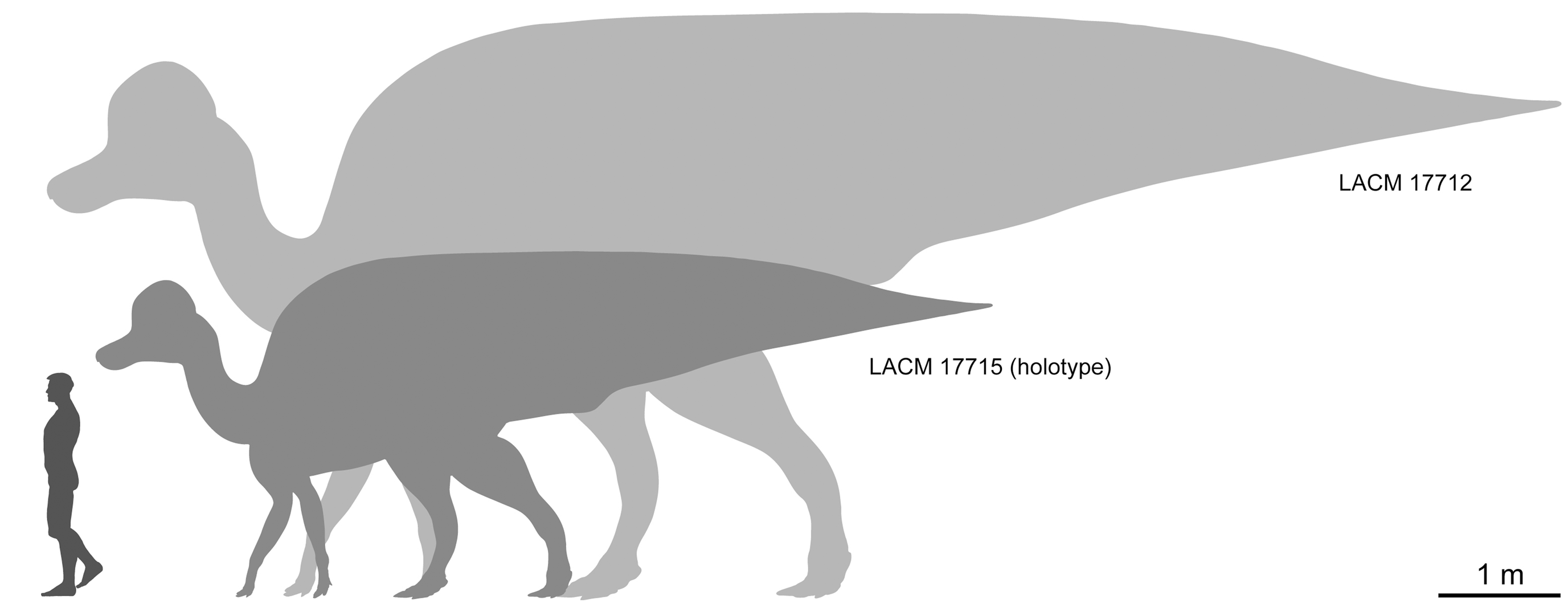
Size of two specimens compared to a human

Magnapaulia is noted for its great size and the tall profile of its tail, which had elongated chevrons and vertebral spines like those of Hypacrosaurus. Its size was estimated by its original describer as between 15 m (49.2 ft) and 16.5 m (54.1 ft) long, with a body mass of up to 8 metric tons (8.8 tons). Prieto-Márquez et al. (2012) provided a smaller estimate of around 12.5 metres (41 ft), still among the longest ornithischians and representing the largest known lambeosaurine, based on the largest known specimen (LACM 17712) with a humerus estimated at 80.3 cm (2.63 ft) in length. It has been estimated that Magnapaulia would have weighed up to 9.77 metric tons (10.77 short tons).

The redescription of 2012 established two autapomorphies, unique derived traits: the presence of chevrons at the tail base that were four times as long as the vertebral centra; and the possession at the tail base vertebrae of front joint processes, prezygapophyses, the inner bases of which formed a bowl-shaped depression that extended upwards into a deep trough on the front surface of the spine.

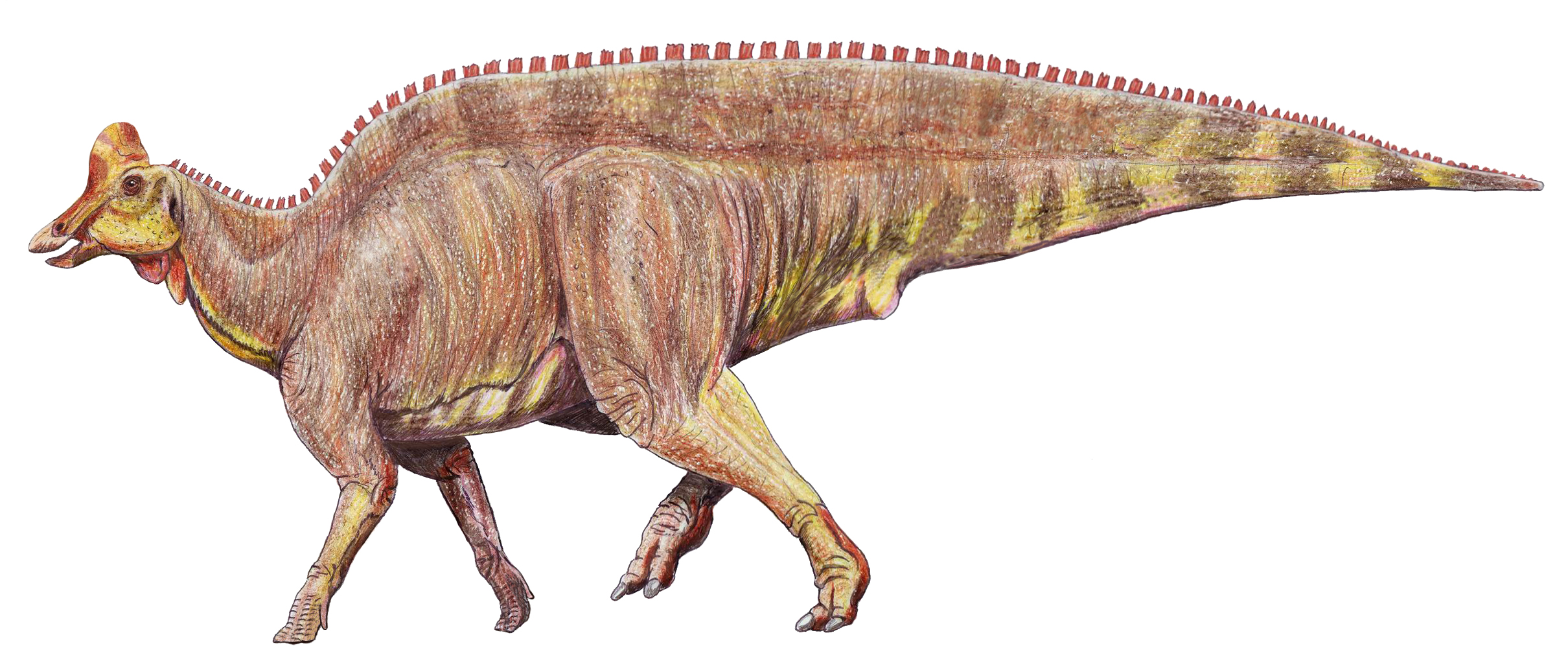
Life restoration

On the vertebral column, from at least the middle of the back to over the middle of the tail, a tall crest of almost continuous height was present formed by spines that were about four times as high as the vertebral centra.

Magnapaulia is among the many hadrosaurids that have preserved skin impressions; the tail of specimen LACM 17712 had large scales up to four centimeters wide that were surrounded by one centimeter-wide hexagonal and rounded scales.

== Classification ==
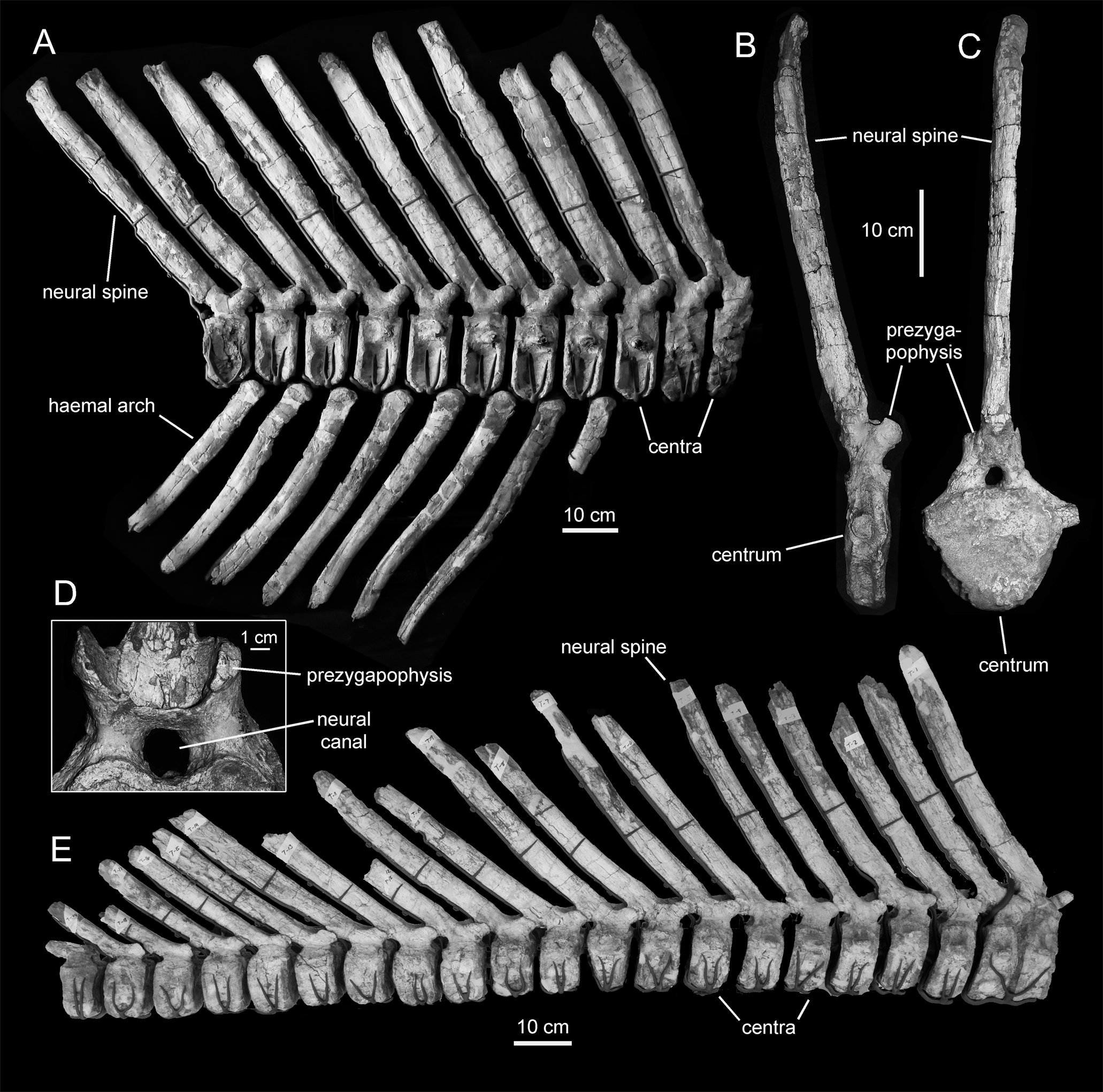
Tail vertebrae

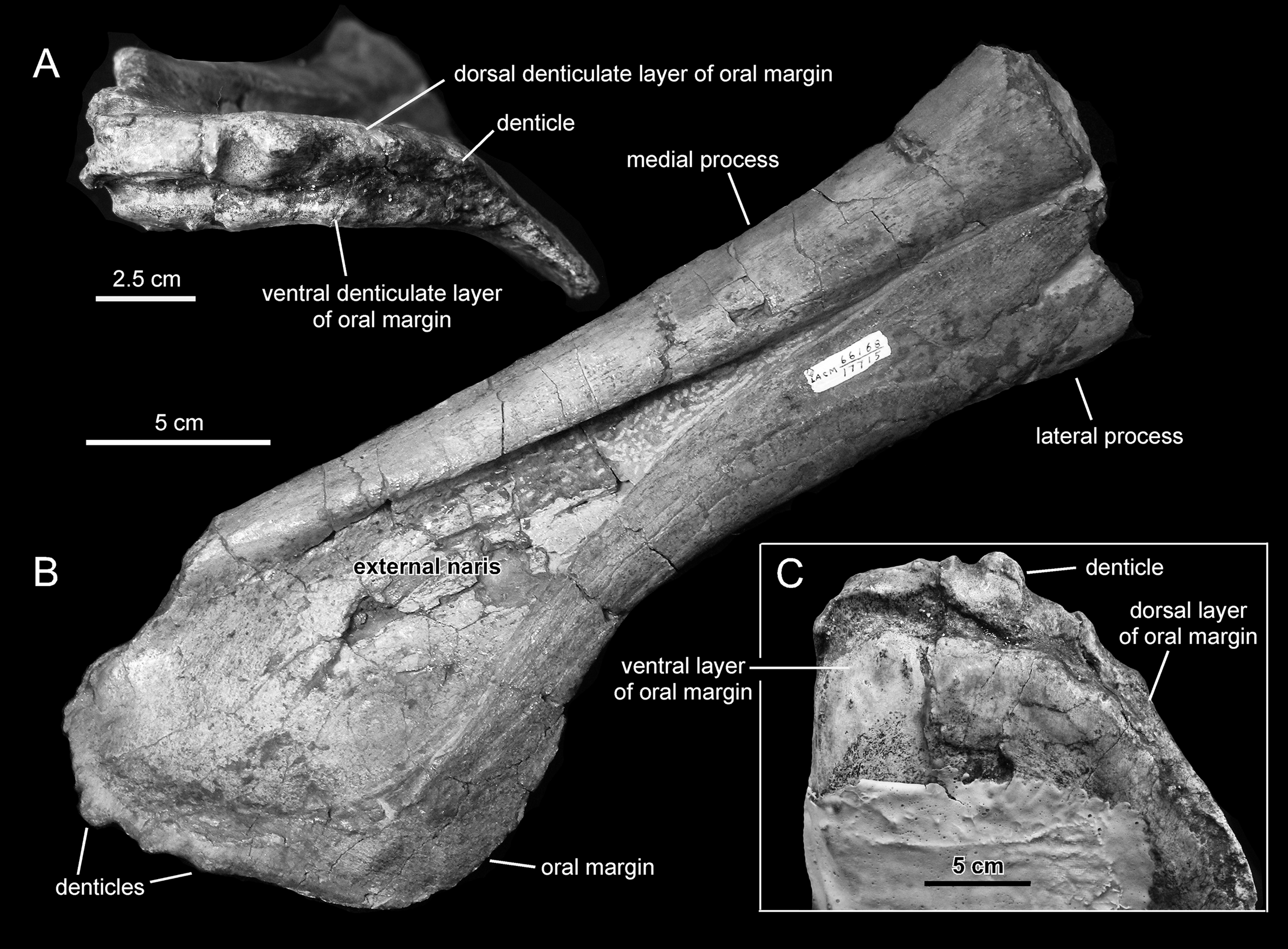
Left premaxilla of the holotype

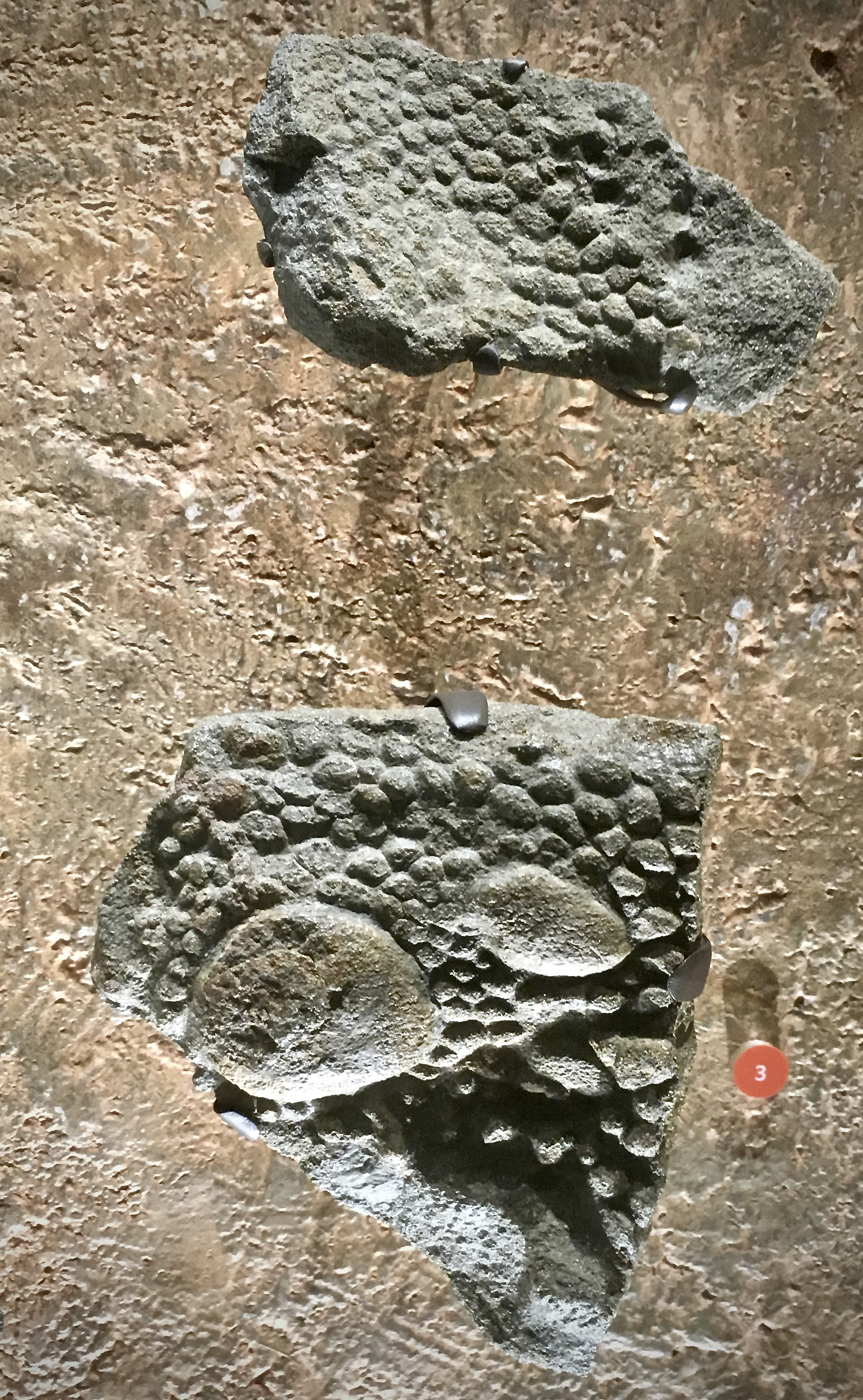
Skin impressions, Natural History Museum of Los Angeles County

In 2012 Magnapaulia was assigned to the Lambeosaurinae. The 2012 study contained a cladistic analysis which found it to be closest to Velafrons, also from Mexico, with this sister species forming a separate southern clade, itself the sister group of a clade of more northern Asian and North-American forms, including Lambeosaurus, Corythosaurus, Hypacrosaurus and Olorotitan. The cladogram below follows this analysis.

- - Telmatosaurus
  - - Lophorhothon
    - Hadrosauridae
      - Hadrosaurus
      - Saurolophidae
        - Saurolophinae
        - Lambeosaurinae
          - Aralosaurus
          - - Jaxartosaurus
            - - - Tsintaosaurus
                - Pararhabdodon
              - - - Sahaliyania
                  - Amurosaurus
                - - Parasaurolophini
                    - Charonosaurus
                    - - Parasaurolophus cyrtocristatus
                      - - Parasaurolophus tubicen
                        - Parasaurolophus walkeri
                  - Lambeosaurini
                    - - Magnapaulia
                      - Velafrons
                    - - - Lambeosaurus lambei
                        - Lambeosaurus magnicristatus
                      - - - Corythosaurus casuarius
                          - Corythosaurus intermedius
                        - - "Hypacrosaurus" stebingeri
                          - - Hypacrosaurus
                            - Olorotitan

== See also ==
- Timeline of hadrosaur research
