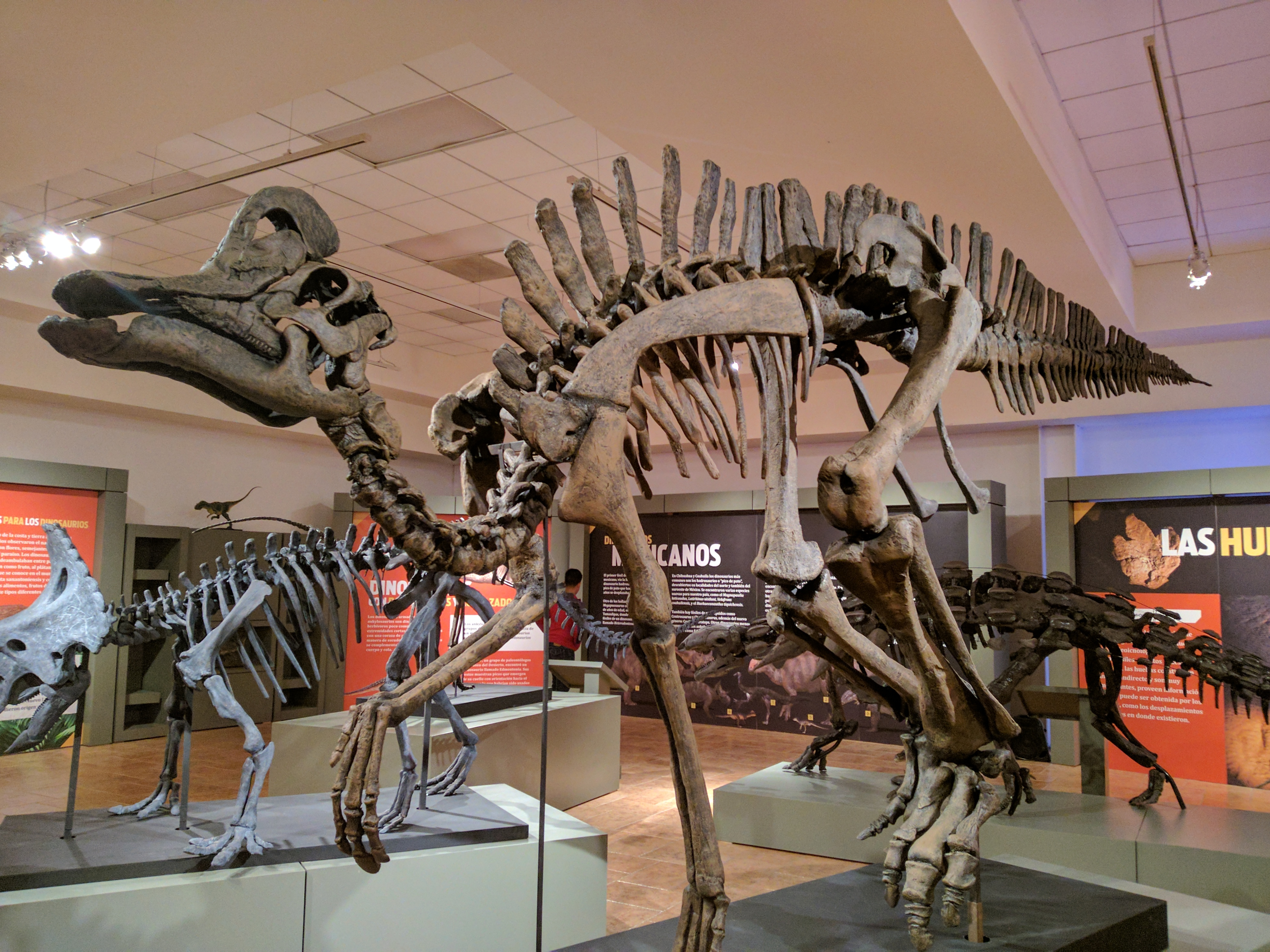
- Reconstructed skeleton, Museo del Desierto, Coahuila, México.

Scientific classification
- Kingdom: Animalia
- Phylum: Chordata
- Class: Reptilia
- Clade: Dinosauria
- Clade: †Ornithischia
- Clade: †Ornithopoda
- Family: †Hadrosauridae
- Subfamily: †Lambeosaurinae
- Tribe: †Lambeosaurini
- Genus: †Velafrons; Gates et al., 2007

Type species
- †Velafrons coahuilensis Gates et al., 2007

= Velafrons =

Velafrons Temporal range: Campanian, 73.5 Ma

Extinct genus of dinosaurs

Velafrons (meaning "sailed forehead") is a genus of lambeosaurine hadrosaurid dinosaur from the Late Cretaceous of Mexico. It is known from a mostly complete skull and partial skeleton of a juvenile individual, with a bony crest on the forehead. Its fossils were found in the late Campanian-aged Cerro del Pueblo Formation (about 73.5 million years ago), near Rincon Colorado, Coahuila. The type specimen is CPC-59, and the type species is V. coahuilensis.

== History of discovery ==
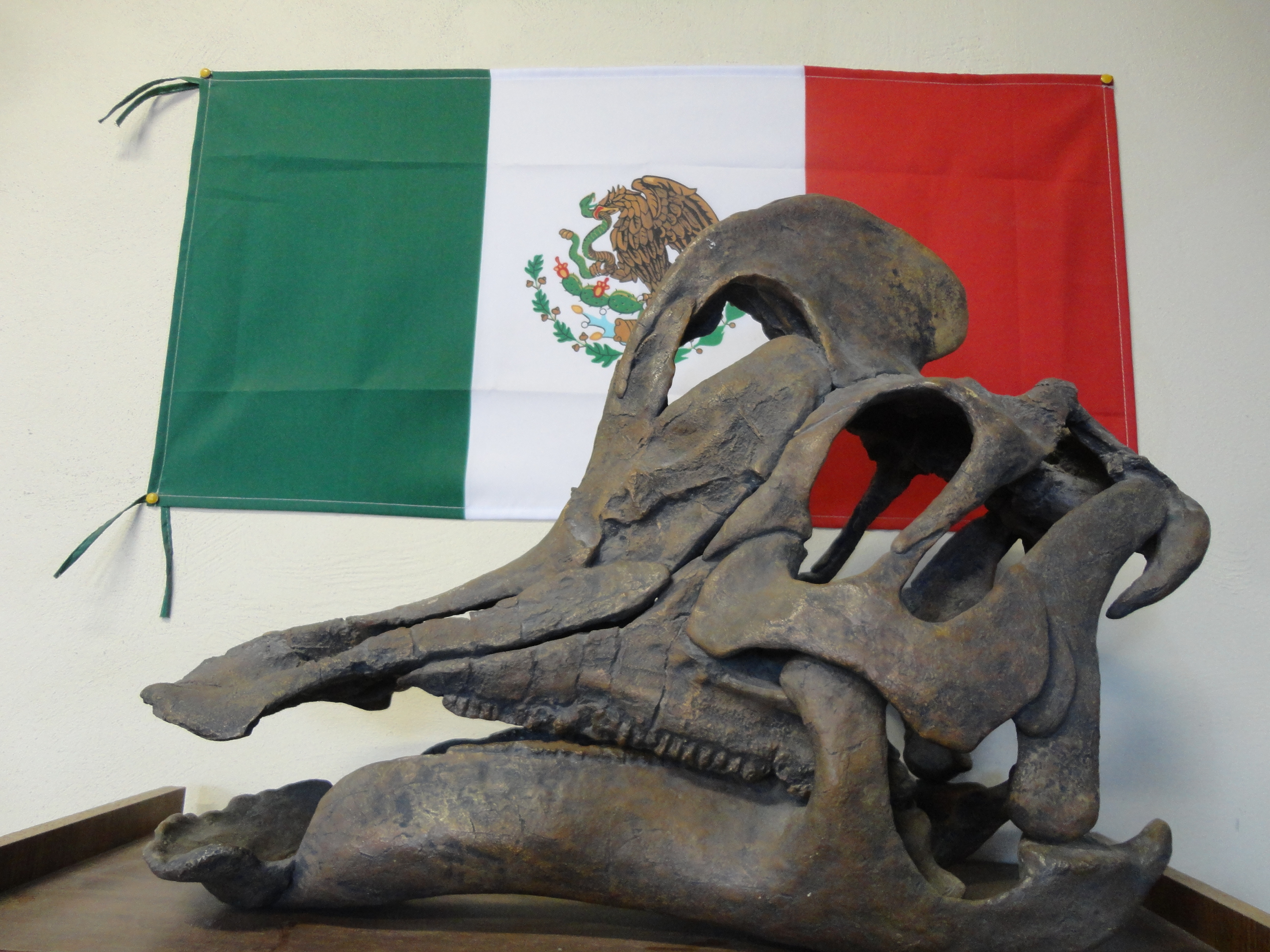
Skull of Velafrons

Largescale paleontological expeditions of the Cerro del Pueblo Formation in Coahuila began in 1986 with an expedition by the Royal Ontario Museum, which focused on a hadrosaurid bonebed near Presa de San Antonio. Subsequently, Dinamation International Society established multiple quarries around Rincon Colorado, including quarry 7A excavated from 1992 to 2001 where a mostly complete skeleton lacking a skull was found. In 2002, excavations of quarry 7A were restarted by the Utah Museum of Natural History, Royal Tyrrell Museum of Palaeontology and Museo del Desierto, where a disarticulated skull and partial skeleton was found within a calcareous grey mudstone by Hernández-Rivera. From magnetostratigraphy, the Cerro del Pueblo Formation is around 73.5 million years old, with the skeleton from around 335 m (1,099 ft) above the base of the formation. The skeleton and skull, CPC-59, was described in 2007 by American paleontologist Terry Gates and colleagues as the holotype of the new taxon Velafrons coahuilensis, the first new genus of lambeosaurine from North America in over 70 years. The genus name combines the Spanish word vela and Latin word frons as "sailed forehead" in reference to the cranial crest, while the species name means "from Coahuila".

Despite being one of the most complete hadrosaurs from Mexico, Velafrons remains only partially described, with its postcranial skeleton being undescribed. Gates and colleagues interpreted Velafrons to be a subadult individual based on absolute size and the crest anatomy, comparing it most favourably with the Corythosaurus specimen CMN 34825. As that specimen is only about 60% of the full adult size of Corythosaurus, that could suggest that Velafrons would be able to attain much larger sizes than its only known skeleton indicates.

== Description ==
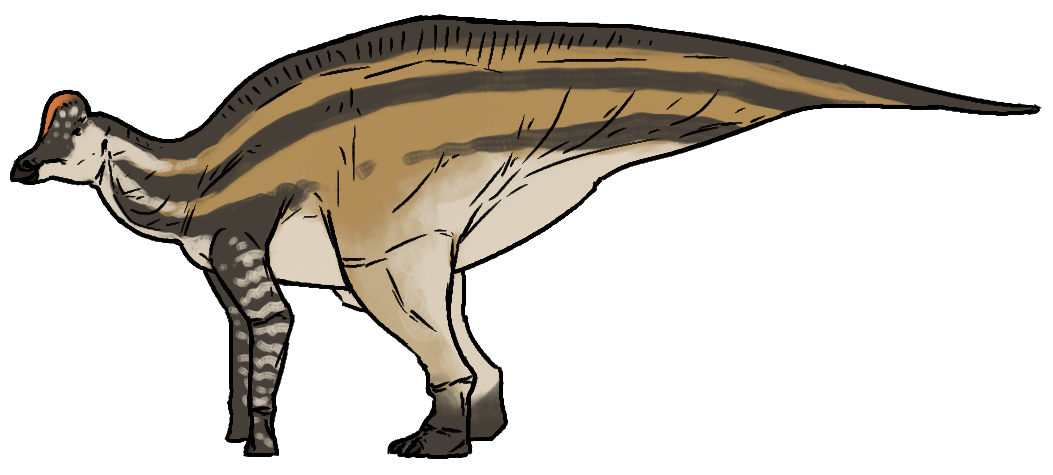
Life restoration

Velafrons was a medium-sized hadrosaur, measuring 7.5 metres (25 ft) long and weighing around 2.5 metric tons (2.8 short tons). It was mostly similar to young specimens of Corythosaurus and Hypacrosaurus, and was found to be a lambeosaurin in the phylogenetic analysis performed by Gates and colleagues in their description of the genus. The skull was large in comparison to skulls from other genera at a similar growth stage, so the crest may have been small in adults or followed a different growth pattern, or it may be that adult Velafrons were also larger than adults of other lambeosaurine genera. Unusually large size is also seen in the Mexican hadrosaurids Kritosaurus sp. and Magnapaulia laticaudus. As a hadrosaurid, Velafrons would have been a herbivore. The animal is known from several disarticulated remains, those being certain cervical vertebrae and a disarticulated skull.
