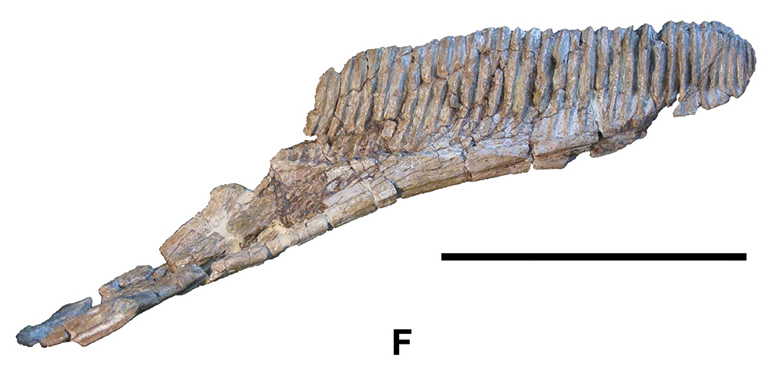
- Right dentary

Scientific classification
- Kingdom: Animalia
- Phylum: Chordata
- Class: Reptilia
- Clade: Dinosauria
- Clade: †Ornithischia
- Clade: †Ornithopoda
- Family: †Hadrosauridae
- Subfamily: †Lambeosaurinae
- Tribe: †Tsintaosaurini
- Genus: †Koutalisaurus; Prieto-Márquez et al., 2006

Type species
- †Koutalisaurus kohlerorum Prieto-Márquez et al., 2006

= Koutalisaurus =

Koutalisaurus Temporal range: Late Cretaceous, 67.5–66 Ma

Extinct genus of dinosaurs

Koutalisaurus (meaning "spoon lizard", in reference to the shape of the dentary) is a potentially dubious genus of lambeosaurine hadrosaurid dinosaur based on a mostly complete dentary recovered from the Maastrichtian-aged (Late Cretaceous) Tremp Formation near the town of Abella de la Conca, Lleida, Spain.

== Discovery and naming ==
The holotype dentary, IPS SRA 27, had previously been referred to Pararhabdodon in 1999, but comes from a different locality, is based on non-comparable material, and has unusual characteristics, leading Prieto-Marquez et al. (2006) to place the dentary in the new species Koutalisaurus kohleorum. Koutalisaurus was later found to be an invalid nomen dubium, although later studies do not reflect this hypothesis and still classify Koutalisaurus as a valid genus.

In 2007, a poster presentation and abstract at a conference suggested many of the hadrosaur specimens found at the Basturs Poble bonebed may have belonged to Koutalisaurus, but they cautioned an adult dentary from the bonebed would need to be discovered to test the hypothesis. This idea was later rejected after the Basturs Poble remains were reclassified as belonging to lambeosaurines such as Adynomosaurus and cf. Pararhabdodon.

== Description ==
The dentary is very elongate, and has a long toothless portion (the front of the jaw, including the end where the predentary would have been attached) that is bent steeply downward and inward, which would have given the jaw a spoon-like shape when complete. It is comparable in size, although on the small side and with unusual proportions (see above), compared to dentaries from other hadrosaurids.

== Classification ==
Prieto-Marquez et al. (2006) found the animal to be a hadrosaurid, but of uncertain placement within the family. More recent work by Prieto-Marquez and Wagner suggests that it is the same as Pararhabdodon as originally thought.

A 2020 study by Nick Longrich and colleagues describing the genus Ajnabia found Koutalisaurus to be an arenysaurin. The cladogram from their study's phylogenetic analysis is shown below:

- Hadrosauridae
  - Saurolophinae
  - Lambeosaurinae
    - Aralosaurus
    - - Jaxartosaurus
      - - Nipponosaurus
        - - Tsintaosaurus
          - - Arenysaurini
              - - Arenysaurus
                - Pararhabdodon
              - - Koutalisaurus
                - - - Basturs lambeosaurine
                    - Canardia
                  - - Adynomosaurus
                    - - Serrat del Rostiar lambeosaurine
                      - - Blasisaurus
                        - Ajnabia
            - - Parasaurolophini
              - Lambeosaurini

== See also ==
- Timeline of hadrosaur research
