= Basturs Poble bonebed =

Dinosaur fossils in Catalonia, Spain

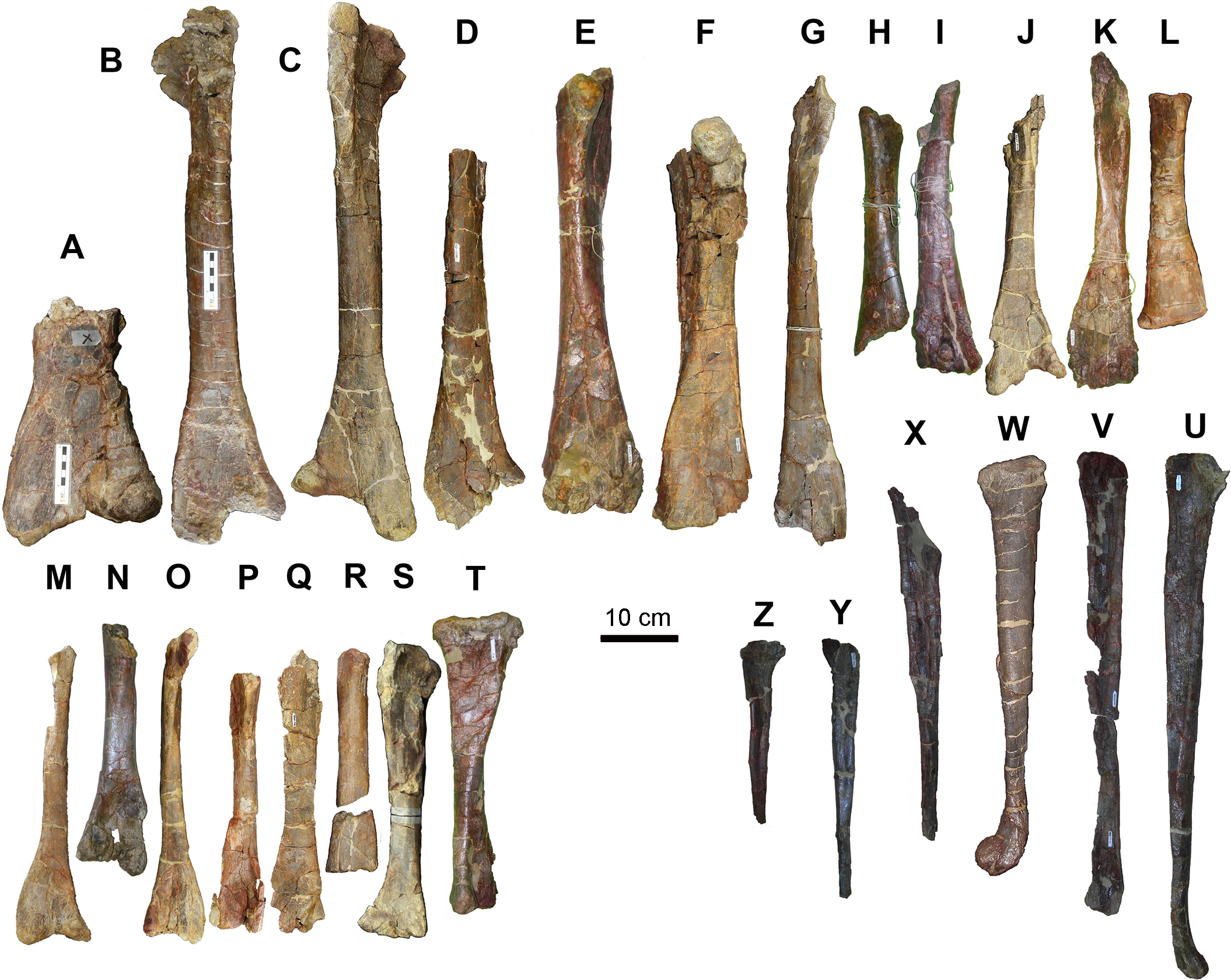
Hadrosaur tibiae and fibulae from the Basturs Poble site

The Basturs Poble bonebed is a mega-bonebed of hadrosaur dinosaur fossils, discovered in Catalonia, Spain. Hundreds of hadrosaur fossils have been found at the site, which would have been on a large island during the Late Cretaceous when the animals preserved were alive. Despite the enormous amount of specimens, taxonomically informative material has been scarce at the site, leading to extensive debate as to its nature. The number of species present, age of the individuals present in the sample, and taxonomic identity of the remains have been the primary matters of debate. Previously considered to represent Koutalisaurus, Pararhabdodon, or multiple, perhaps dwarf species, it is currently thought that a single, indeterminate species of lambeosaurine was present at the site, and that individuals of many different ages were present.

== Discovery and extent ==
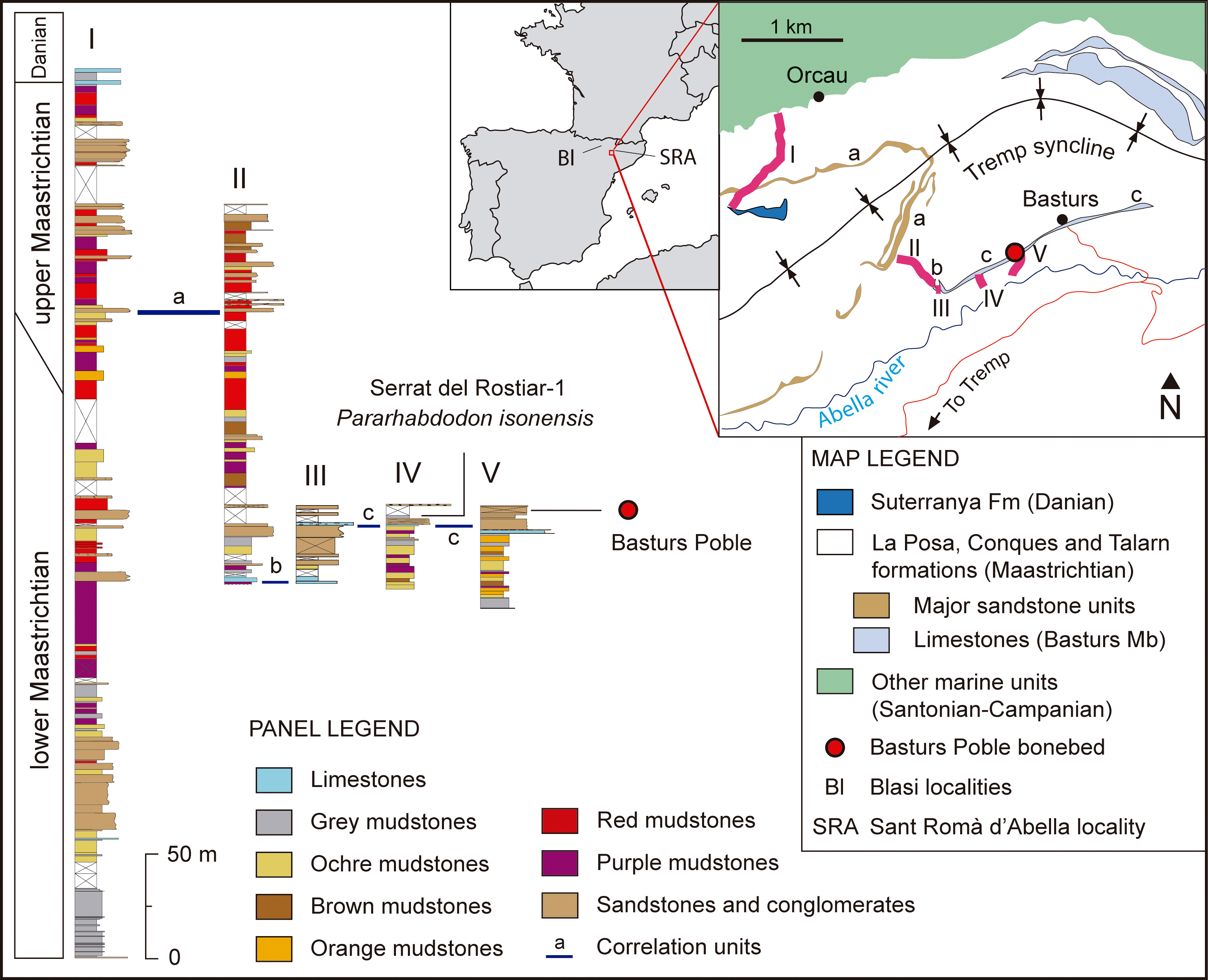
Map of the stratigraphic, geographic, and geologic context of the Basturs Poble bonebed locality

Marc Boada discovered, in the late 1990s, a new fossil-bearing locality 300 metres (980 ft) from the village of Basturs, Catalonia. As the village already lent its name to a locality where dinosaur eggs had been found, it was named the Basturs Poble (BP) locality, "poble" derived from the word for village. The locality belongs to the Conques Formation of the Tremp Group, dated to the late-Early Maastrictian. Over ten years, from 2001 through 2011, field work was done at this site, and a massive bonebed - consisting of some one thousand skeletal elements - was discovered. The discovery was first reported in the literature in an abstract at the "55th Symposium for Vertebrate Palaeontology and Comparative Anatomy and the 16th meeting of the Symposium for Palaeontological Preparation and Conservation" conference in 2007. The authors, then, approached the bonebed under the hypothesis of a single species being present at the site. It was reported that all ontogenetic stages were present.

The stratigraphic layer where the bonebed was found is 1.5 metres (4.9 ft) in thickness. Around 95% of all remains from the site belong to dinosaurs; nearly all identified specimens from this sample belong to hadrosaurs. Of prepared material, 270 skeletal elements can confidently be identified as belonging to hadrosauroids. The number of hadrosaur specimens from the site in total could number over 500, and possibly as much as 900. In addition to the large numbers of fossils of the animals themselves, the BP locality is one of many sites from the Tremp Syncline where hadrosaurs tracks have been found. At least one track is preserved at the site, in a sandstone block from a stratigraphic level similar to that of the bonebed. It is the richest hadrosaur bonebed ever found in Europe, and the largest ever found in one palaeoinsular locale; as such, it is the most important hadrosauroid site of the eastern Tremp Syncline.

== Number of species present ==
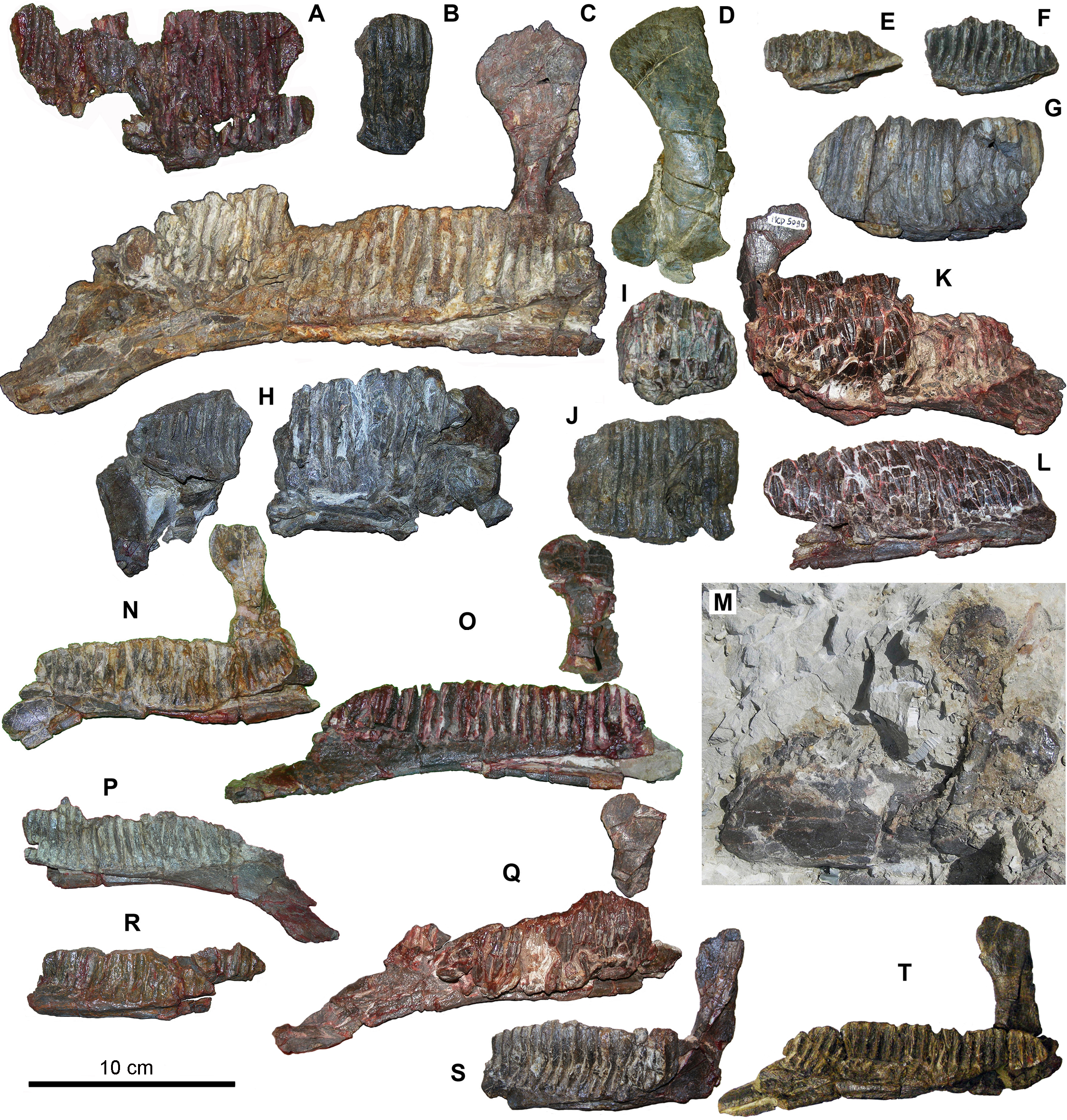
A selection of dentary material from the Basturs Poble bonebed

The primary subject of research regarding the bonebed has been the taxonomic identity of the hadrosaurs there - namely, whether only one taxon or multiple taxa are present. The question has been complicated by a rarity of cranial elements in the sample, since they are the most taxonomically informative areas of the skeleton in hadrosaurs. Initially, it was assumed that only a single species was present in the sample. In 2015, a study by Alejandro Blanco and colleagues performed multiple types of morphometric analysis to investigate hadrosaur diversity in from the Pyrenees using dentaries. The number of alveolar positions in the dentary was the primary metric for distinctiveness, as more basal taxa possess less, though it was noted this can also increase with age as an individual grows. Three morphotypes (groupings of specimens with a distinct anatomy from the other groupings) were found in the sample, of which two (numbers two and three) were present in the BP bonebed. Growth trajectory analysis of the different morphotypes supported their separation. Sexual dimorphism being the reason for different anatomy was considered unlikely due to different results in regression analysis. Morphotype three was interpreted as belonging to dwarf, potentially relictual hadrosauroids; and morphotype two was considered to represent larger, lambeosaurine animals. It was stressed each morphotype was not necessarily just one species, but merely representative of a distinct lineage of hadrosaurs.

In 2018, a more extensive study of the material was conducted by Víctor Fondevilla and colleagues, and the question of how many taxa were present of the sample was investigated using specimens from multiple parts of the body, as opposed to just the dentaries. Overall, a large amount of variation was noted in the specimens, but as it was gradual, rather than a case of two obvious morphotypes, the authors attributed it to individual variation. Regarding the dentaries, they too were not found to obviously sort into multiple morphotypes due to a high amount of variation between all of them. One particular dentary was noted to be rather distinct from the rest, but taphonomic damage or improper restoration during preparation of the fossil were considered possible explanations as opposed to taxonomic distinctiveness. The authors favored identification of the hadrosaurs present in the bonebed as a singular taxon of lambeosaurine.

== Size and age of the individuals ==
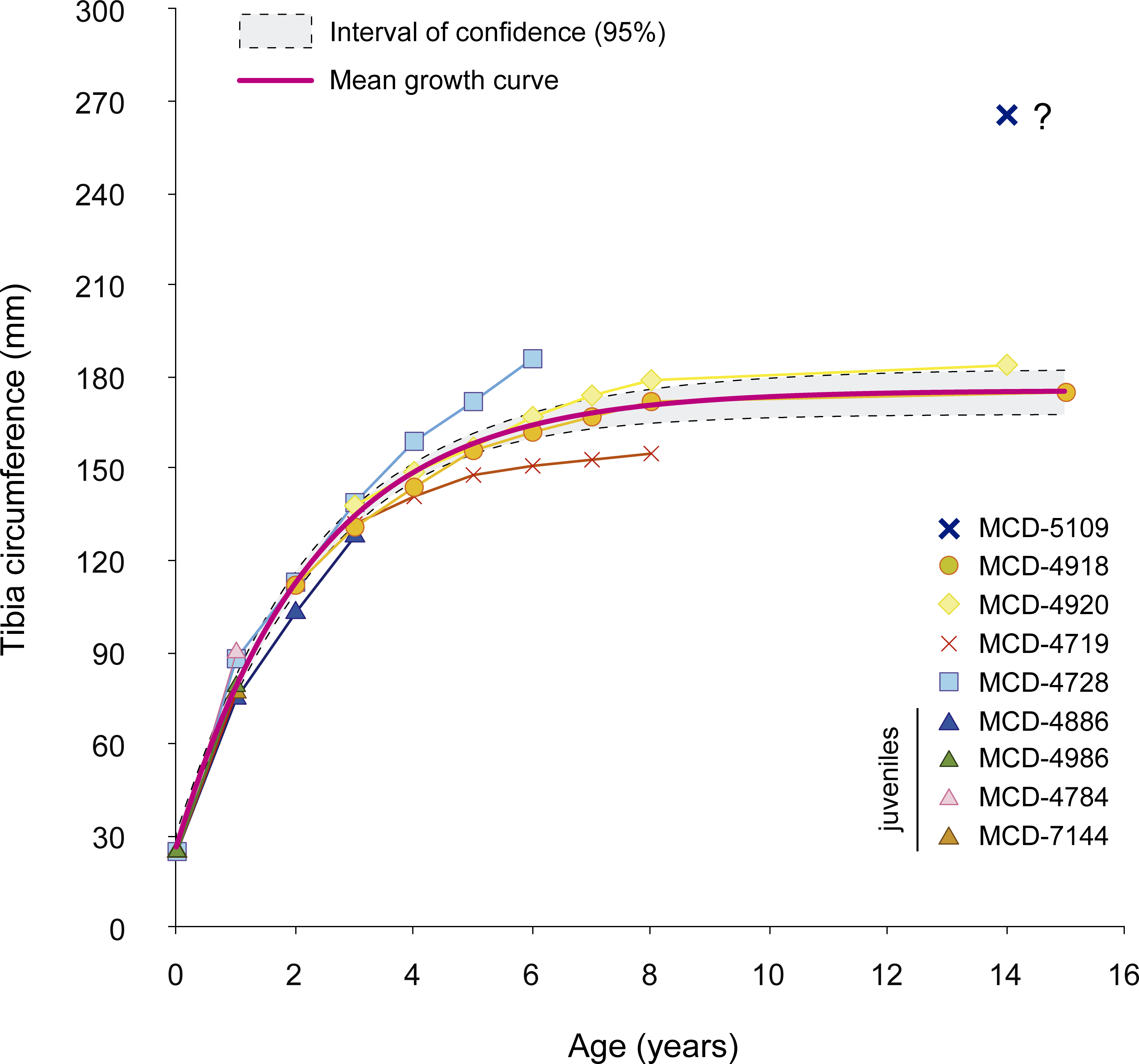
Growth trajectories of several tibiae, taken from a 2018 study of the taxonomy and ontogeny of the specimens

An intertwined subject to the taxonomy which has been noted and studied has been the size and ontogeny (growth and development) of the individuals represented. Individuals of multiple sizes are represented in the sample, but overall they represent smaller animals than the hadrosaurs known from Asia and North America. Despite this, a small number of individuals falling into the adult size ranges of other hadrosaurs are indicated by isolated elements, such as femurs. Multiple hypotheses have been put forward to explain this: firstly, juvenile individuals may have been the dominant life stage living in the area where the bonebed was preserved, due to ecological differences over lifespan; secondly, it's possible they represent dwarfed animals dominating the environment relative to rare a larger species; lastly, it's possible the large individuals were comparative giants of a single dwarfed species, near the extreme end of individual variation in the species. The 2015 analysis of hadrosaur dentaries from the Pyrenees found two morphotypes to be present in the bonebed, so they favored the second hypothesis.

The more in-depth 2018 study used histological analysis in order to assess the age of different individuals, using tibiae. Of the several tibiae tested, four (between 390–450 millimetres (15–18 in) long) were identified as juveniles between the ages of one and three based on comparisons to tissue patterns in other ornithopods, and three more were found to likely be juveniles based on similarities to the former four. The eighth (550 millimetres (22 in) long) and ninth (720 millimetres (28 in) long) were found to belong to an early adult and subadult individual respectively. A 720 millimetres (28 in) femur was found to share subadult growth features with the subadult tibia. Three tibiae (550 millimetres (22 in), 600 millimetres (24 in), and around 900 millimetres (35 in) respectively) were found to belong to adult individuals. Growth trajectory was found to be consistent between the tibiae, supporting the idea that the site represents a large variety of age stages of a single species.

== Taxonomic identity ==
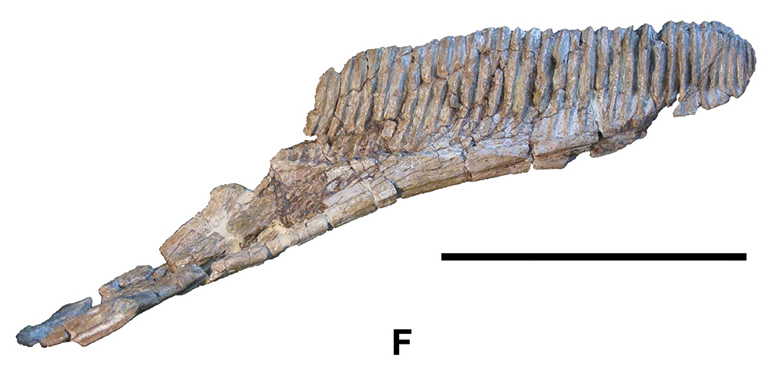
Holotype dentary of "Koutalisaurus kohlerorum", a species the bonebed material was once assigned to

A poster presentation and abstract at a conference suggested the specimens may have belonged to Koutalisaurus kohlerorum, but they cautioned an adult dentary from the bonebed would need to be discovered to test the hypothesis. This was later rejected, as Koutalisaurus was found to be an invalid nomen dubium. Fondevilla et al. (2018) compared to the material from Basturs Poble to recognized species of lambeosaurine from geographically and temporally similar locations in the Pyrenees. The jugals from the sample were found to be distinct from those known from Blasisaurus and Arenysaurus (possible synonyms of Pararhabdodon), and the frontals were also distinguishable from the latter. Identity as specimens as either of those taxa was therefore ruled out. Overlapping taxonomically informative material with Pararhabdodon was not found from the bonebed, excepting a maxilla too fragmentary for use in referral. However, both the type locality of SRA and the locality of the referred maxilla MCD 4919 are close to the area the bonebed was found. As such, it was considered most likely the Basturs Poble hadrosaurs are members of the species P. isonensis, but the poor state of preservation of the only comparable material in the bonebed prevented a secure referral. Later, a 2019 study by Prieto-Márquez et al. described a new genus and species of Spanish lambeosaurine, Adynomosaurus arcanus. They compared the material of their species to that of the bonebed, and though similarities were found, their tooth crowns and ilia had different shapes, and the scapulae from the site lacked the distinct shallow nature that characterizes A. arcanus. Accordingly, they considered it unlikely the bonebed belonged to their species. Additionally, they commented on the lack of tsintaosaurin synapomorphies in the bonebed material and so kept a referral as indeterminate lambeosaurines rather than considering it to represent Pararhabdodon.
