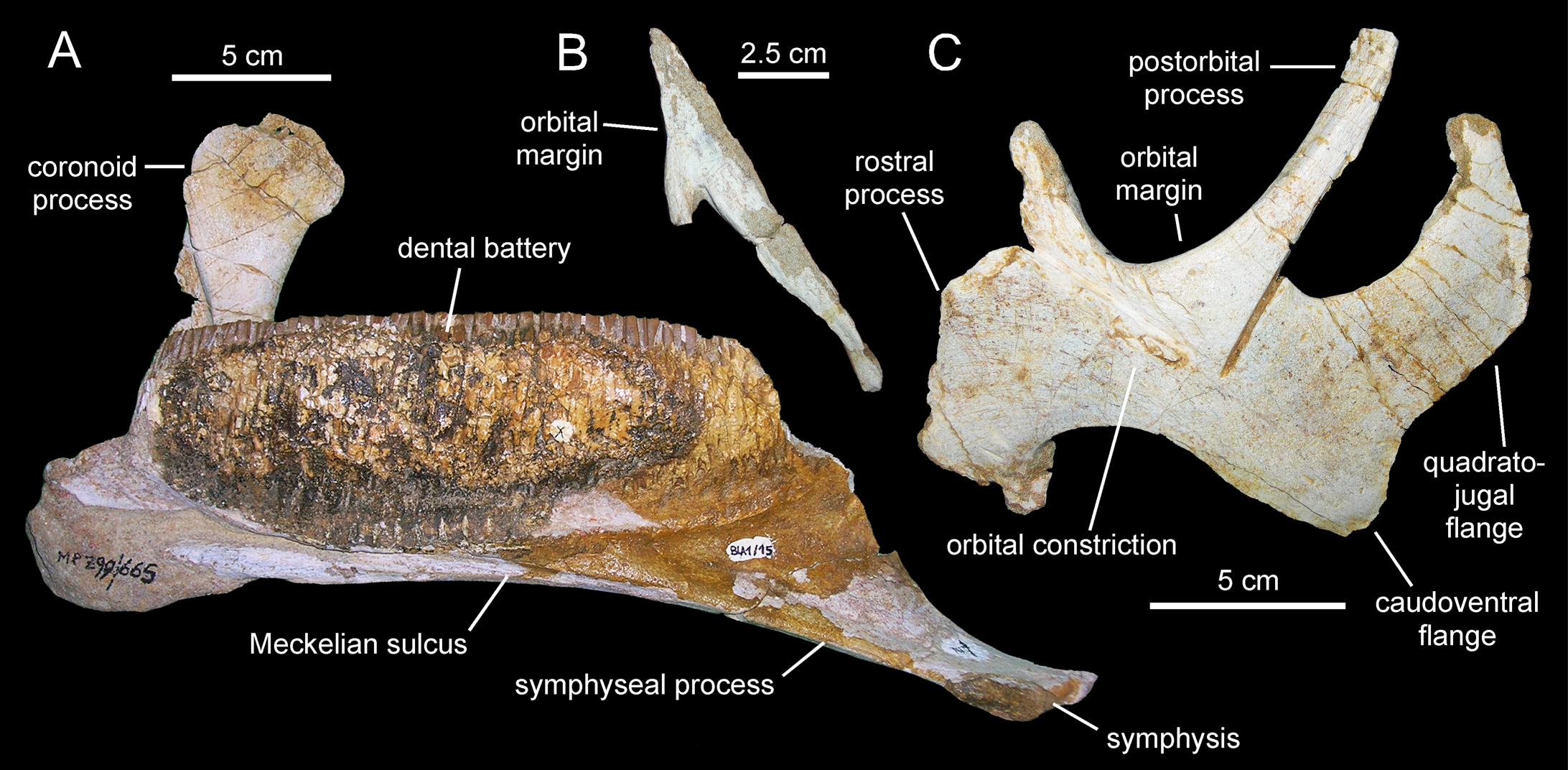
- Skull fossils

Scientific classification
- Kingdom: Animalia
- Phylum: Chordata
- Class: Reptilia
- Clade: Dinosauria
- Clade: †Ornithischia
- Clade: †Ornithopoda
- Family: †Hadrosauridae
- Subfamily: †Lambeosaurinae
- Tribe: †Arenysaurini
- Genus: †Blasisaurus; Cruzado-Caballero et al., 2010

Type species
- †Blasisaurus canudoi Cruzado-Caballero et al., 2010

= Blasisaurus =

Blasisaurus Temporal range: Late Cretaceous, 66 Ma

Extinct genus of dinosaurs

Blasisaurus is a genus of lambeosaurine hadrosaurid dinosaur from the Late Cretaceous. It is known from a partial skull and skeleton found in late Maastrichtian-age rocks of Spain. The type species is Blasisaurus canudoi, described in 2010 by Penélope Cruzado-Caballero, Xabier Pereda-Suberbiola and José Ignacio Ruiz-Omeñaca, a group of researchers from Spain.

== Naming and discovery ==
The generic name refers to the Blasi 1 site where the fossil was found. The specific epithet honours paleontologist José Ignacio Canudo. The holotype, MPZ99/667, is housed in Huesca. It was found in a layer of the Arén Formation dating from the upper Maastrichtian, about 66 million years ago. It consists of a skull with fragmentary lower jaws.

== Description ==
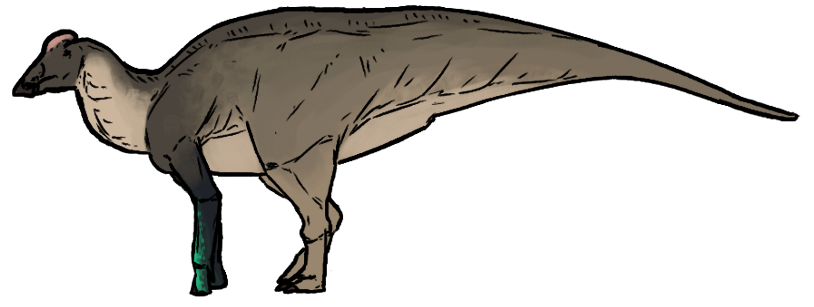
Life restoration

Blasisaurus was a medium-sized ornithopod. Its describers identified two distinct features: the cheekbone has a rear projection with a hook-shaped upper edge and the lower temporal fenestra is narrow and D-shaped. From the same formation is Arenysaurus, a related species. They are distinguished by the shape of the teeth and missing secondary ridges. Blasisaurus also differs from Koutalisaurus by a downward bent front edge of the lower jaw.

== Phylogeny ==
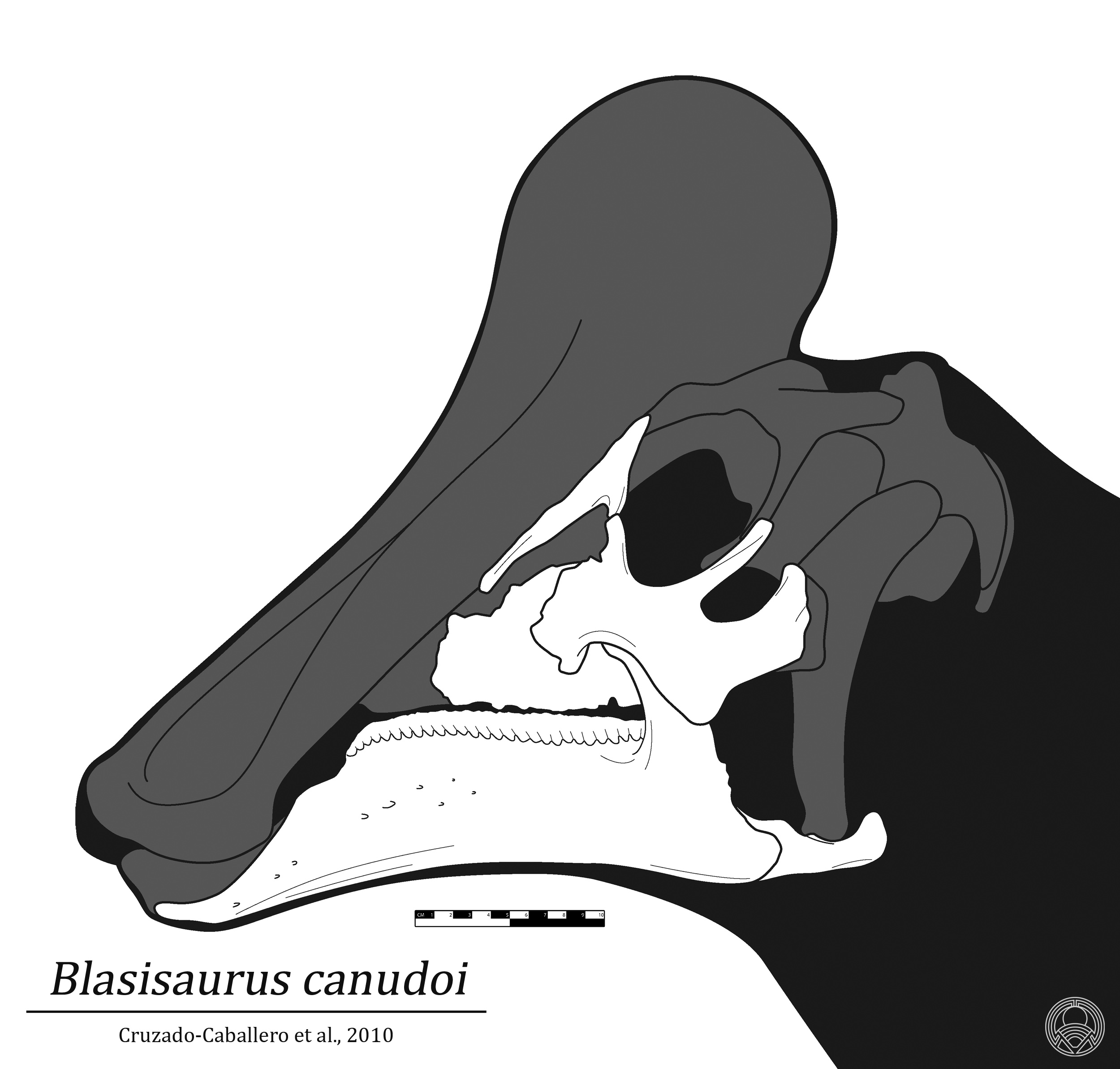
Diagram of skull material

Blasisaurus' discoverers performed an exact cladistic analysis to determine its phylogenetic position, which placed it as the sister taxon to Arenysaurus. Together they form a tribe, the Arenysaurini, that is more derived than Tsintaosaurus and Jaxartosaurus. Blasisaurus confirmed the hypothesis that, in the Late Cretaceous, different hadrosaurids from Asia and Europe migrated across land bridges. Where in Lambeosaurinae Blasisaurus and Arenysaurus belong is disputed. Some put them in the tribe Lambeosaurini at the base of the lambeosaurin-parasaurolophin split, some in Parasaurolophini. Below is the most recent cladogram including Blasisaurus and Arenysaurus, published by Penélope Cruzado-Caballero et al. in 2013:

- Hadrosauridae
  - Gryposaurus notabilis
  - - Aralosaurus tuberiferus
    - Lambeosaurinae
      - - Pararhabdodon isonensis
        - Tsintaosaurus spinorhinus
      - - Jaxartosaurus aralensis
        - - Amurosaurus riabinini
          - - Sahaliyania elunchunorum
            - Parasaurolophini
              - Charonosaurus jiayinensis
              - - - Blasisaurus canudoi
                  - Arenysaurus ardevoli
                - Parasaurolophus
                  - Parasaurolophus cyrtocristatus
                  - - Parasaurolophus tubicen
                    - Parasaurolophus walkeri
            - Lambeosaurini
              - Lambeosaurus
                - Lambeosaurus magnicristatus
                - Lambeosaurus lambei
              - - Velafrons coahuilensis
                - Hypacrosaurus altispinus
                - Hypacrosaurus stebingeri
                - Olorotitan arharensis
                - Corythosaurus casuarius

== See also ==
- Timeline of hadrosaur research
