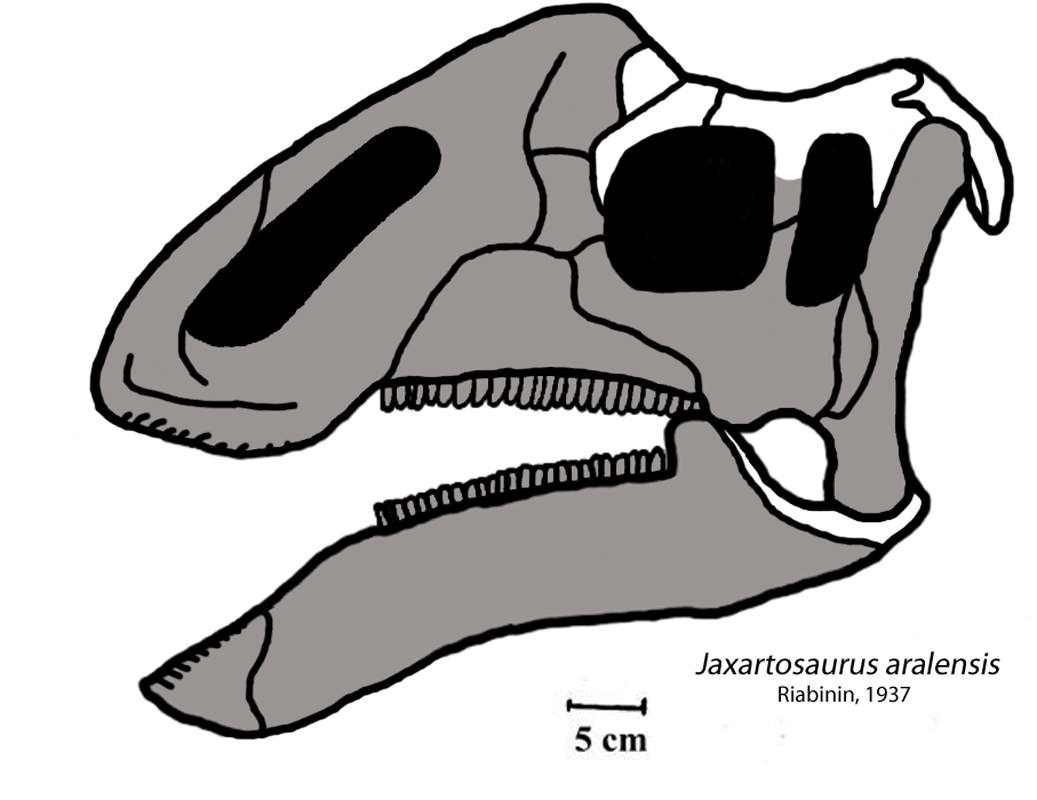
- Reconstructed skull

Scientific classification
- Kingdom: Animalia
- Phylum: Chordata
- Class: Reptilia
- Clade: Dinosauria
- Clade: †Ornithischia
- Clade: †Ornithopoda
- Family: †Hadrosauridae
- Subfamily: †Lambeosaurinae
- Genus: †Jaxartosaurus; Riabinin, 1937

Type species
- †Jaxartosaurus aralensis Riabinin, 1937

Synonyms
- ?Bactrosaurus prynadai Riabinin, 1939

= Jaxartosaurus =

Jaxartosaurus Temporal range: Late Cretaceous, Coniacian–Santonian

Extinct genus of dinosaurs

Jaxartosaurus (meaning "Jaxartes lizard" after the early name of the Syr Darya) is a genus of hadrosaurid dinosaur similar to Corythosaurus which lived during the Late Cretaceous. Its fossils were found in Kazakhstan.

== Discovery ==
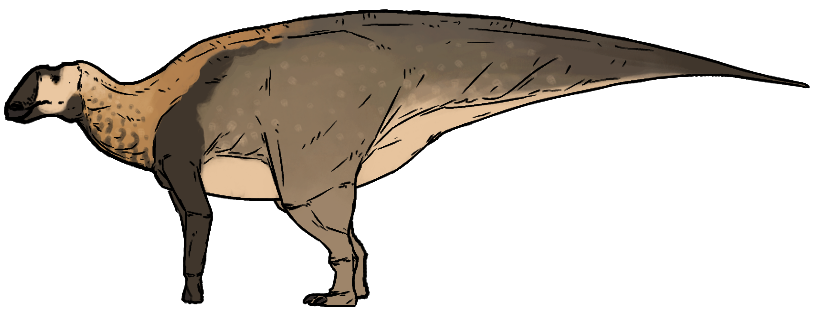
Life restoration

The first dinosaurs were discovered in Kazakhstan in 1923, where they were brought from the South Kazakhstan region and interpreted by Soviet palaeontologist Anatoly Riabinin to be from hadrosaurids as well as theropods. The dinosaur horizon was within a red limestone layer beneath a calcareous red sandstone with abundant petrified wood. Dinosaur bones and teeth could also be found higher up, but were increasingly more fragmentary, with the entire deposit interpreted by Riabinin as Cenomanian in age. From 1924 to 1926, the Soviet Geological Committee sent geologist Vasilij Prynada to excavate the dinosaur horizon near Tashkent, where the most abundant fossils were found within a 20 km (12 mi) stretch along the Alymtau Range near the Kyrk-Kuduk well. From these discoveries, Riabinin informally proposed the new hadrosaurids "Jaxartosaurus aralensis" and "Bactrosaurus prynadai" in 1937 and 1938, before formally describing both new taxa in 1939. The genus name for Jaxartosaurus is derived from the ancient name of the Syr Darya, "Yaxart", while the species name is in reference to the nearby Aral Sea. Riabinin believed that much of the hadrosaurid skeletal material discovered could be considered from a single individual as the syntype of Jaxartosaurus, numtiple specimen numbers within the collection PIN No. 5009, with portions of the skull, vertebrae, forelimb, and hindlimb represented. Based on the skull roof, Riabinin classified Jaxartosaurus as a member of Lambeosaurinae, only the second from Asia after Bactrosaurus in his classification.

Following the description of Riabinin, Soviet palaeontologist Anatoly Rozhdestvensky revisited Jaxartosaurus during his description of other hadrosaurids from Kazakstan in 1968, especially focusing on the diagnostic nature of the partial skull. Rozhdestvensky also believed that Bactrosaurus prynadai could be considered a junior synonym of Jaxartosaurus, from the same locality and included as part of the same collection PIN 5009. From the additional material of hadrosaurids elsewhere in the dinosaur horizon, Rozhdestvensky considered the entire assemblage to be convincingly Cretaceous in age, despite having been suggested to have been Paleogene previously and only containing reworked fossils. Rozhdestvensky extrapolated that the hadrosaurs from Kazakhstan would be from the Turonian to Santonian based on similarities to hadrosaurs from better-constrained deposits, with Jaxartosaurus being slightly younger, dating to the Coniacian to Santonian. Rozhdestvensky designated PIN 1/5009, a partial skull roof, as the lectotype of Jaxartosaurus due to its diagnostic nature, as the collection PIN 5009 included multiple individuals.

A second species, Jaxartosaurus fuyunensis, was described by Wu in 1984 for a partial dentary from Xinjiang, China, but it is dubious.

== Description ==
Jaxartosaurus had a large crest that it may have used for visual identification, or to vocalize with members of the same species, as inferred for other lambeosaurines. They were likely herbivores, grazing on low-lying plants.
