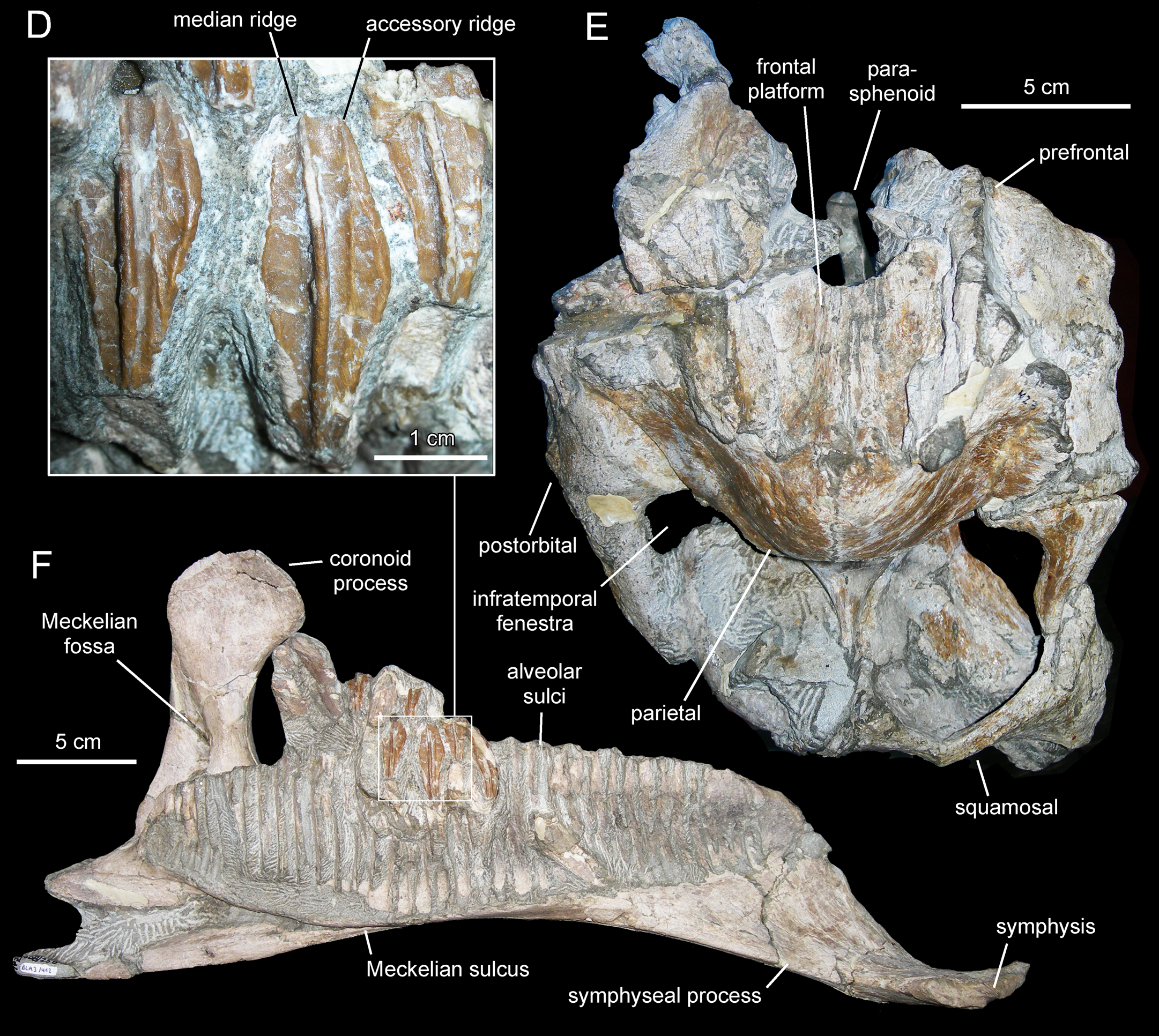
- Skull fossils

Scientific classification
- Kingdom: Animalia
- Phylum: Chordata
- Class: Reptilia
- Clade: Dinosauria
- Clade: †Ornithischia
- Clade: †Ornithopoda
- Family: †Hadrosauridae
- Subfamily: †Lambeosaurinae
- Tribe: †Arenysaurini
- Genus: †Arenysaurus; Pereda-Suberbiola et al., 2009

Type species
- †Arenysaurus ardevoli Pereda-Suberbiola et al., 2009

= Arenysaurus =

Arenysaurus Temporal range: Maastrichtian ~66 Ma

Extinct genus of dinosaurs

Arenysaurus is a genus of hadrosaurid dinosaur from the Late Cretaceous (66 million years ago), being one of the last non-avian dinosaurs and it went extinct during the Cretaceous–Paleogene extinction event. It is known from a partial skull and skeleton found in the late Maastrichtian-age Tremp Formation of the Pyrenees Mountains in Spain. The type species is A. ardevoli, described in 2009 by Pereda-Suberbiola et al., a group of researchers from Spain. The genus name refers to Arén, where it was found, and the specific epithet honours geologist Lluís Ardèvol. Arenysaurus was a lambeosaurine, a member of the hadrosaurid subfamily with hollow and decorative cranial crests. It is one of the most complete and best dated ever found in the Late Cretaceous period.

== Description ==
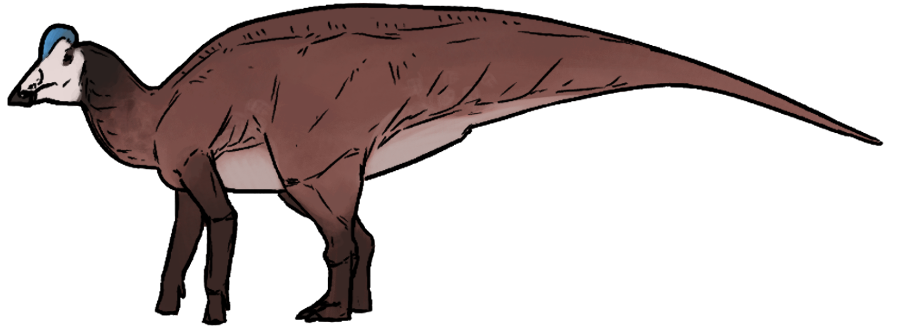
Life restoration

Arenysaurus was a medium-sized hadrosaur, measuring 5–6 metres (16–20 ft) long and weighing 1 metric ton (1.1 short tons). Its fossils were found in a small village (350 inhabitants) in the Aragonese Pyrenees called Arén (Areny in Catalan). The townspeople of Areny worked day and night helping the paleontologists. For this reason the paleontologists dedicated the dig site to Areny. The original bones can be seen in a museum that was built in the town. The museum also houses reconstructions and videos of the dig. An exact replica has been constructed of the bones from where the Arenysaurus fossils were found in the very position which they were found.

== See also ==
- Timeline of hadrosaur research
