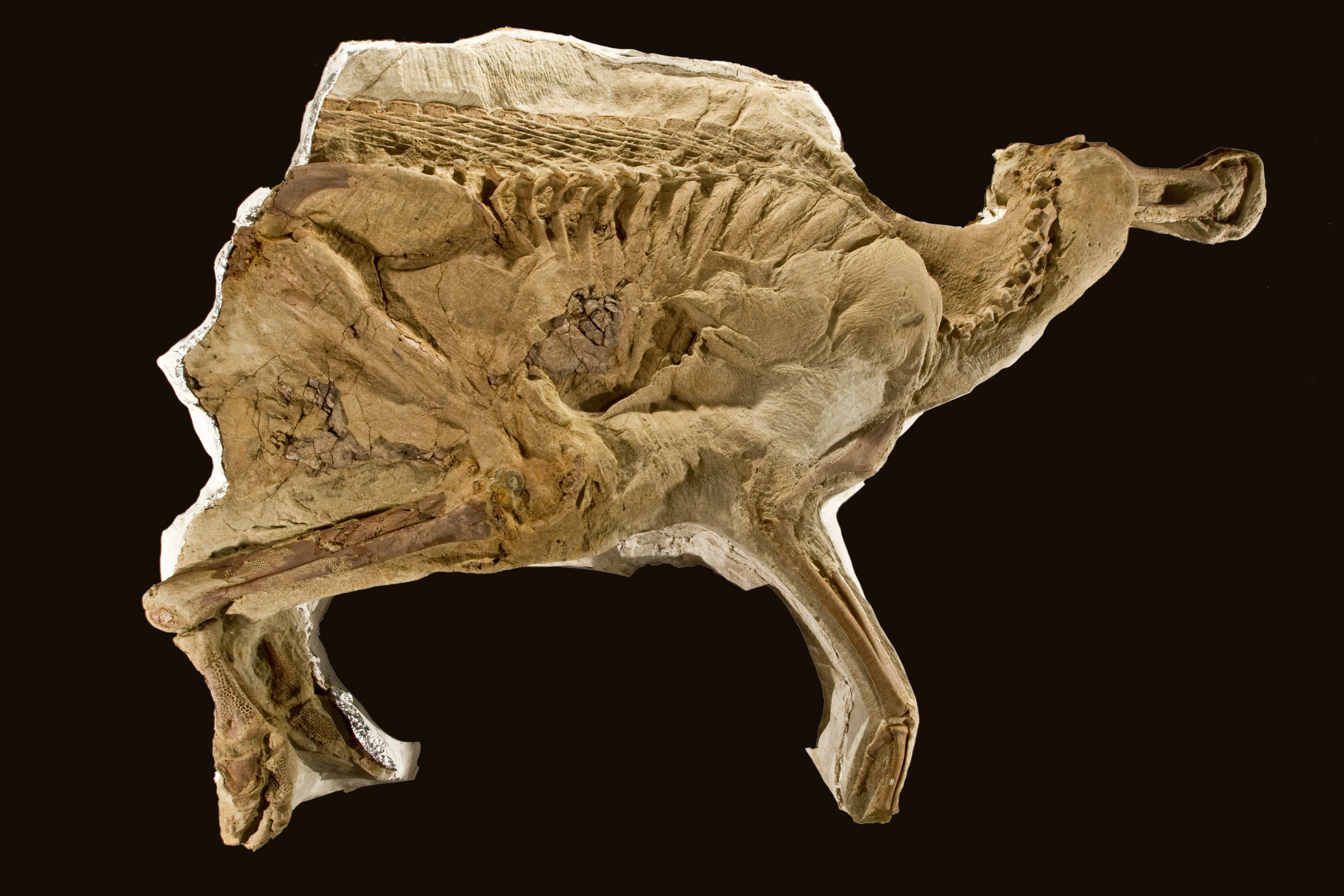
- The mummified specimen "Leonardo" as seen on loan to The Children's Museum of Indianapolis

Scientific classification
- Kingdom: Animalia
- Phylum: Chordata
- Class: Reptilia
- Clade: Dinosauria
- Clade: †Ornithischia
- Clade: †Ornithopoda
- Family: †Hadrosauridae
- Subfamily: †Saurolophinae
- Tribe: †Brachylophosaurini
- Genus: †Brachylophosaurus; Sternberg, 1953

Type species
- †Brachylophosaurus canadensis Sternberg, 1953

Synonyms
- †Brachylophosaurus goodwini? Horner, 1988

= Brachylophosaurus =

Brachylophosaurus Temporal range: Late Cretaceous, 78.5–77.6 Ma

Extinct genus of hadrosaurid

Brachylophosaurus (/brəˌkɪləfəˈsɔːrəs/ brə-KIL-ə-fə-SOR-əs or /ˌbrækiˌloʊfəˈsɔːrəs/ brak-i-LOH-fə-SOR-əs) is a genus of hadrosaurid dinosaur that lived during the Late Cretaceous period of western North America. It was first named in 1953 by Charles Mortram Sternberg for a skull and skeleton he discovered in 1936 in the Oldman Formation of Alberta, Canada, for which he named the new taxon Brachylophosaurus canadensis. While this single specimen was the only known material of Brachylophosaurus for a long time, extensive discoveries in the Judith River Formation of Montana, USA have uncovered not only additional skulls and skeletons with extensive impressions of skin, but also a bonebed of 800 specimens. The earliest of these discoveries in Montana was named Brachylophosaurus goodwini by John R. Horner, but it is now believed that there was only a single species of Brachylophosaurus, with B. goodwini as either a junior synonym of B. canadensis or an indeterminate member of Brachylophosaurini.

== Discovery and species ==
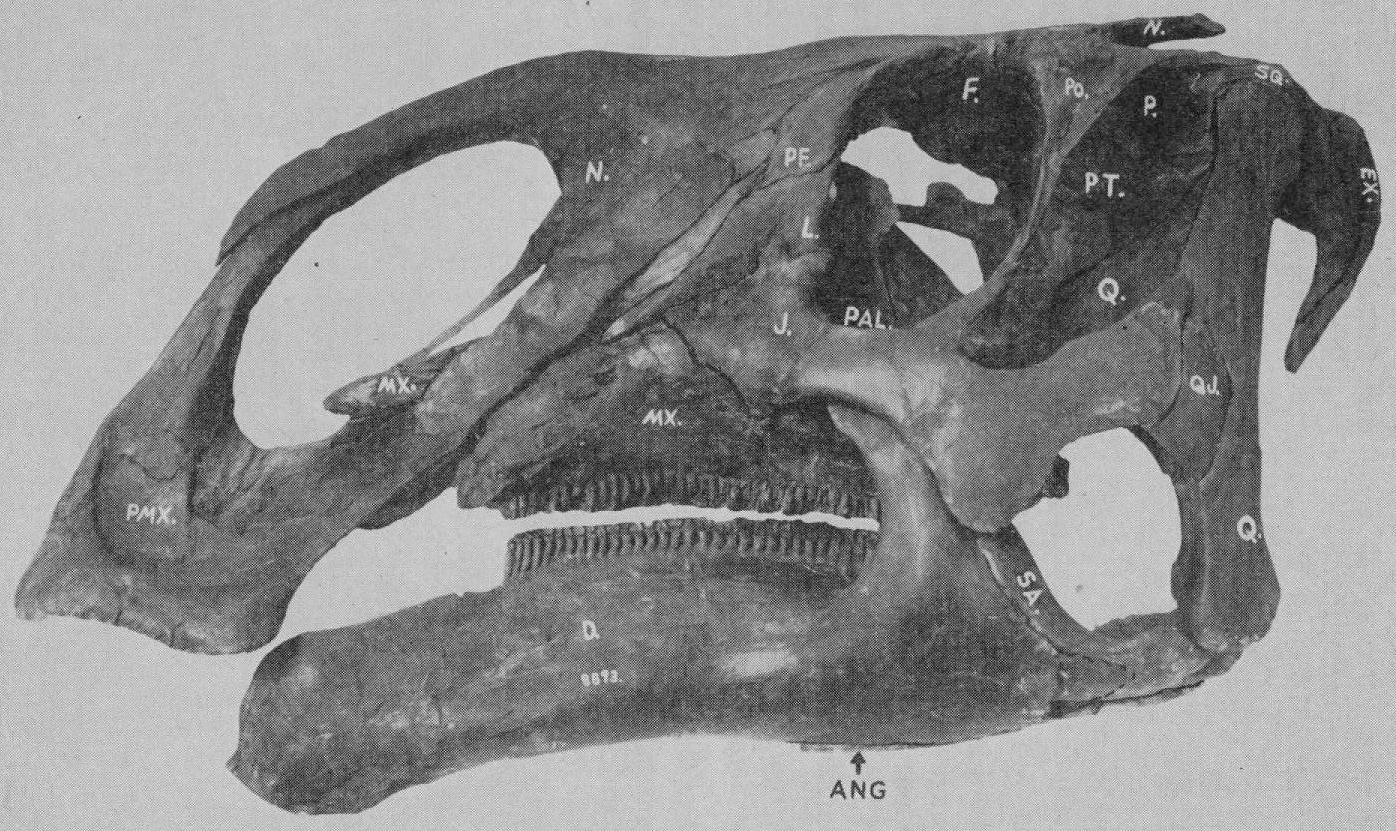
Type skull of Brachylophosaurus CMN 8893

In 1936, American paleontologist Charles Mortram Sternberg led an expedition of the Geological Survey of Canada to the region of Dinosaur Provincial Park, Alberta, collecting multiple specimens for the Canadian Museum of Nature including a skull and partial skeleton of a hadrosaur (CMN 8893). This specimen was found in a thin sandstone bed of the Oldman Formation 0.5 mi (0.80 km) above the mouth of Little Sandhill Creek on the Red Deer River, 60 ft (18 m) above the water level. Sternberg labelled this quarry, near Steveville, Alberta, as quarry No. 58, and though he marked it with a stake and identified it on a map, it was lost for more than 20 years as the back wall had collapsed and buried the marker, only being rediscovered in 2001 and officially designated Q103. When first collected, Sternberg believed that CMN 8893 represented a new species of the hadrosaur Gryposaurus, but additional study led to his reinterpretation of the specimen as quite distinct and in need of a new genus, superficially similar to Gryposaurus and Kritosaurus but likely closer to Saurolophus. As such, in 1953 Sternberg named CMN 8893 Brachylophosaurus canadensis, identifying it as a relative of all aforementioned hadrosaurs within the subfamily Hadrosaurinae. The genus name comes from the Ancient Greek words βραχύς (brakhús), meaning "short", λόφος (lóphos), meaning "crest", and σαῦρος (saûros), meaning "lizard".

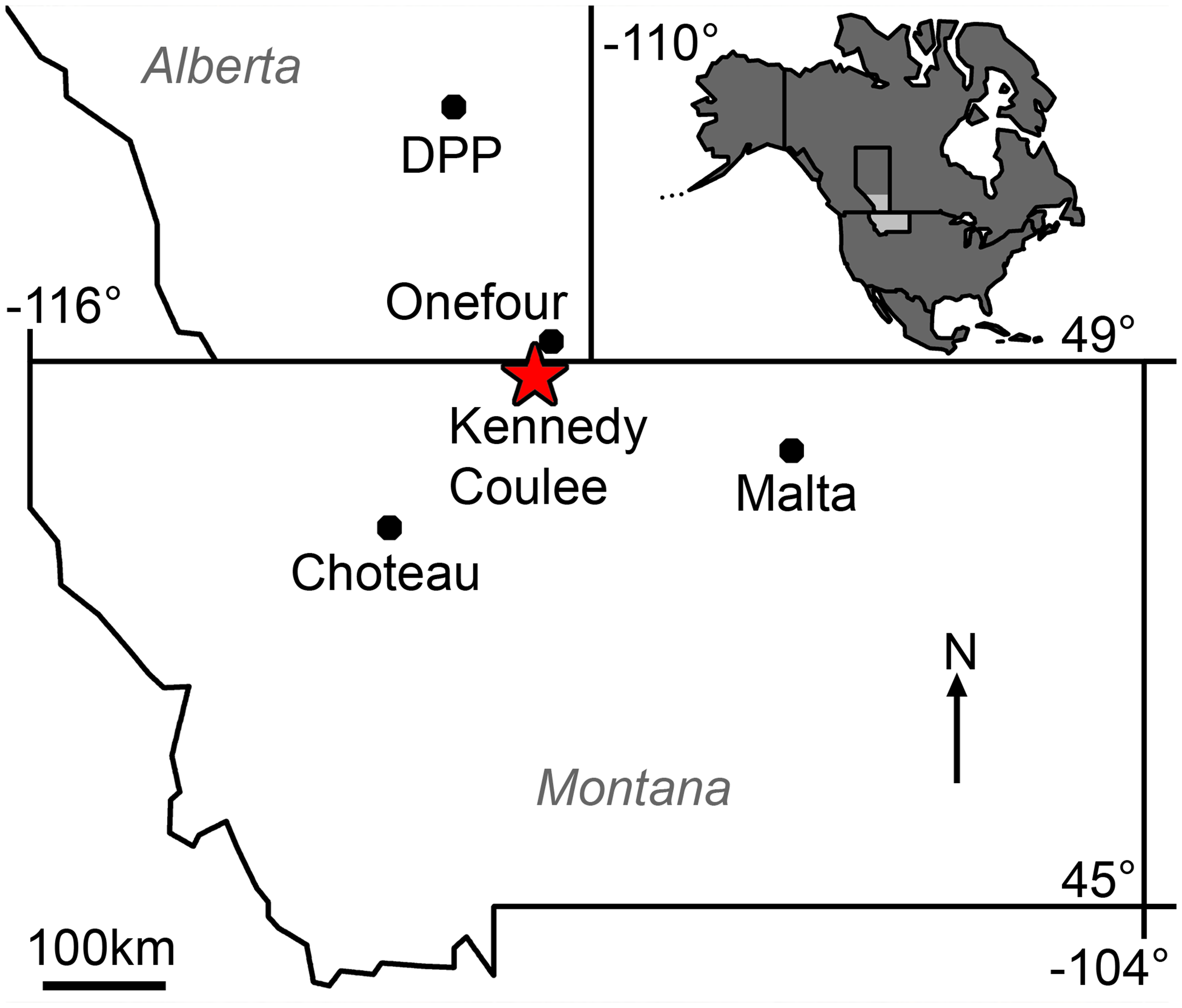
Map of Brachylophosaurini (Saurolophinae) specimen discoveries in Alberta and Montana. Remains of Brachylophosaurus have been found close to Malta, visible on the map.

A second species of Brachylophosaurus was named in 1998 by American paleontologist John R. Horner, for a specimen found in the Judith River Formation of Montana. This specimen (UCMP 130139) was discovered in 1981 and collected in 1982 by Mark Goodwin as part of the explorations of the University of California, Berkeley, and is one of the few dinosaurs specimens from the Judith River as of 1988 that included more than just isolated elements, with a partial skull, forelimb, and some vertebrae represented. Horner named it Brachylophosaurus goodwini in honor of Goodwin, separating it from B. canadensis by multiple features of the skull, and also recognizing that it may eventually be identified as a new genus. Horner also published for the first time the presence of a third specimen as Brachylophosaurus, FMNH PR 862.

FMNH PR 862 was found on September 9, 1922 by George Fryer Sternberg, brother of Charles M. Sternberg, as part of the 1922 expedition of the Field Museum of Natural History to the Red Deer River area under American paleontologist Elmer S. Riggs. It was found within a brown sandstone on the east side of Little Sandhill Creek around 1 mi (1.6 km) from the mouth and 80 ft (24 m) above the water level. George Sternberg described it in some detail in his notes, identifying the known bones of the disarticulated skull and labelling it as an entirely new type of crested hadrosaur. This identification was validated by its later referral to Brachylophosaurus, which had not been named at the time of Sternberg's discovery. It was uncatalogued at the Field Museum until 1972 when it received the number FMNH PR 862, and though it was identified as material of Brachylophosaurus by American paleontologist James A. Hopson before being loaned to David B. Weishampel from 1980 to 2006, it was Horner's 1988 paper that first published the identification.

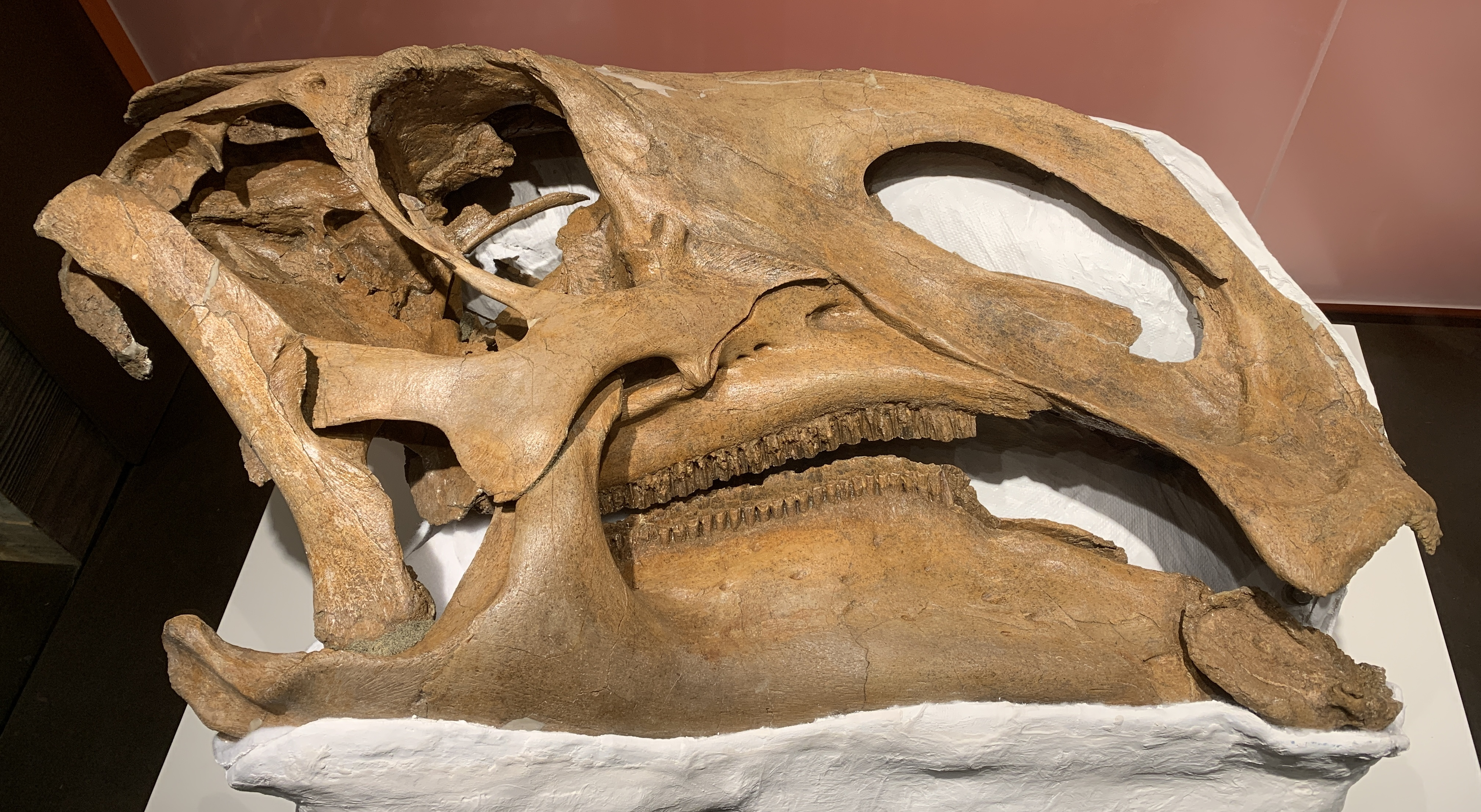
Skull of Brachylophosaurus TMP 1990.104.01

Within Dinosaur Provincial Park, Brachylophosaurus remains known from a single relatively complete skeleton, that of the type CMN 8893. However, a second well-preserved specimen has been found in southern Alberta in the area of Manyberries and Onefour, collected by the Royal Tyrrell Museum of Paleontology as TMP 1990.104.1. It remains undescribed apart from comparisons of its stomach contents and skeleton to CMN 8893, but preserves the front half of a skeleton and a complete skull. An additional specimen from Alberta, from the same levels of the Oldman Formation as Brachylophosaurus, has instead been identified as belonging to its close relative Maiasaura, showing the first coexistence between Brachylophosaurus and another hadrosaurine in the Oldman Formation. A single maxilla from the upper Wahweap Formation of Utah has been tentatively attributed to Brachylophosaurus based on greater similarity than other hadrosaurines, and its equivalent age to material from Judith River.

=== Montana bonebed and dinosaur mummies ===
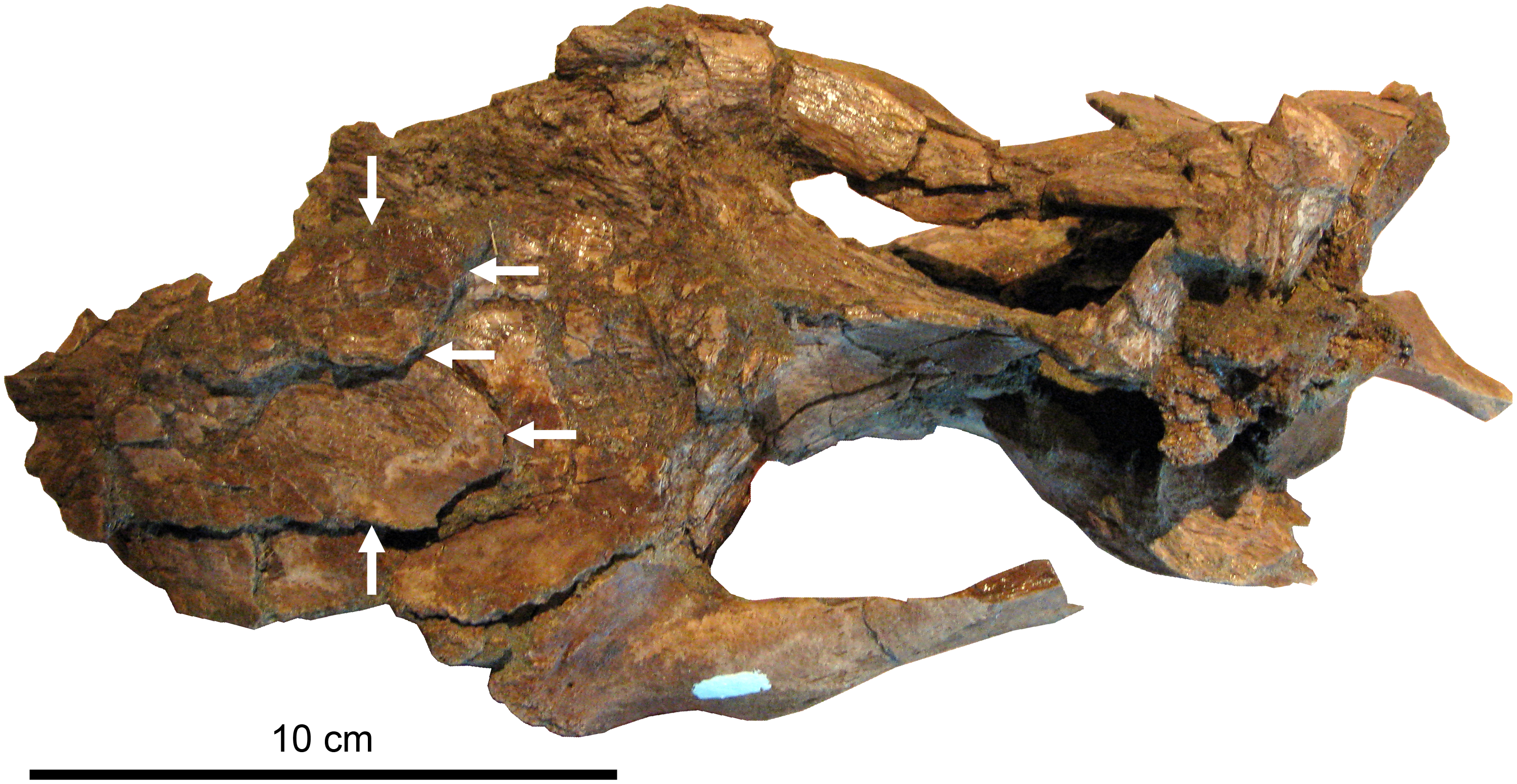
Specimen MOR 940 seen from above

In the lower Judith River Formation, excavations of the Museum of the Rockies in the mid-1990s uncovered a nearly complete and articulated skeleton in isolation, as well as an extensive bonebed containing hundreds of bones from individuals of all ages. The completeness of this new material allowed for Spanish paleontologist Alberto Prieto-Márquez to redescribe Brachylophosaurus in 2005. The individual skeleton (MOR 794) and bonebed (MOR 1071) are from stratigraphically equivalent sites 17 mi (27 km) north of Malta, Montana, and 54 mi (87 km) south of the Canadian border. MOR 794 was discovered in 1994 by fossil collector Nate Murphy on a hillside 15 mi (24 km) north of Malta, preserved in three dimensions without any flattening. The entire skeleton and skull is articulated with only the very end of the tail missing, making it about 95% complete. It was given the nickname "Elvis", and is stored at both the Museum of the Rockies and the Phillips County Museum where it is on display. From this new material, Prieto-Márquez was able to support a close relationship between Brachylophosaurus and Maiasaura, as well as synonymize B. goodwini and B. canadensis, reducing Brachylophosaurus to a single species. The synonymy of B. goodwini is not unanimous however, as because it lacks the diagnostic nasal crest, it cannot be compared easily with taxa such as Probrachylophosaurus and may be more appropriately considered a dubious member of Brachylophosaurini rather than a synonym of Brachylophosaurus.

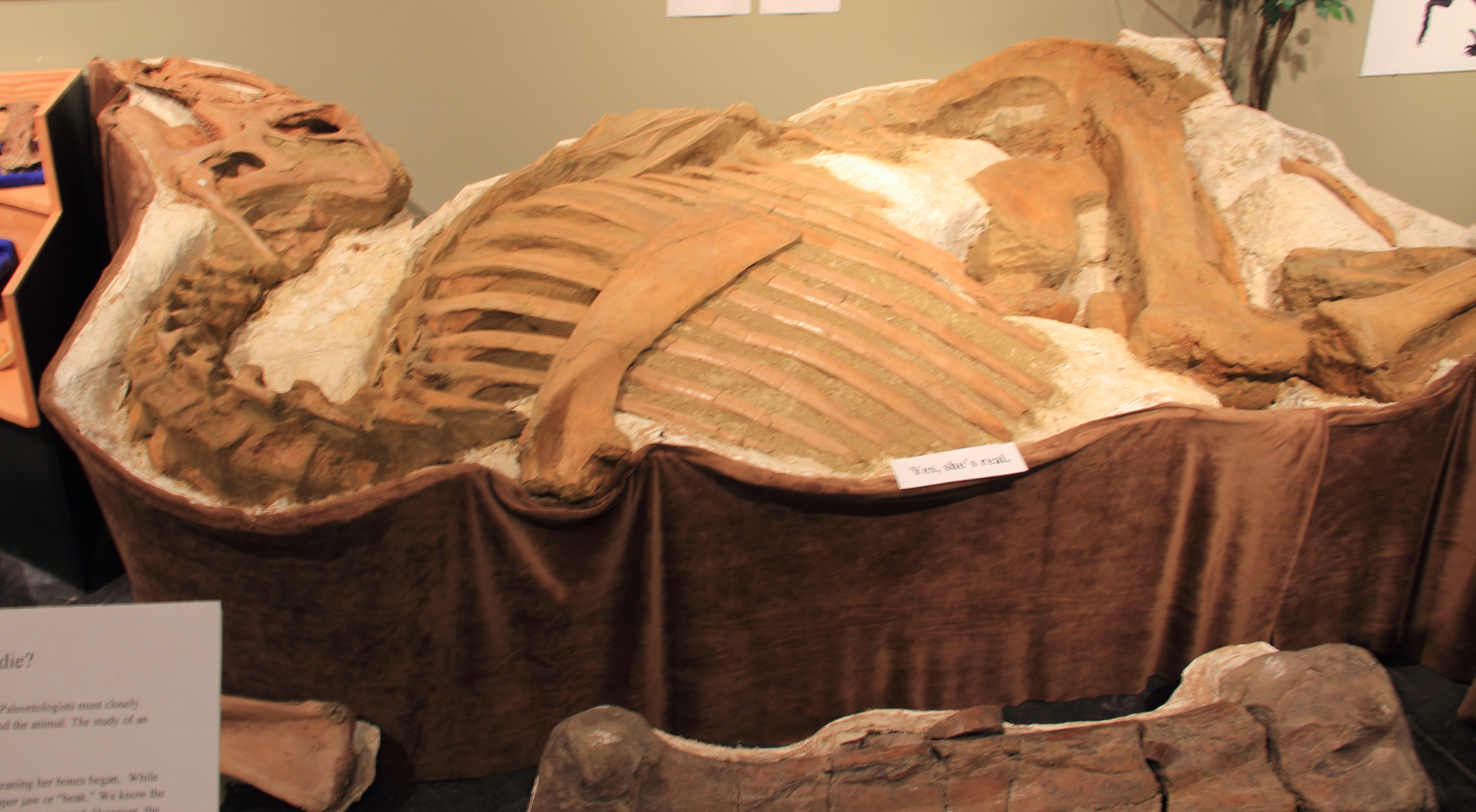
Fossil nicknamed Roberta

Another specimen of Brachylophosaurus was discovered during an expedition led by Murphy in 2000, and given the nickname "Leonardo". On July 20, 2000, a volunteer of the Judith River Dinosaur Institute located a partially exposed pelvis in northern Phillips County, Montana, which was then excavated in 2001. Nearly the entire body was covered in impressions of skin, complicating excavation but resulting in one of the best-preserved mummified dinosaur specimens. It was given the collection number JRF 115, and is part of the collections of the Great Plains Dinosaur Museum in Malta. The preservation resulted in Guiness Book of World Records identifying "Leonardo" as the "Best Preserved Dinosaur", and the creation of a documentary by the Discovery Channel on the specimen, called "Secrets of the Dinosaur Mummy".

Subsequent excavations uncovered "Roberta", an almost complete gracile skeleton, and "Peanut", a partially preserved juvenile with some skin impressions. "Peanut" was discovered in 2002 by Robert E. Buresh and Andrew Kantor while part of a summer dinosaur dig run by the institute; it is on display at the Institute in Malta, MT. In May 2008, Steven Cowan, public-relations coordinator at the Houston Museum of Natural Science, discovered a Brachylophosaurus skeleton subsequently dubbed "Marco" from the same area as Leonardo.

== Description ==
=== Size and general build ===
Size comparison

Brachylophosaurus is notable for its bony crest, which forms a horizontally flat, paddle-like plate over the top of the rear skull. Some, depending on their age, had crests that covered nearly the entire skull roof, while others had shorter, narrower crests. Some researchers suggest it was used for pushing contests, but it may not have been strong enough for this. Other notable features are a relatively small head, the unusually long lower arms and the beak of the upper jaw being wider than other hadrosaurs of that time.

Apart from the above, Brachylophosaurus was a typical hadrosaur which reached an adult length of at least 9 metres (30 ft). In 2010, Gregory S. Paul estimated maximum length at 11 metres (36 ft) resulting in weight of 7 metric tons (7.7 short tons). Like other hadrosaurs, Brachylophosaurus had features like cheeks to keep fodder in the mouth and dental batteries with hundreds of stacked teeth. These teeth could be used to chew efficiently, a feature rare among reptiles, but common among some cerapodan ornithischian dinosaurs like Brachylophosaurus.

=== Distinguishing traits ===
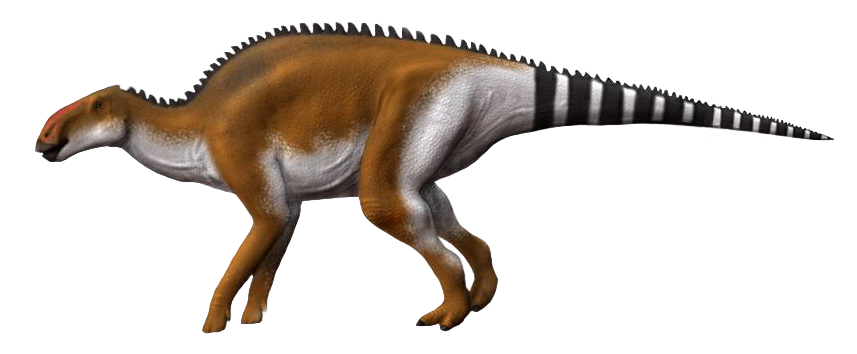
Restoration

In 2015, Jack Horner established some distinguishing traits. Two of these are autapomorphies, unique derived characters. The crest formed by the nasal bones is flat and paddle-shaped in adult individuals and largely or totally overhangs the supratemporal fenestrae. The rear edge of the prefrontal bone overgrowths the frontal bone and more to the rear is oriented inwards and downwards to support the base of the crest and contribute to the edge of the supratemporal fenestra. Additionally, there is one trait that is not unique in itself but forms a unique combination with the two autapomorphies: the front branch of the lacrimal bone is extremely elongated and with its tip only touches the maxillary bone.

=== Skeleton ===
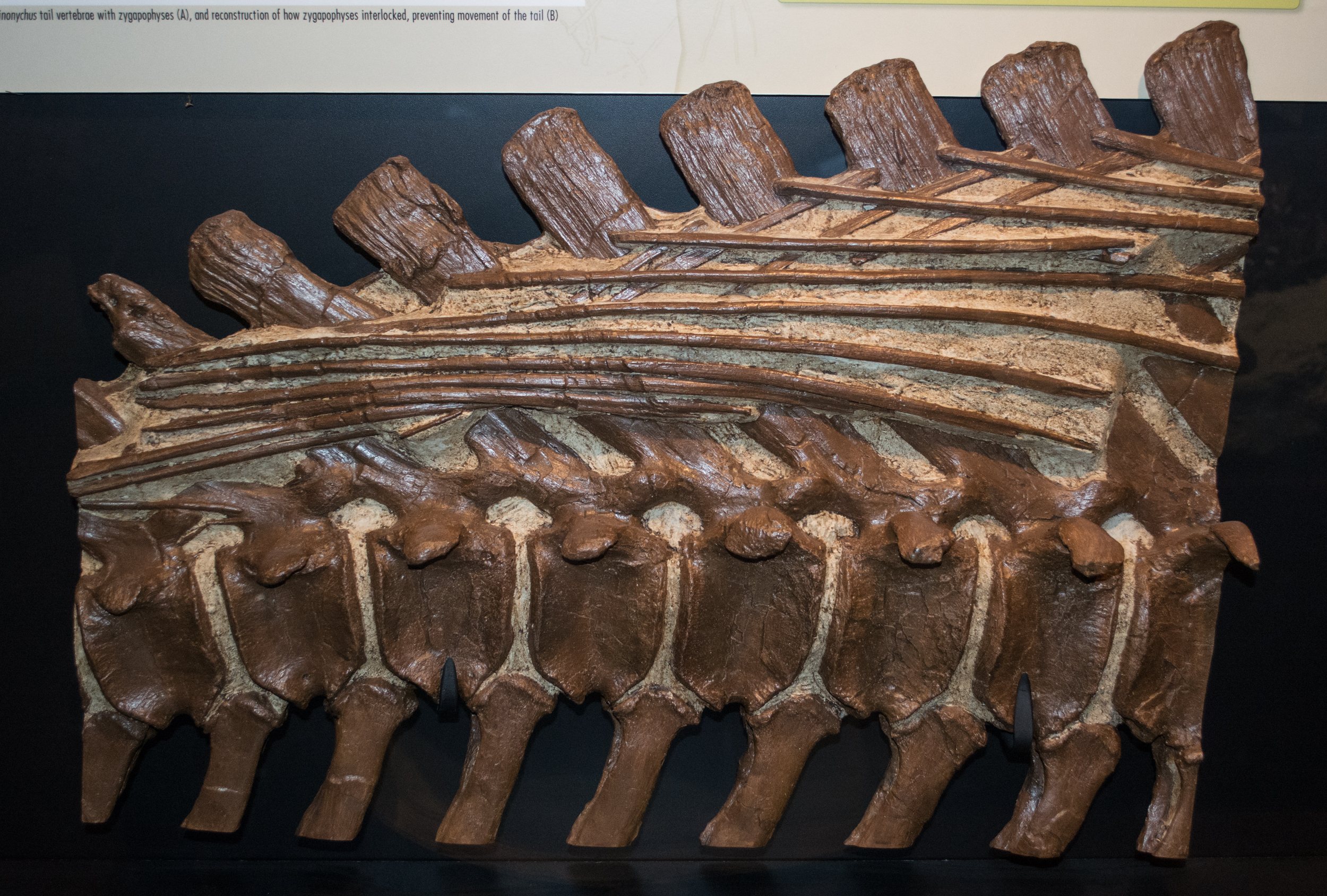
Partial tail with tendons

The head of Brachylophosaurus is elongated. It is wide at the rear and very narrow along most of the length of the snout. The upper beak however, abruptly widens at its rear edge, forming a broad bone core for a horn sheath. The nostrils are extremely large and between them the nasal bones form a narrow tall bone wall on top of much of the snout. More to behind the nasal bones stretch out horizontally, creating a flat tongue-shaped skull crest that overgrowths and ultimately overhangs, most of the skull roof. The crest is not hollow but consists of massive bone. The crest has a low longitudinal ridge on the midline.

The maxilla, the tooth-bearing upper jaw bone, is rather elongated in front. Its tooth positions increase during the lifetime of the animal, ranging from thirty-three in younger individuals to forty-eight in the holotype specimen. The teeth are stacked in a tooth battery, with up to three teeth per position. The battery forms a sharp cutting edge, bending inwards, with one or sometimes two teeth per position contributing to the attrition surface. More to behind, the lower jugal bones and quadrate bones flare out sidewards, so that the skull is much wider at its rear lower edges than at the top surface, resulting in a trapezium-shaped profile in posterior view.

=== Soft tissues ===
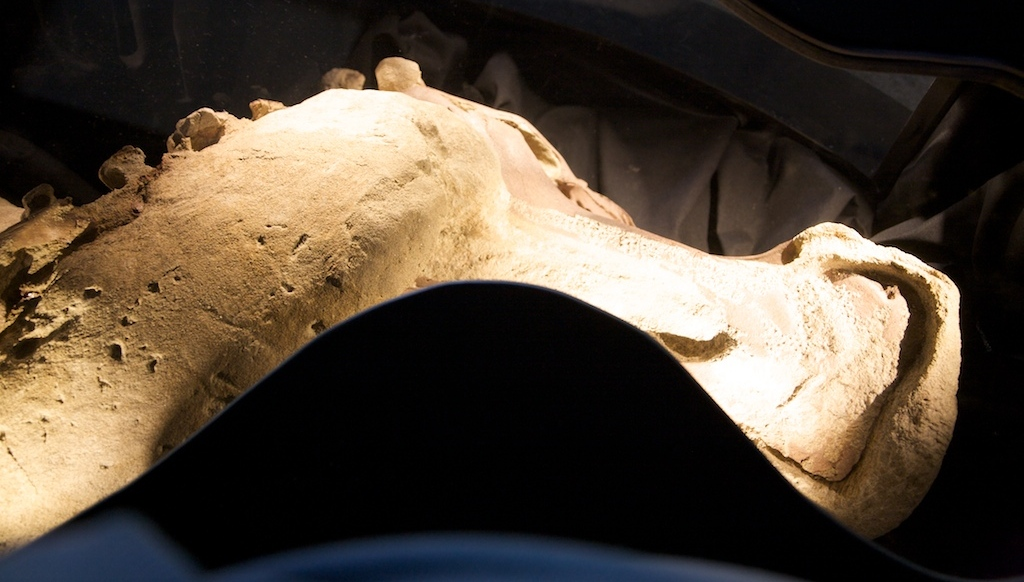
Underside of "Leonardo"'s head and neck, showing skin impressions

Several so-called "mummies" provide information about the soft tissues of Brachylophosaurus. These "mummies" actually consist of natural casts formed in moulds in the stone matrix surrounding the skeleton, preserving the outline of the body and showing skin imprints. The best studied "mummy" has been "Leonardo", a specimen 90% of the cast surface of which is covered by imprints. Generally, the surface is close to the bones, which could be caused by desiccation before burial or the compressive action of the covering sediment. An exception is the region around the right shoulder, which shows the profile of about six centimetres thick muscles. "Leonardo" also indicates that the base of the neck was heavily muscled and that the soft tissue upper neck profile was placed in an elevated position, running much higher than was usually reconstructed in drawings which tended to follow the curvature of the vertebral column, and filling much of the bend between the front back and the head.

On the snout, the remains of a broad keratinous beak are visible. The skin impressions show many folds and a structure of small polygonal basement scales. On the back, a midline row of triangular or hatchet-shaped feature scales is present. These seem to be individually separated and are placed as extensions of each neural spine of the vertebral column. The second, third and fourth finger of the hand are contained in a shared soft tissue "mitten".

Examination of the stomach of "Leonardo" also reveals that the dinosaur was parasitized by small, needle-like worms covered in fine bristles. The discovery indicates that other dinosaur species might have been hosts of similar parasites.

== Classification ==
The following cladogram of hadrosaurid relationships was published in 2013 by Alberto Prieto-Márquez et al.:

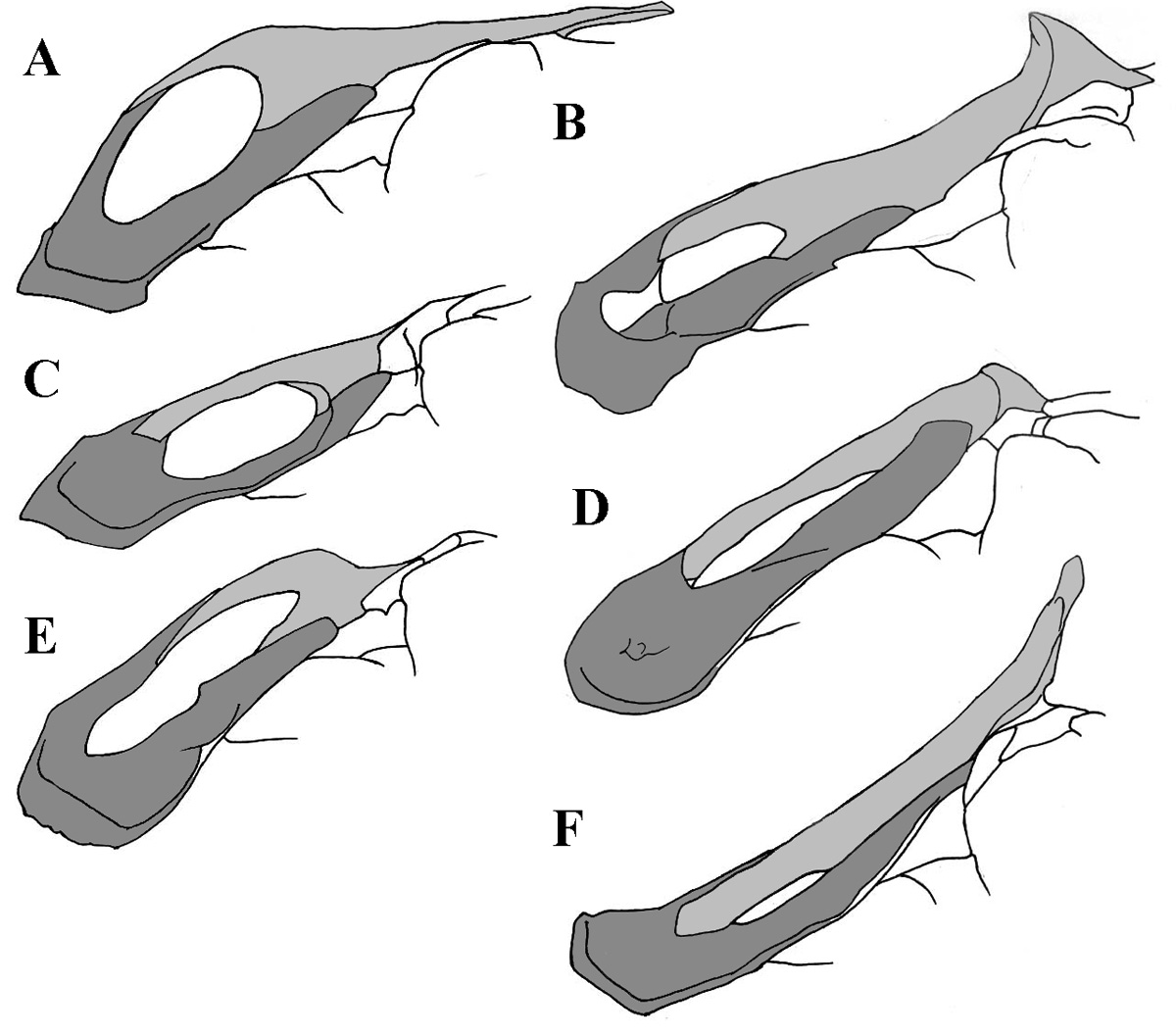
Premaxilla (A), compared to that of other saurolophines

- Saurolophinae
  - Brachylophosaurini
    - Acristravus gagstarsoni
    - - Brachylophosaurus canadensis
      - Maiasaura peeblesorum
  - - Shantungosaurus giganteus
    - - Edmontosaurus
        - Edmontosaurus regalis
        - Edmontosaurus annectens
      - - Saurolophini
          - Kerberosaurus manakini
          - - Sabinas OTU
            - - Prosaurolophus maximus
              - Saurolophus
                - Saurolophus morrisi
                - - Saurolophus osborni
                  - Saurolophus angustirostris
        - Kritosaurini
          - Wulagasaurus dongi
          - - Kritosaurus navajovius
            - - - Aquilarhinus
                - - Secernosaurus koerneri
                  - Willinakaqe salitralensis
              - Gryposaurus
                - Gryposaurus latidens
                - - Gryposaurus notabilis
                  - Gryposaurus monumentensis

== Paleobiology ==
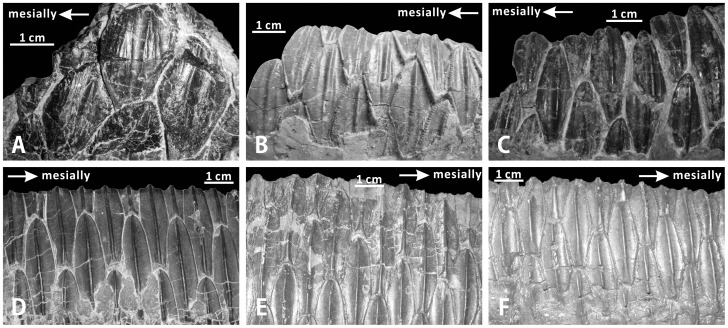
Teeth (F)

In 2003, evidence of tumors, including hemangiomas, desmoplastic fibroma, metastatic cancer, and osteoblastoma was discovered in fossilized Brachylophosaurus skeletons. Rothschild et al. tested dinosaur vertebrae for tumors using computerized tomography and fluoroscope screening. Several other hadrosaurids, including Edmontosaurus, Gilmoreosaurus, and Bactrosaurus, also tested positive. Although more than 10,000 fossils were examined in this manner, the tumors were limited to Brachylophosaurus and closely related genera. The tumors may have been caused by environmental factors or genetic propensity.

=== Diet ===
A 2008 study conducted on the famous dinosaur mummy Leonardo found that Brachylophosaurus had a diet that consisted of leaves, conifers, ferns, algae, liverworts, and flowering plants like magnolias. The study also found that Brachylophosaurus was a generalist herbivore; being both a browser and a grazer, but it did more of the former rather than the latter due to the contents found in its stomach.

== Paleoecology ==
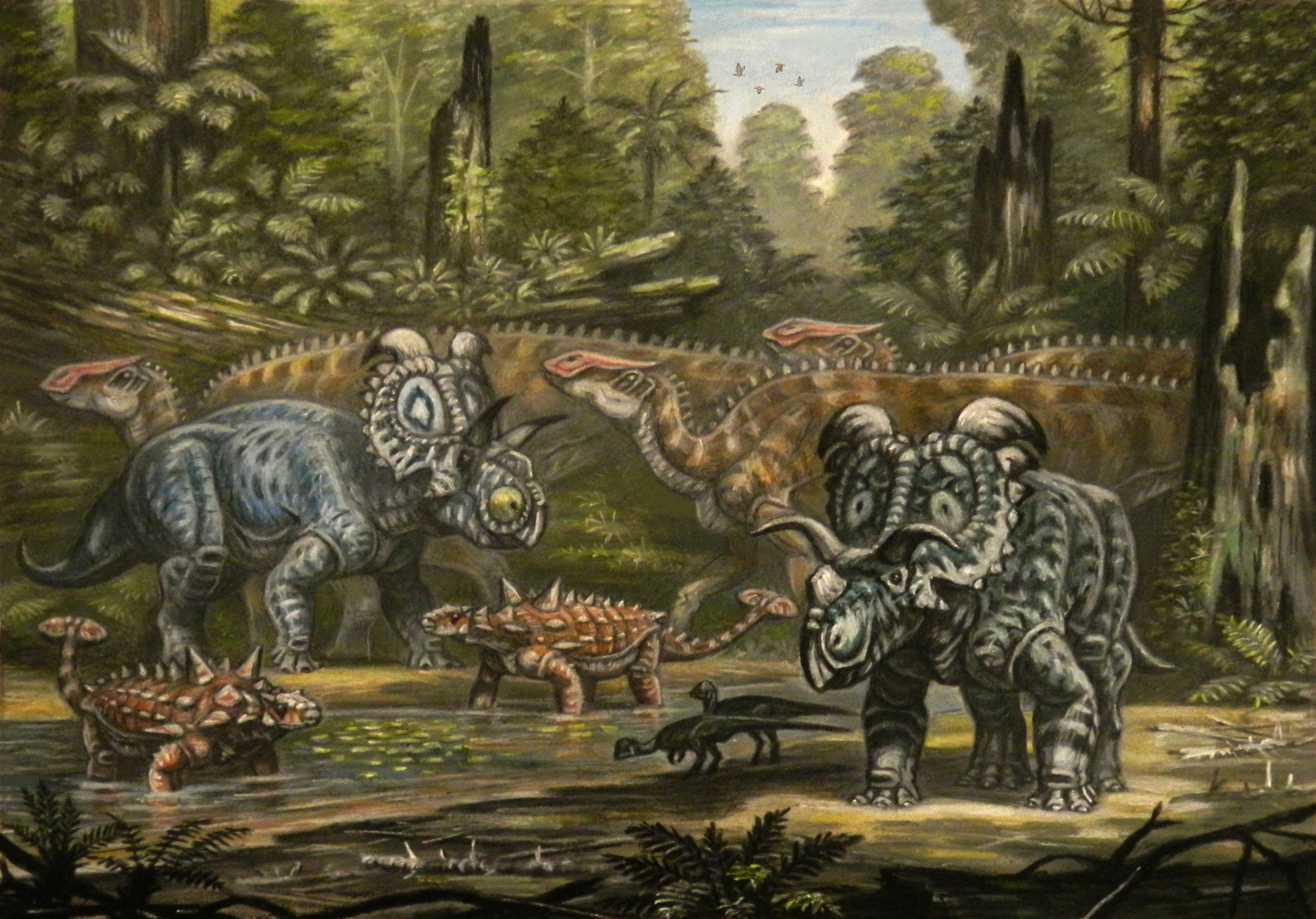
Reconstruction of Brachylophosaurus and other dinosaurs of the Judith River Formation

Some of the less common hadrosaurs in the Dinosaur Park Formation of Dinosaur Provincial Park like Brachylophosaurus may represent the remains of individuals who died while migrating through the region. They might also have had a more upland habitat where they may have nested or fed.
