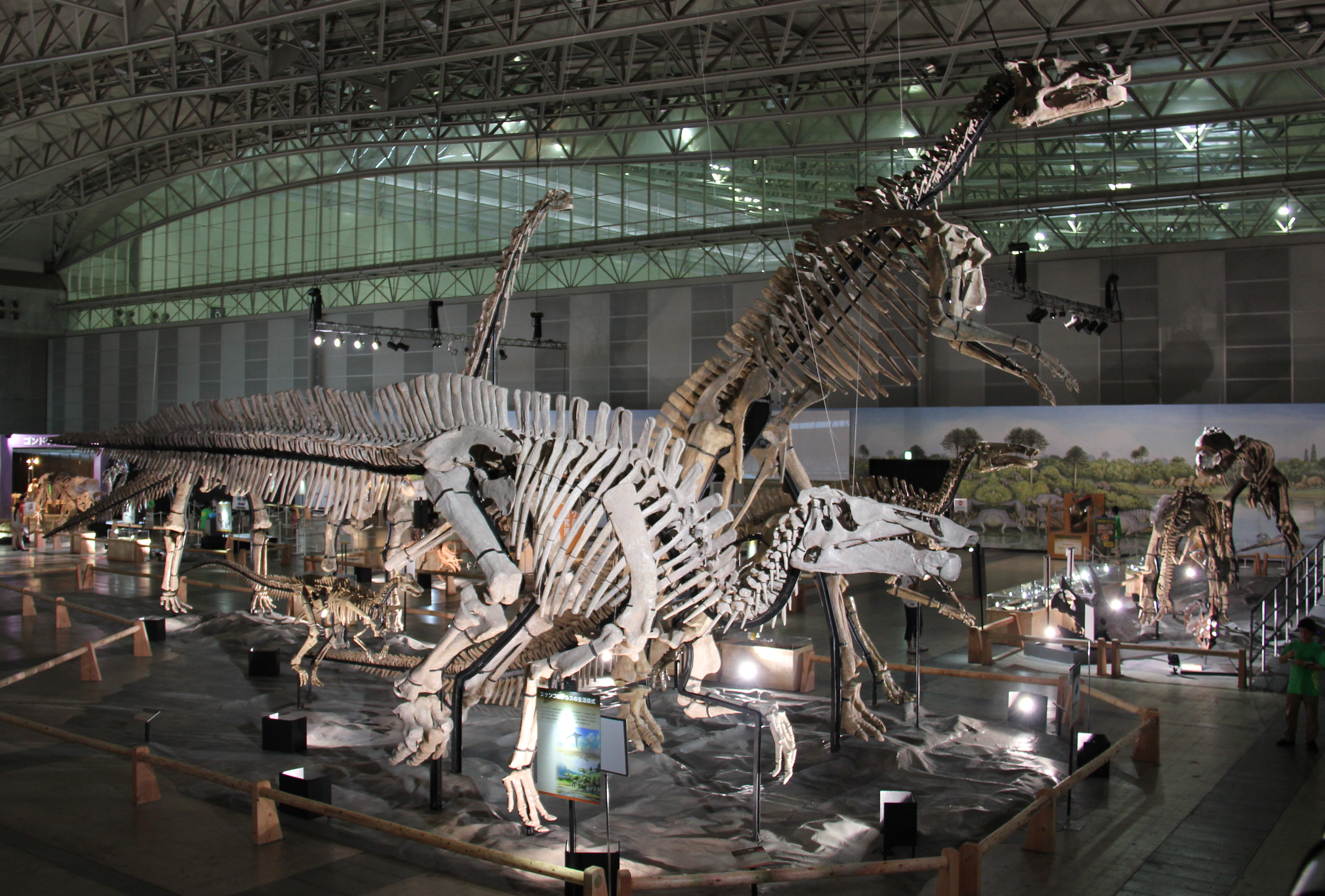
- Restored skeletons

Scientific classification
- Kingdom: Animalia
- Phylum: Chordata
- Class: Reptilia
- Clade: Dinosauria
- Clade: †Ornithischia
- Clade: †Ornithopoda
- Family: †Hadrosauridae
- Subfamily: †Saurolophinae
- Tribe: †Edmontosaurini
- Genus: †Shantungosaurus; Hu, 1973
- Species: †S. giganteus

Binomial name
- †Shantungosaurus giganteus Hu, 1973

Synonyms
- Zhuchengosaurus maximus Zhao et al., 2007; Huaxiaosaurus aigahtens Zhao et al., 2011

= Shantungosaurus =

Shantungosaurus Temporal range: Late Cretaceous, ~77.3–71 Ma

Genus of ornithopod dinosaurs

Shantungosaurus (lit. 'Shandong Lizard') is an extinct genus of very large herbivorous saurolophine hadrosaurid dinosaur found in the Late Cretaceous Wangshi Group of the Shandong Peninsula in China, containing a single species, Shantungosaurus giganteus. The stratigraphic interval of Shantungosaurus ranges from the top of the Xingezhuang Formation to the middle of the Hongtuya Formation, middle to late Campanian in age. There are possible records from the Maastrichtian, although these are uncertain. Shantungosaurus is so far the largest hadrosauroid taxon in the world, with size estimates around 15–17 metres (49–56 ft) in length and 13–16 metric tons (14–18 short tons) in body mass.

== History of discovery ==
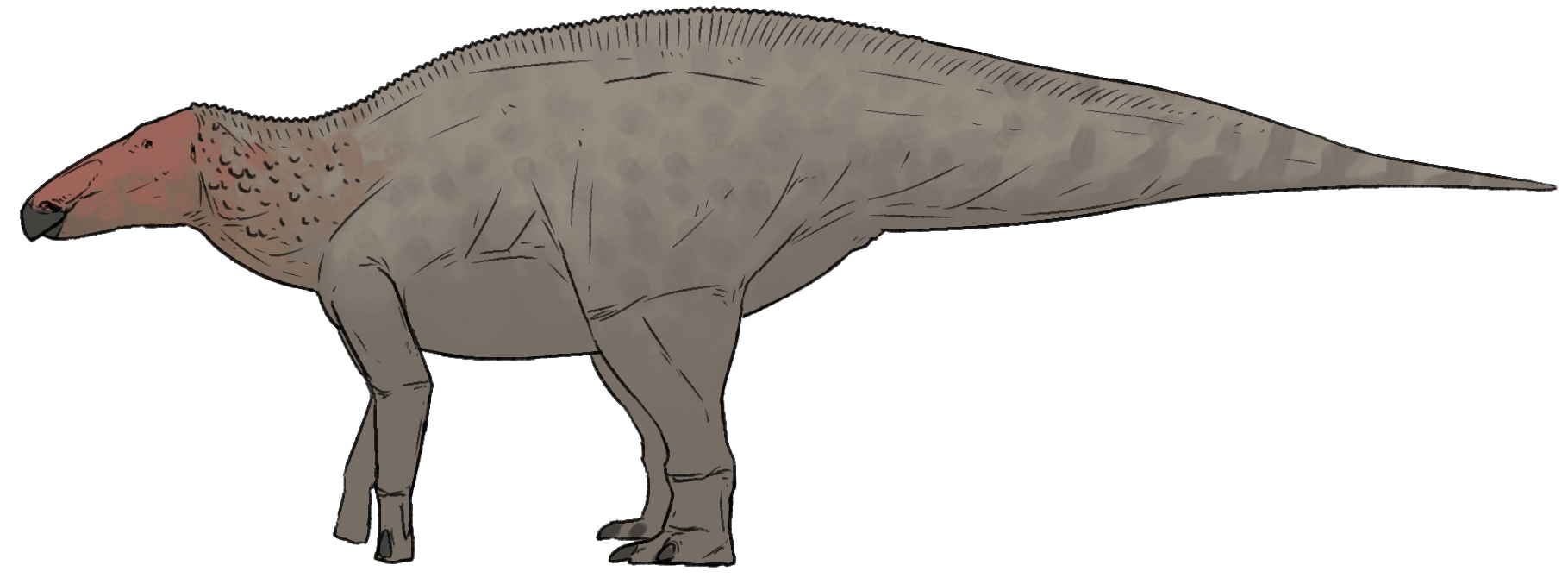
Illustration

First described in 1973, Shantungosaurus is known from over five incomplete skeletons that were unearthed from 1964 to 1968. Chinese scientist Xing Xu and his colleagues indicate that Shantungosaurus is very similar to and shares many unique characters with Edmontosaurus, forming a node of an Edmontosaurus–Shantungosaurus clade between North America and Asia, based on the new materials recovered in Shandong. Remains of several individuals, including skull bones, limb bones, and vertebrae, were found in Shandong, China. These specimens were classified in the new genus and species Zhuchengosaurus maximus in 2007. However, further study showed that the supposedly distinct features of Zhuchengosaurus were simply a result of different growth stages.

== Description ==
Size comparison of several large ornithopods, Shantungosaurus in red

Shantungosaurus giganteus is one of the largest known ornithischians. The type skull is 1.63 metres (5.3 ft) long, and the composite skeleton mounted at the Chinese Academy of Geological Sciences in Beijing measures 14.7 metres (48 ft) in length. Another mounted skeleton, originally referred to as Zhuchengosaurus maximus, measures 16.6 metres (54 ft) in length. The largest individuals may have weighed as much as 16 tonnes (18 short tons). In 2012, Butler and Barrett estimated its maximum length up to 17 metres (56 ft). In 2016, Gregory S. Paul suggested that previous studies have overestimated the size of this dinosaur, moderating it at 15 metres (49 ft) in length and 13 metric tons (14 short tons) in body mass, which still makes this dinosaur the largest hadrosaur. Like all hadrosaurs its beak was toothless, but its jaws were packed with around 1,500 tiny chewing teeth. A large hole near its nostrils may have been covered by a loose flap of skin, which could be inflated to make sounds.

== Classification ==
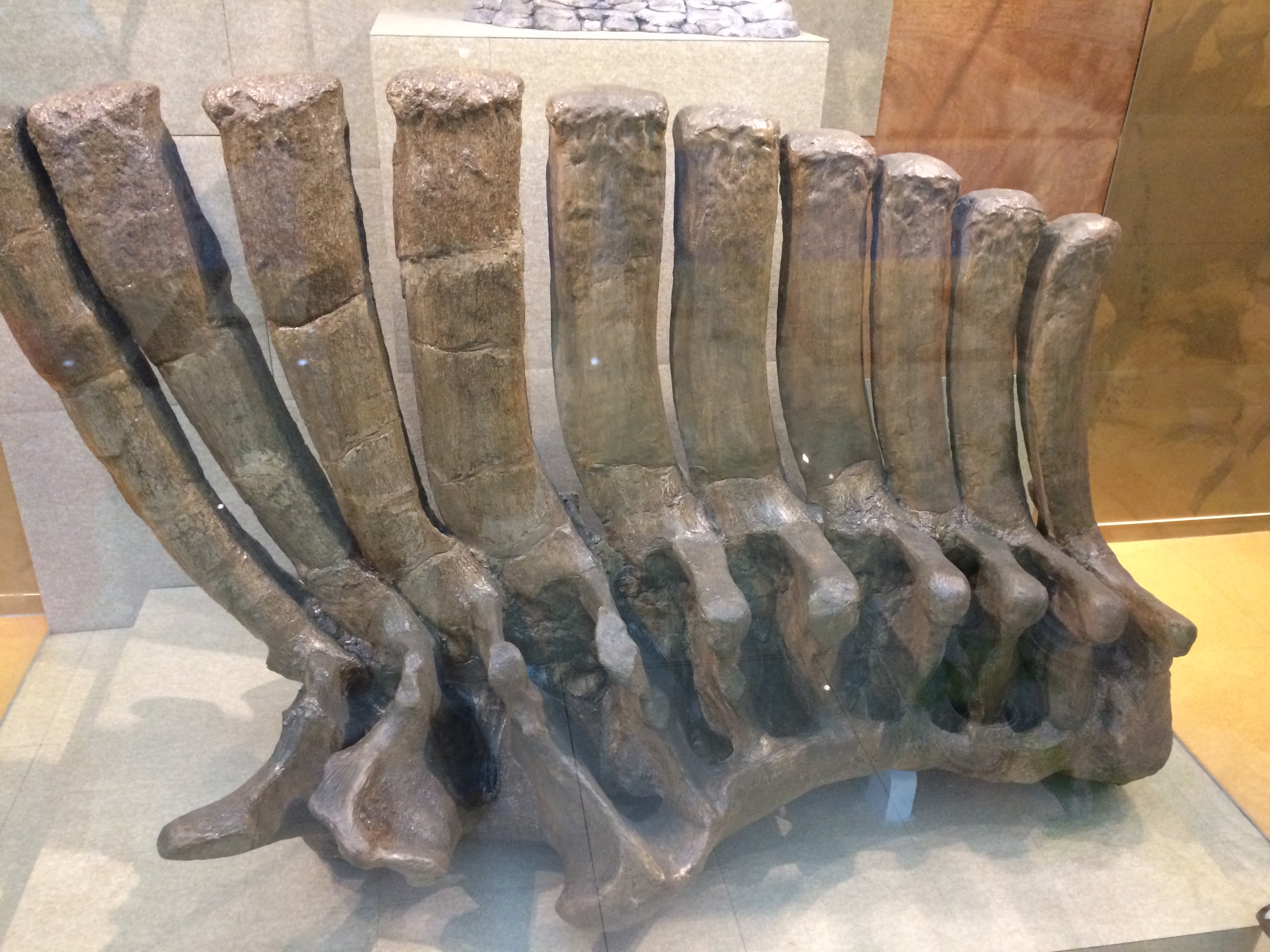
Sacrum once classified as Huaxiaosaurus

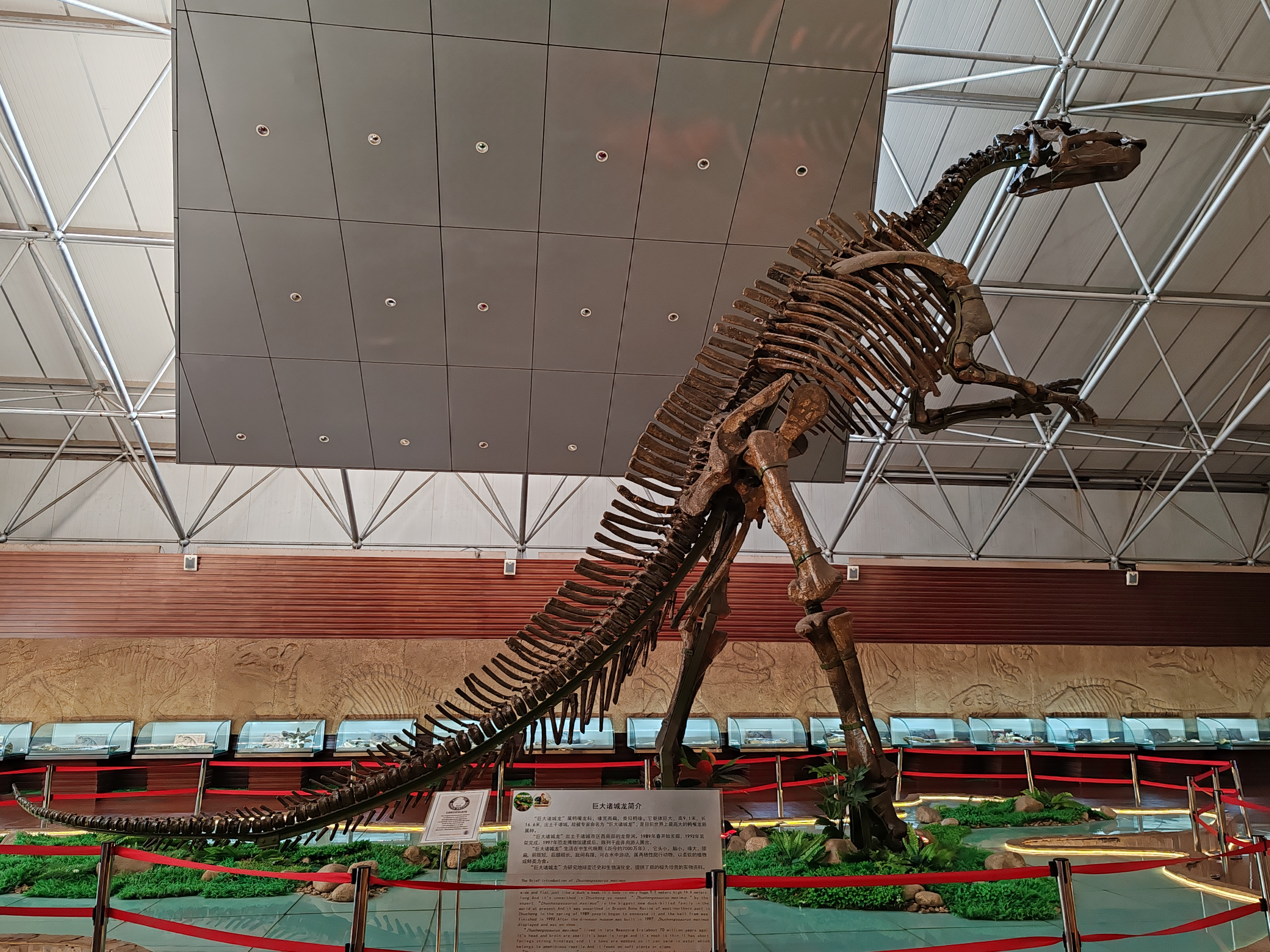
Restored skeleton in bipedal stance

Recent maximum parsimony-based phylogenetic analyses of Hadrosauroidea from Xing and colleagues recovered a stable sister group relationship between Edmontosaurus and Shantungosaurus. Shantungosaurus is the single hadrosaurid from the Zhucheng area that is considered valid. Zhuchengosaurus and Huaxiaosaurus, both of which are known from the same region, have been interpreted by the analyses as junior synonyms of Shantungosaurus. All unequivocal morphological discrepancies among these three taxa could be attributed to intraspecific variation (ontogenetic and polymorphic variation) and post-depositional distortion.

The following cladogram is the result of Prieto-Márquez et al. in 2016. It shows the position of Shantungosaurus as sister group of Edmontosaurus in the Edmontosaurini clade:

- - Telmatosaurus
  - - - Jintasaurus
      - Lophorhothon
    - - Claosaurus
      - - Tethyshadros
        - Hadrosauridae
          - Hadrosaurus
          - - Eotrachodon
            - Saurolophidae
              - Lambeosaurinae
              - Saurolophinae
                - - Acristavus
                  - Maiasaura
                  - Brachylophosaurus
                - - - Naashoibitosaurus
                    - - Kritosaurus
                      - - Gryposaurus
                        - - Aquilarhinus
                          - - Willinakaqe
                            - Secernosaurus
                  - - "Sabinosaur" PASAC-1
                    - - - Prosaurolophus
                        - - Augustynolophus
                          - Saurolophus
                      - - Kerberosaurus
                        - - Kundurosaurus
                          - - Shantungosaurus
                            - Edmontosaurus

== See also ==
- Timeline of hadrosaur research

== Sources ==
- Dong Zhiming (1992). Dinosaurian Faunas of China. Beijing: China Ocean Press. ISBN 3-540-52084-8.
- Mallam, John (2003). Encyclopedia of Dinosaurs. UK: Parragon Publishing. p. 157.
