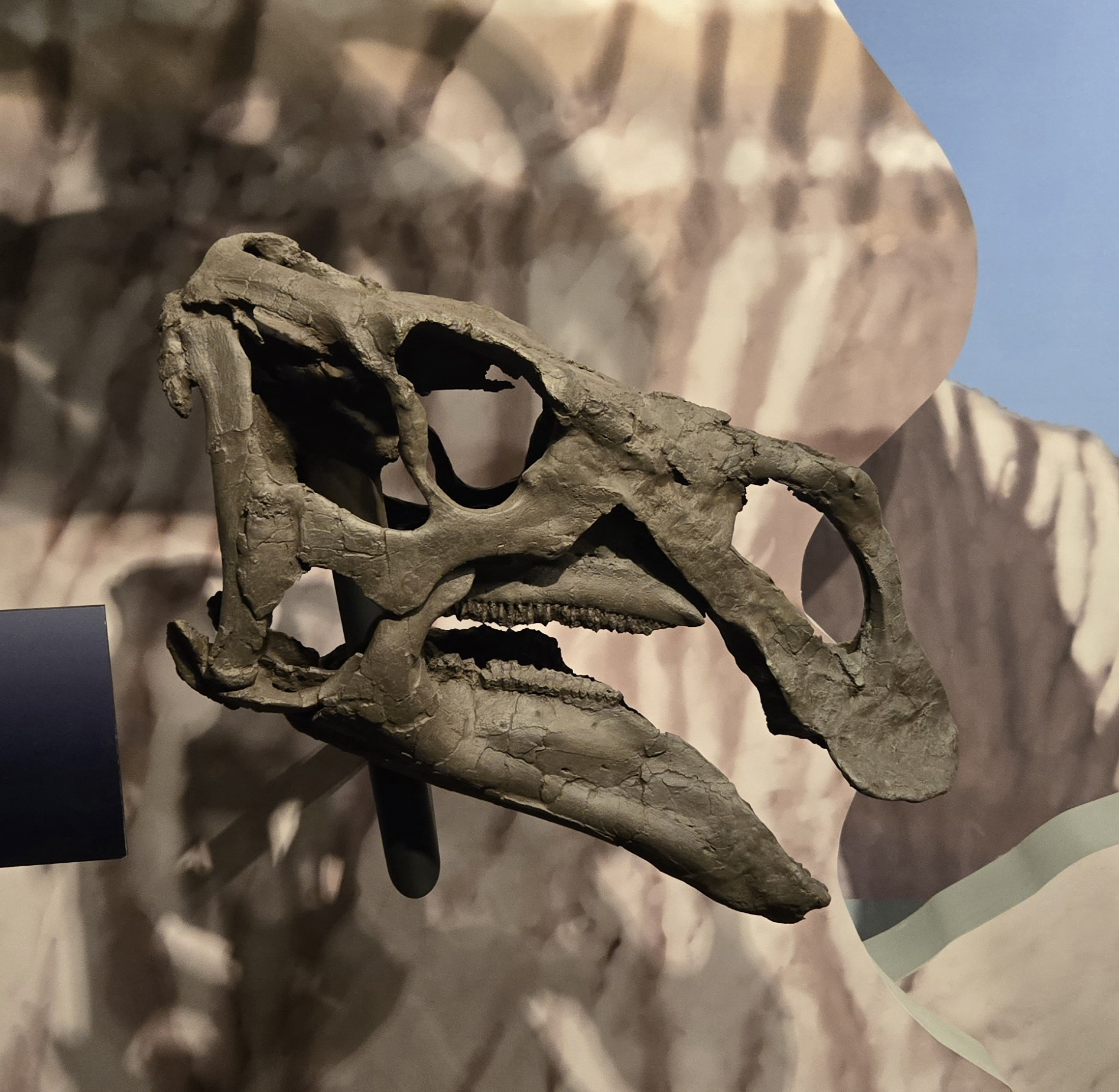
- Skull cast

Scientific classification
- Kingdom: Animalia
- Phylum: Chordata
- Class: Reptilia
- Clade: Dinosauria
- Clade: †Ornithischia
- Clade: †Ornithopoda
- Family: †Hadrosauridae
- Subfamily: †Saurolophinae
- Tribe: †Brachylophosaurini
- Genus: †Acristavus; Gates et al., 2011
- Species: †A. gagslarsoni

Binomial name
- †Acristavus gagslarsoni Gates et al., 2011

= Acristavus =

Acristavus Temporal range: Late Cretaceous, 79 Ma

Extinct genus of dinosaurs

Acristavus (meaning "non-crested grandfather") is a genus of saurolophine dinosaur. Fossils have been found from the Campanian Two Medicine Formation in Montana and Wahweap Formation in Utah, United States. The type species A. gagslarsoni was named in 2011. Unlike nearly all hadrosaurids, Acristavus lacked ornamentation on its skull. The discovery of Acristavus is paleontologically significant because it supports the position that the ancestor of all hadrosaurids did not possess cranial ornamentation, and that ornamentation was an adaptation that later arose interdependently in the subfamilies Saurolophinae and Lambeosaurinae. It is closely related to Brachylophosaurus and Maiasaura, and was assigned to a new clade called Brachylophosaurini.

== Discovery and occurrence ==
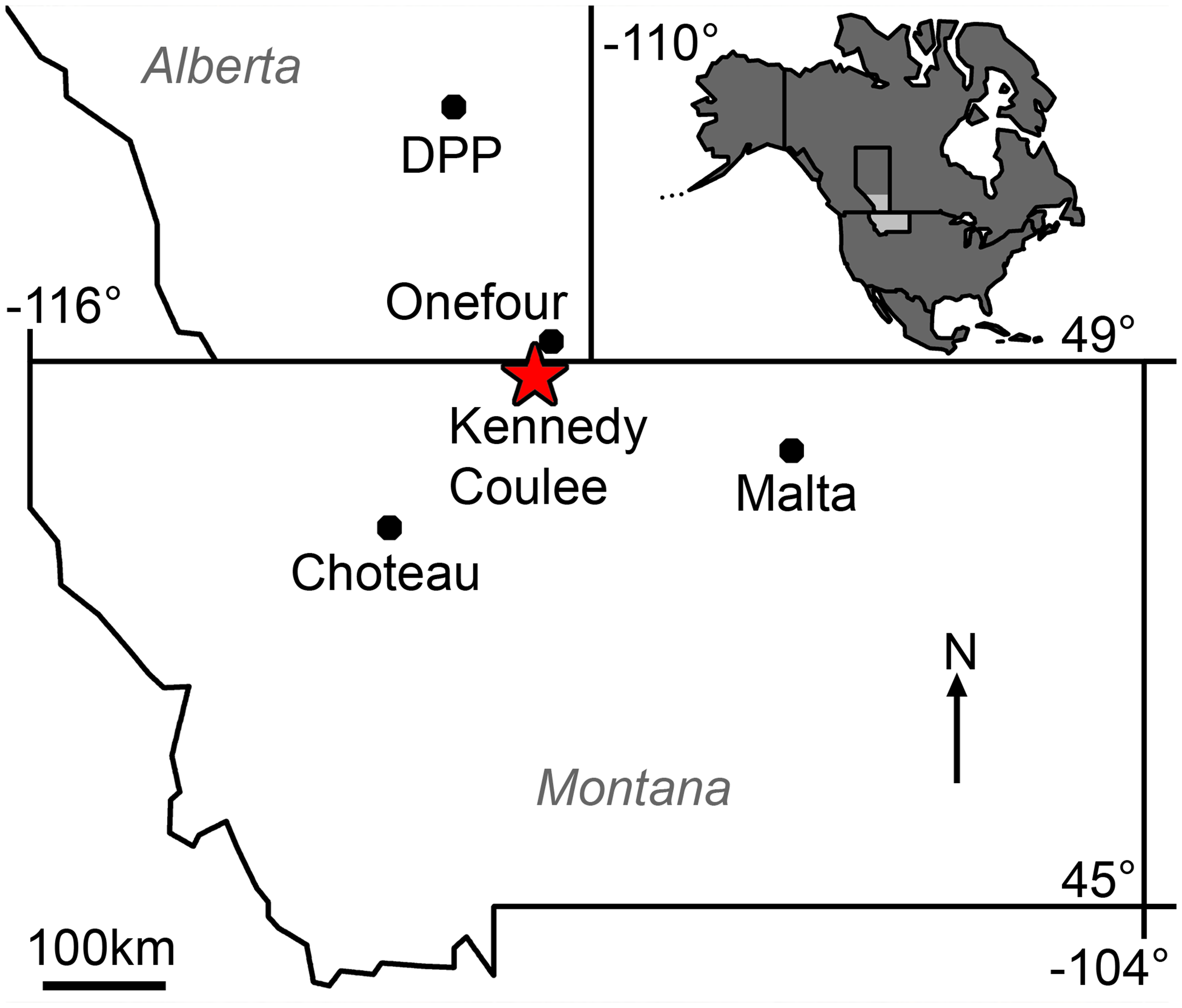
Map of Brachylophosaurini (Saurolophinae) specimen discoveries in Alberta and Montana. The first remains of Acristavus have been found in Teton County (not far from Choteau, visible on the map).

The holotype specimen of Acristavus, MOR 1155, was recovered at the Two Medicine Formation, in Teton County, Montana. The specimen was collected in 1999 by C. Riley Nelson in well-indurated tan colored calcareous sandstone that was deposited during the Campanian stage of the Cretaceous period, approximately 79 million years ago. MOR 1155 consists of an almost complete skull with associated postcrania including eleven cervical vertebrae, three incomplete dorsal vertebrae, a proximal caudal vertebra, several dorsal ribs, the left humerus, the left ulna, the right sternal, the left pubis, the left femur, the left tibia, two left metatarsals, five left pedal phalanges and one right pedal phalanx. A second specimen UMNHVP 16607 assigned to Acristavus in 2011, was excavated from the Smokey Mountain Road locality in the Reynolds Point Member of the Wahweap Formation in Utah. It was collected by C. R. Nelson in 2000, in lithified, yellow sandstone and its age was estimated to be 80.69 Ma, with a range of uncertainty of 81.05-80.19 Ma. UMNHVP 16607 consists of a partial articulated skull, including both lacrimals, a complete braincase, and a cervical vertebra.

== Description ==
=== Distinguishing anatomical features ===
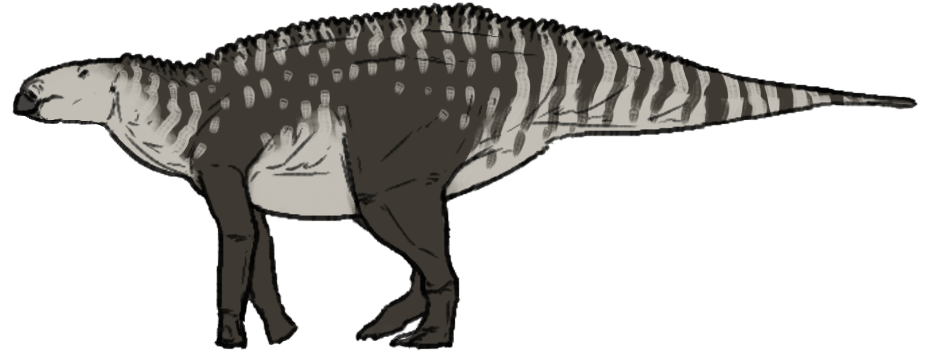
Life restoration

A diagnosis is a statement of the anatomical features of an organism (or group) that collectively distinguish it from all other organisms. Some, but not all, of the features in a diagnosis are also autapomorphies. An autapomorphy is a distinctive anatomical feature that is unique to a given organism.

According to Gates (2011), Acristavus can be distinguished based on the following characteristics:

- an enlarged caudodorsal brow of the postorbital and the basioccipital, which extends caudally well beyond the dorsal border of the foremen magnum to a greater extent than in other hadrosaurine species
- a deep laterally squared frontonasal suture
- swelling of the interdigitate suture between the prefrontal and frontal
- a deep depression is present on the lateral surface of the postorbital jugal process

== Classification ==
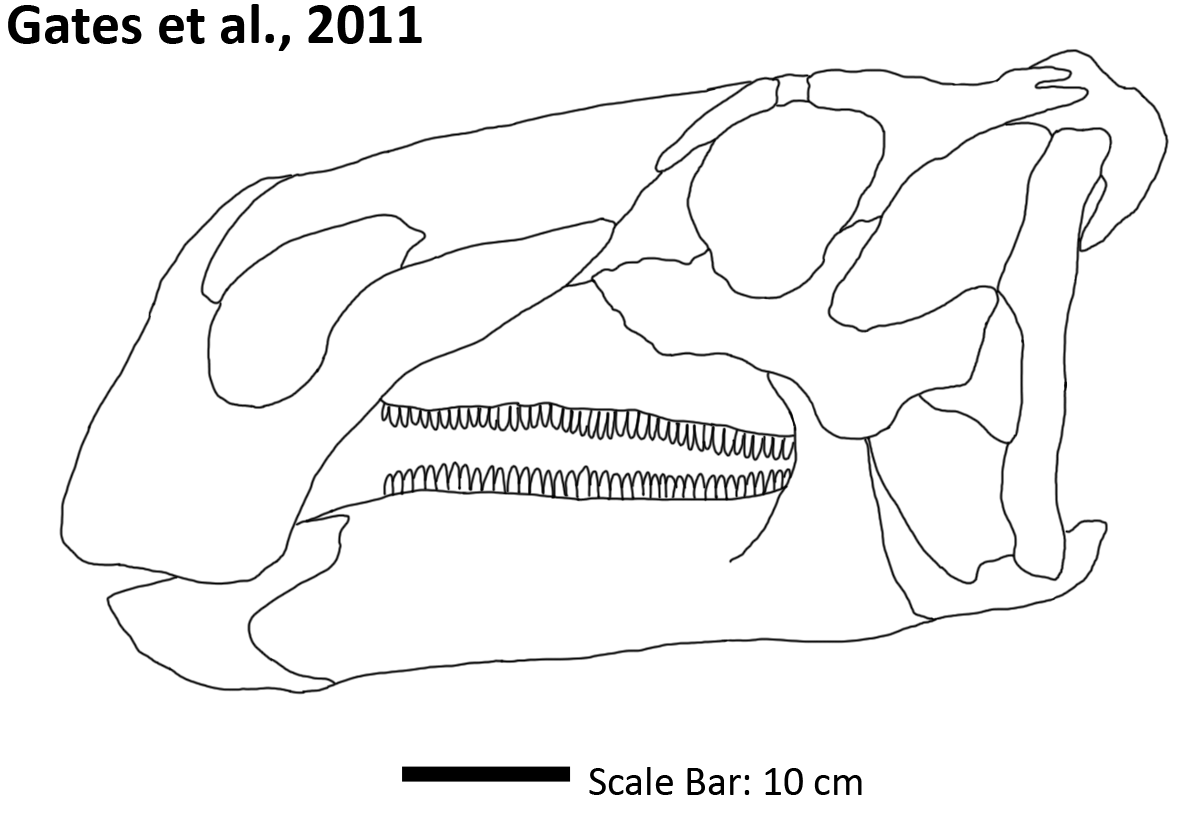
Skull diagram

Acristavus was first assigned to the Brachylophosaurini, in a basal position, by Gates et al. (2011). All subsequent phylogenetic analyses have confirmed this assignment. Brachylophosaurines are derived members of the group Saurolophinae. Other brachylophosaurins include Maiasaura, Brachylophosaurus, and potentially Wulagasaurus. Gates concluded that Acristavus and Maiasaura shared a sister-taxon relationship but more recent analysis by Prieto-Márquez (2013) shows that Maiasaura is more closely related to the more derived Brachylophosaurus.

The following cladogram is based on the 2013 phylogenetic analysis by Prieto-Márquez (the relationships within Lambeosaurinae and between basal hadrosauroids are not shown):

- - Telmatosaurus
  - - Lophorhothon
    - Hadrosauridae
      - Hadrosaurus
      - Saurolophidae
        - Lambeosaurinae
        - Saurolophinae
          - Brachylophosaurini
            - Acristavus
            - - Maiasaura
              - Brachylophosaurus
          - - Kerberosaurus
            - - Wulagasaurus
              - - Edmontosaurini
                  - Shantungosaurus
                  - - Edmontosaurus annectens
                    - Edmontosaurus regalis
                - - PASAC-1 (Unnamed Sabinas species)
                  - - Saurolophini
                      - Prosaurolophus
                      - - Saurolophus morrisi
                        - - Saurolophus osborni
                          - Saurolophus angustirostris
                    - Kritosaurini
                      - Naashoibitosaurus
                      - - - Kritosaurus horneri
                          - Kritosaurus navajovius
                        - - - Gryposaurus latidens
                            - - Gryposaurus notabilis
                              - Gryposaurus monumentensis
                          - - UTEP 37.7 (Unnamed Big Bend species)
                            - - Secernosaurus
                              - Willinakaqe

== Paleoecology ==
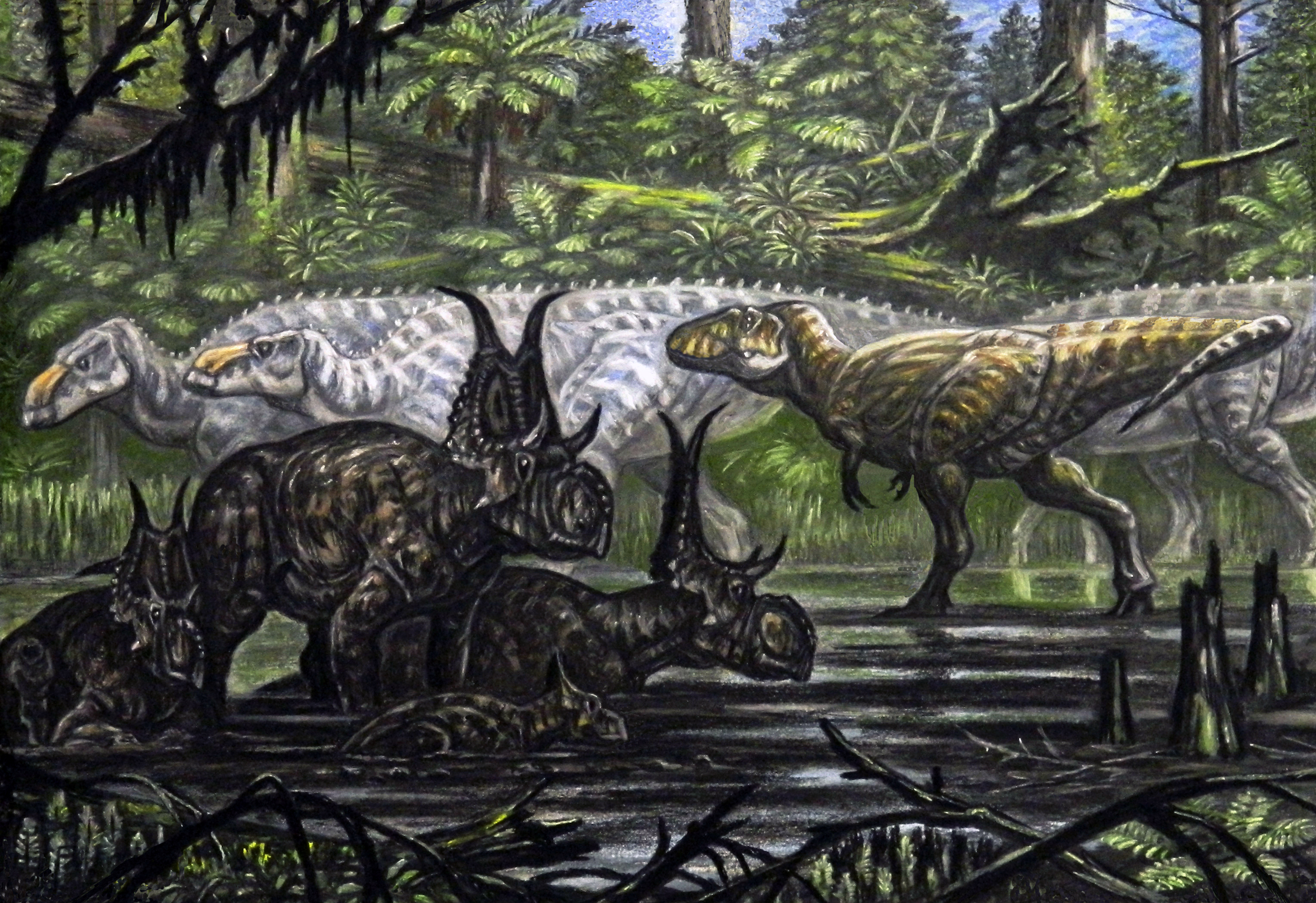
Acristavus with contemporary dinosaurs of the Wahweap Formation

=== Habitat ===
The Wahweap Formation has been radiometrically dated as being between 81 and 76 million years old. During the time that Acristavus lived, the Western Interior Seaway was at its widest extent, almost completely isolating southern Laramidia off from the rest of North America. The area where dinosaurs lived included lakes, floodplains, and east-flowing rivers. The Wahweap Formation is part of the Grand Staircase region, an immense sequence of sedimentary rock layers that stretch south from Bryce Canyon National Park through Zion National Park and into the Grand Canyon. The presence of rapid sedimentation and other evidence suggests a wet, seasonal climate.

=== Paleofauna ===
Acristavus shared its paleoenvironment with other dinosaurs, such as the lambeosaur Adelolophus hutchisoni, the ceratopsian Diabloceratops eatoni, unnamed ankylosaurs and pachycephalosaurs, and the theropod Lythronax argestes, which was likely the apex predator in its ecosystem. Vertebrates present in the Wahweap Formation at the time of Acristavus included freshwater fish, bowfins, abundant rays and sharks, turtles like Compsemys, crocodilians, and lungfish. A fair number of mammals lived in this region, which included several genera of multituberculates, cladotherians, marsupials, and placental insectivores. These mammals were more primitive than those that lived in the area that is now the Kaiparowits Formation. Trace fossils are relatively abundant in the Wahweap Formation, and suggest the presence of crocodylomorphs, as well as ornithischian and theropod dinosaurs. In 2010 a unique trace fossil was discovered that suggests a predator-prey relationship between dinosaurs and primitive mammals. The trace fossil includes at least two fossilized mammalian den complexes as well as associated digging grooves presumably caused by a maniraptoran dinosaur. The proximity indicates a case of probable active predation of the burrow inhabitants by the animals that made the claw marks. Invertebrate activity in this formation ranged from fossilized insect burrows in petrified logs to various mollusks, large crabs, and a wide diversity of gastropods and ostracods.

== See also ==
- Timeline of hadrosaur research
