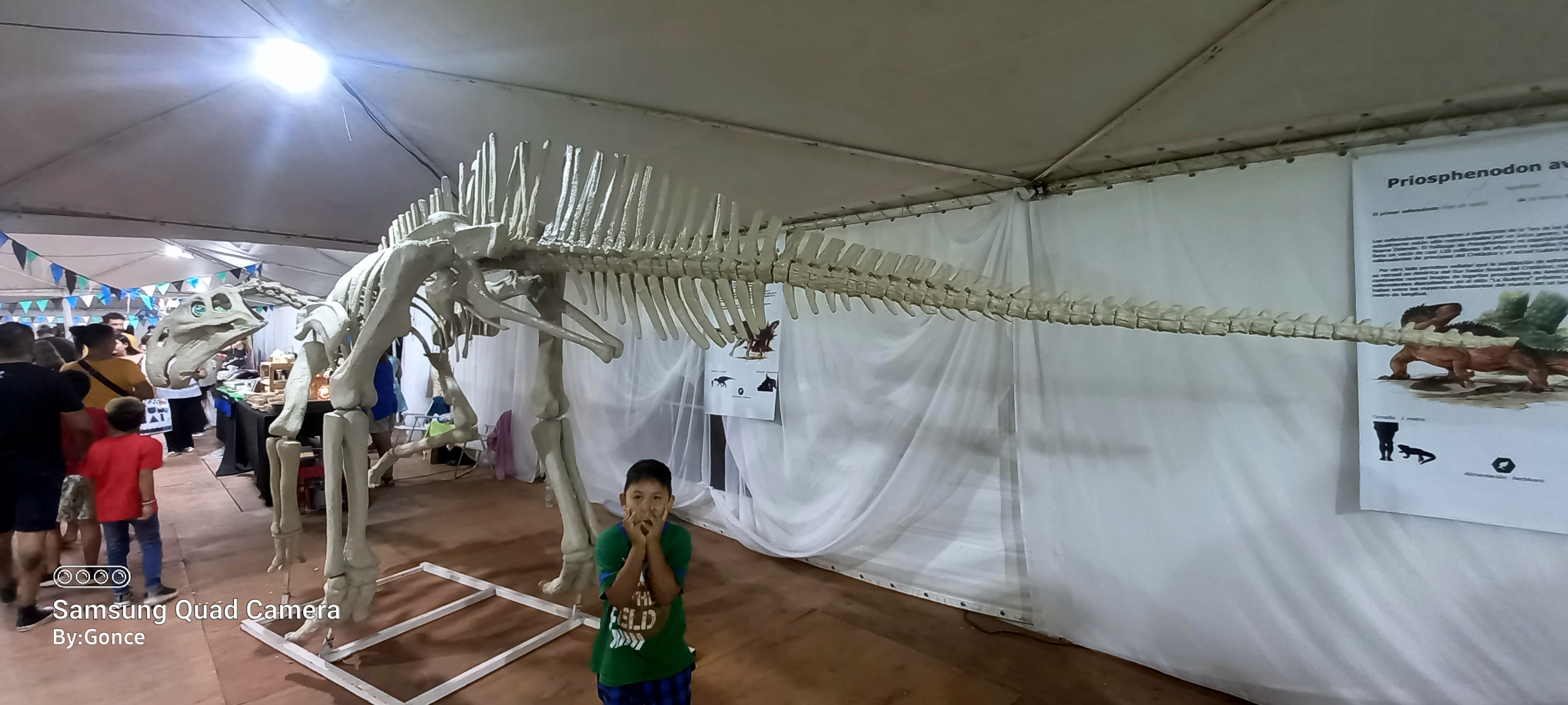
- Restored skeleton

Scientific classification
- Domain: Eukaryota
- Kingdom: Animalia
- Phylum: Chordata
- Clade: Dinosauria
- Clade: †Ornithischia
- Clade: †Ornithopoda
- Family: †Hadrosauridae
- Subfamily: †Saurolophinae
- Genus: †Willinakaqe; Juárez Valieri et al., 2010
- Species: †W. salitralensis

Binomial name
- †Willinakaqe salitralensis Juárez Valieri et al., 2010

= Willinakaqe =

Willinakaqe Temporal range: Upper Cretaceous, Campanian–Maastrichtian

Extinct genus of dinosaurs

Willinakaqe is a dubious genus of saurolophine hadrosaurid dinosaur described based on fossils from the late Cretaceous (late Campanian-early Maastrichtian stage) of the Río Negro Province of southern Argentina.

== Discovery and naming ==
Willinakaqe was first named by Rubén D. Juárez Valieri, José A. Haro, Lucas E. Fiorelli and Jorge O. Calvo in 2010 and the type species is Willinakaqe salitralensis. The generic name means "Southern duck-mimic", in the Mapuche language (willi, "south", iná, "mimic" and kaqe, "duck"). The specific name refers to the Salitral.

Willinakaqe is known from several disarticulated specimens, among them juvenile and adult individuals found at the Salitral Moreno site of the Lower Member of the Allen Formation. The holotype is MPCA-Pv SM 8, a right premaxilla. A second site in the Malvinas Argentinas Partido has rendered additional specimens. Together the material represents the majority of the skeleton. Some of the fossils were previously discussed in the literature as potentially representing a Patagonian lambeosaurine.

A revision of the original diagnosis of Willinakaqe salitralensis and of fossil material attributed to this species was published by Cruzado Caballero and Coria in 2016, who argue that the fossils attributed to Willinakaqe salitralensis might represent more than a single taxon of hadrosaurid and that all characters of the original diagnosis are invalid, meanwhile the holotype itself is too weathered and incomplete to support a diagnosis; thus, the taxon Willinakaqe salitrensis must be considered a nomen vanum.

== Phylogeny ==
The describers assigned Willinakaqe to the Saurolophidae within the Hadrosauroidea.

In 2010 cladistic analyses by Prieto-Márquez confirmed that the only two hadrosaurid taxa known from South America, Willinakaqe and Secernosaurus, form a clade within the Saurolophinae. Prieto-Márquez & Salinas 2010, Prieto-Márquez, 2010 and Juárez Valieri e.a. considered "Kritosaurus" australis to be identical to Secernosaurus.

Cladogram after Prieto-Márquez, 2010:

- Saurolophinae
  - - Acristavus
    - - Maiasaura
      - Brachylophosaurus
  - - Shantungosaurus
    - - - Edmontosaurus annectens
        - Edmontosaurus regalis
      - - - Unnamed Sabinas species (PASAC-1)
          - Kerberosaurus
          - - Prosaurolophus
            - - Saurolophus osborni
              - Saurolophus angustirostris
        - - Wulagasaurus
          - - Kritosaurus
            - - - Gryposaurus latidens
                - - Gryposaurus notabilis
                  - Gryposaurus monumentensis
              - - Aquilarhinus
                - - Secernosaurus
                  - Willinakaqe

== See also ==
- Timeline of hadrosaur research
