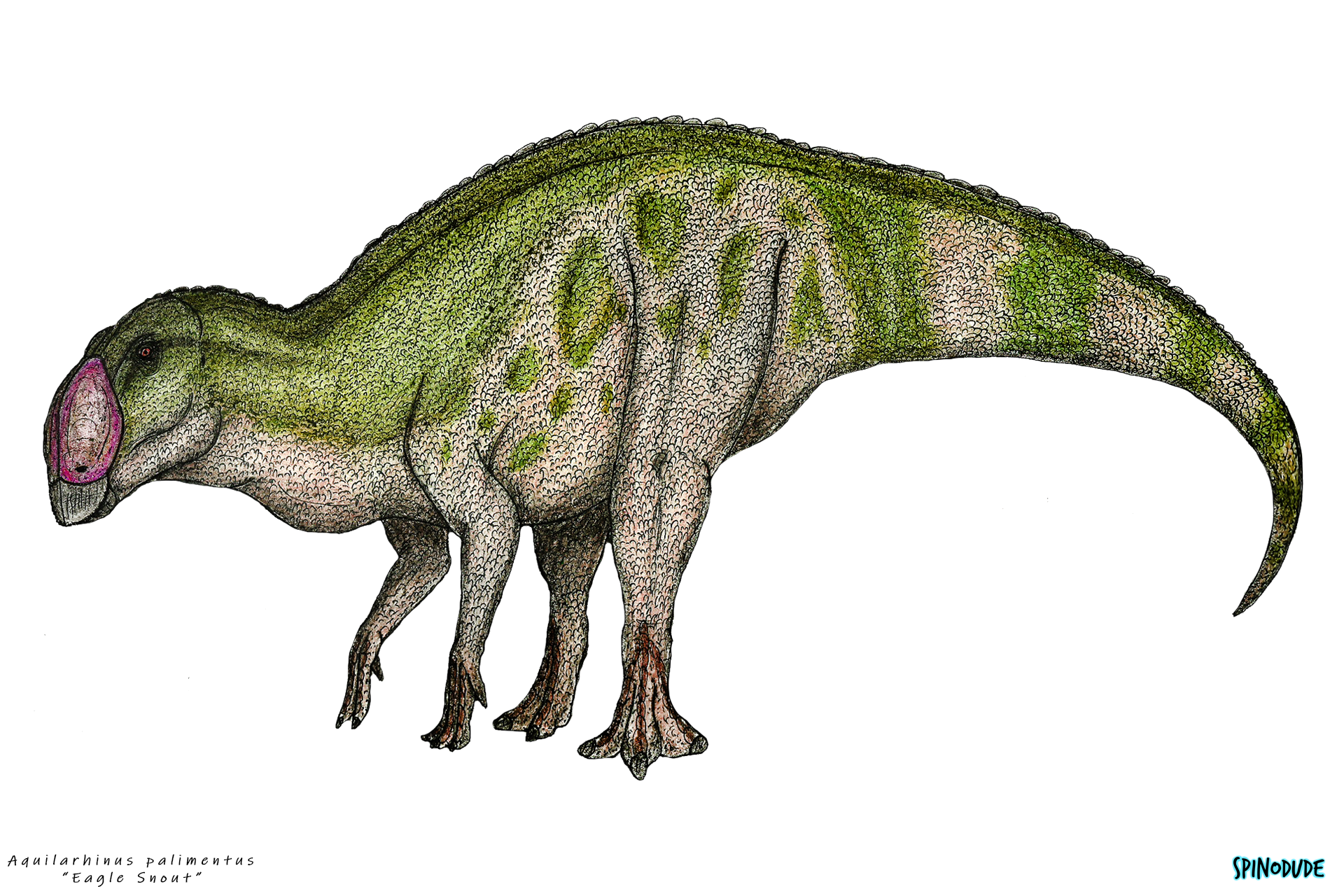
- Restoration

Scientific classification
- Kingdom: Animalia
- Phylum: Chordata
- Class: Reptilia
- Clade: Dinosauria
- Clade: †Ornithischia
- Clade: †Ornithopoda
- Family: †Hadrosauridae
- Genus: †Aquilarhinus; Prieto-Márquez, Wagner and Lehman, 2019
- Species: †A. palimentus

Binomial name
- †Aquilarhinus palimentus Prieto-Márquez, Wagner and Lehman, 2019

= Aquilarhinus =

Aquilarhinus Temporal range: Late Cretaceous, Campanian

Extinct genus of dinosaurs

Aquilarhinus (meaning "eagle snout" after the unusual beak morphology) is a genus of hadrosaurid ornithopod dinosaur from the Aguja Formation from Texas in the United States. The type and only species is Aquilarhinus palimentus. Due to its unusual dentary, it has been inferred to have had shovel-like beak morphology, different from the beaks of other hadrosaurs. It was originally classified as a Kritosaurus sp. before being reclassified as a new genus in 2019.

== Discovery ==
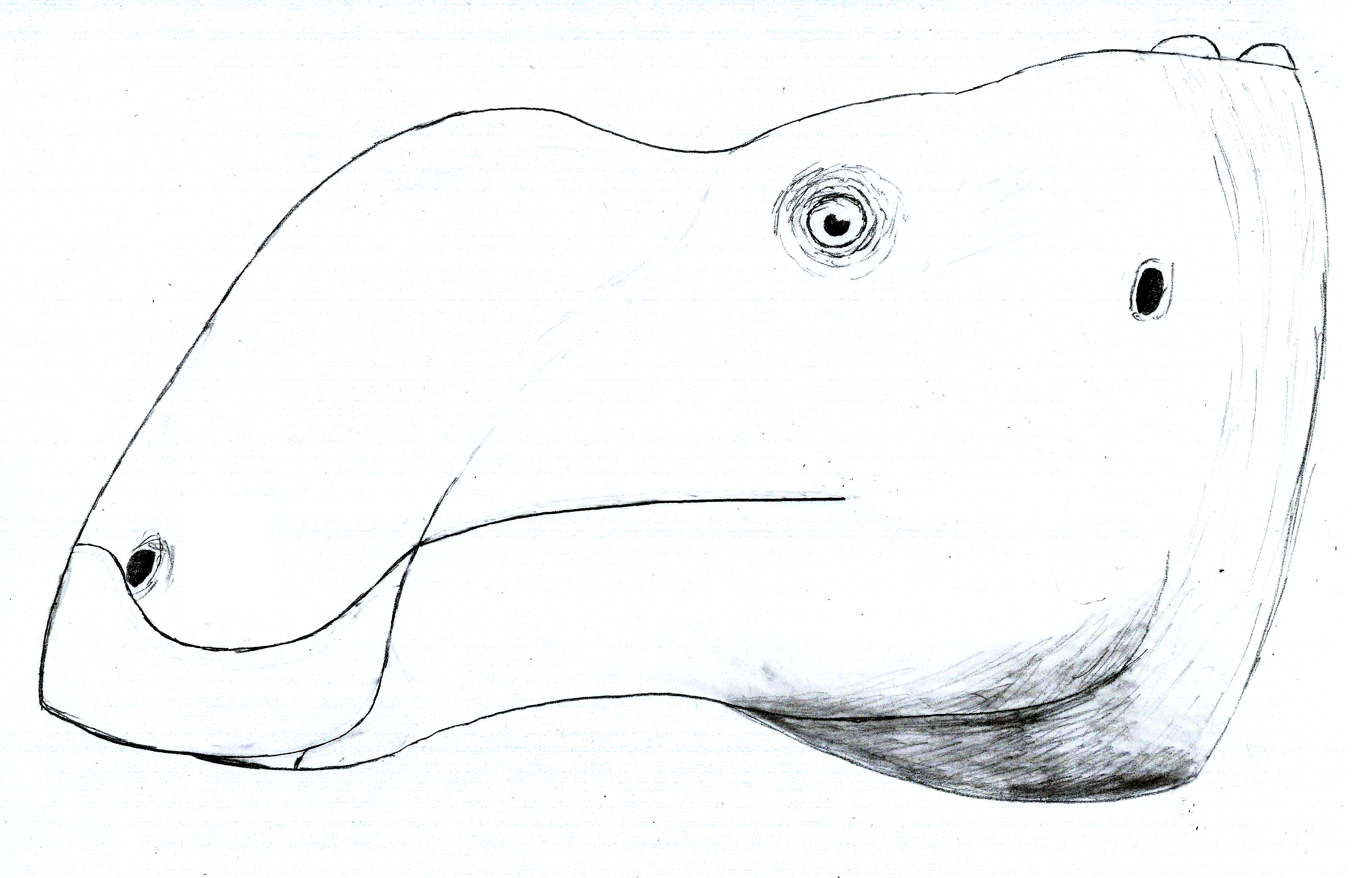
Head restoration

The holotype fossil (TMM 42452-1) of Aquilarhinus was discovered in the Lower Shale of the Aguja Formation in Big Bend National Park, Texas. Most parts of the specimen were collected in 1983, but additional elements were collected during continued excavations in 1999. The specimen was first described in 2001 as a new species of Kritosaurus, because aside from its rostrum it was morphologically very similar to Kritosaurus notabilis. The differences in the rostrum were interpreted as being a functional adaptation for "shoveling out and scooping up vegetation." Despite the fossil's identification within the genus Kritosaurus, its phylogenetic position remained unclear.

In 2019, the species was reclassified into a new genus and given its binomial name Aquilarhinus palimentus. According to Prieto-Márquez, Wagner and Lehman Aquilarhinus comes from the Latin word 'aquila' meaning 'eagle' and the Greek word 'rhinos' meaning 'nose', referring to the unique shape of the rostrum. The specific epithet palimentus would derive from the Latin words 'pala', meaning shovel, and 'mentus', meaning chin, referring the shape of the predentary and its resemblance to a spade or shovel.

== See also ==
- Timeline of hadrosaur research
