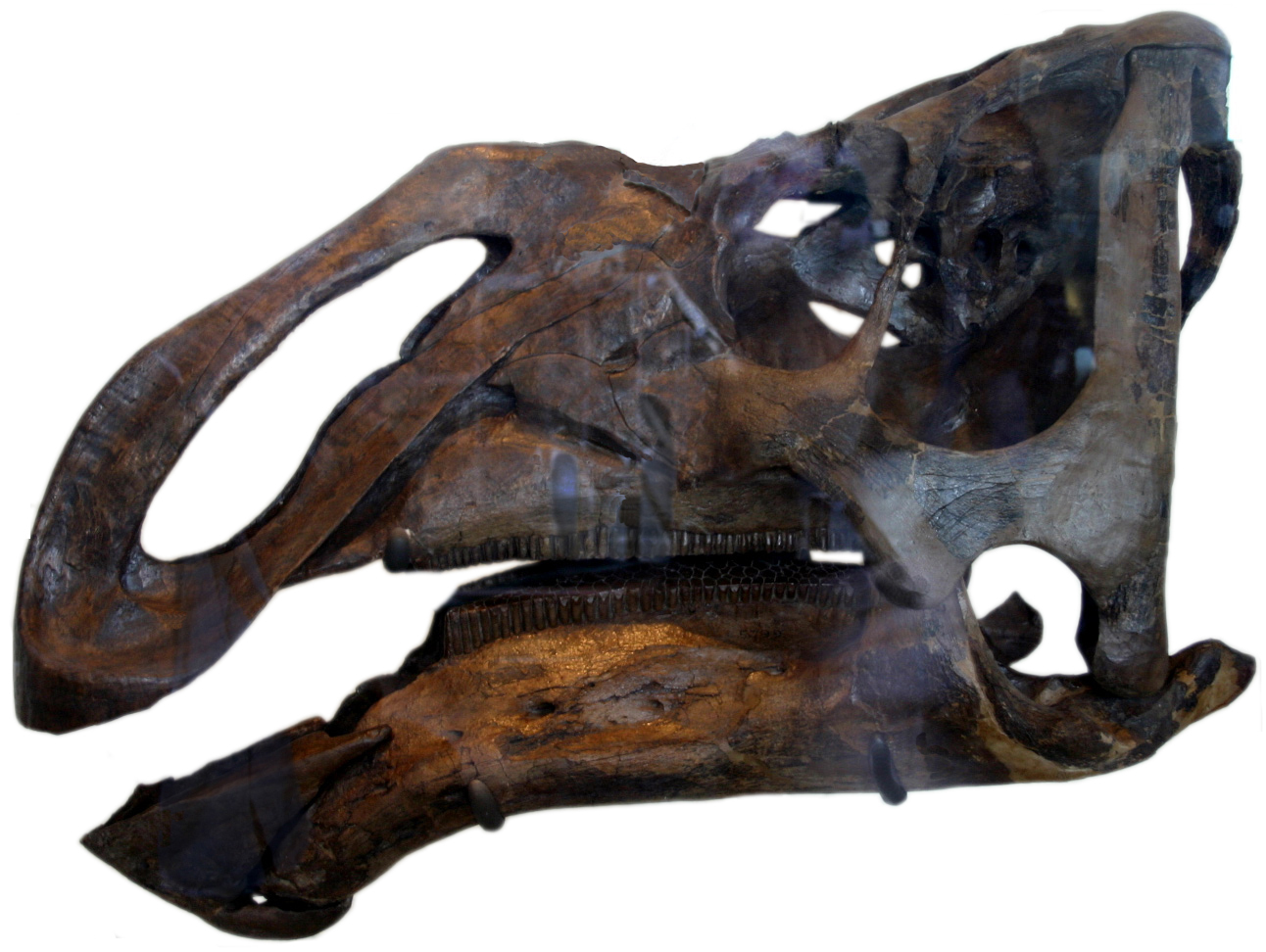
- K. navajovius holotype skull, AMNH

Scientific classification
- Kingdom: Animalia
- Phylum: Chordata
- Class: Reptilia
- Clade: Dinosauria
- Clade: †Ornithischia
- Clade: †Ornithopoda
- Family: †Hadrosauridae
- Subfamily: †Saurolophinae
- Tribe: †Kritosaurini
- Genus: †Kritosaurus; Brown, 1910

Type species
- †Kritosaurus navajovius Brown, 1910

Species
- †K. navajovius Brown, 1910 †K. horneri? Hunt & Lucas, 1993

Synonyms
- Anasazisaurus? Hunt & Lucas, 1993

= Kritosaurus =

Kritosaurus Temporal range: Late Cretaceous, 74.5–66 Ma

Extinct genus of dinosaurs

Kritosaurus is an incompletely known genus of hadrosaurid (duck-billed) dinosaur. It lived about 74.5-66 million years ago, in the Late Cretaceous of North America. The name means "separated lizard" (referring to the arrangement of the cheek bones in an incomplete type skull), but is often mistranslated as "noble lizard" in reference to the presumed "Roman nose" (in the original specimen, the nasal region was fragmented and disarticulated, and was originally restored flat).

== History of discovery ==
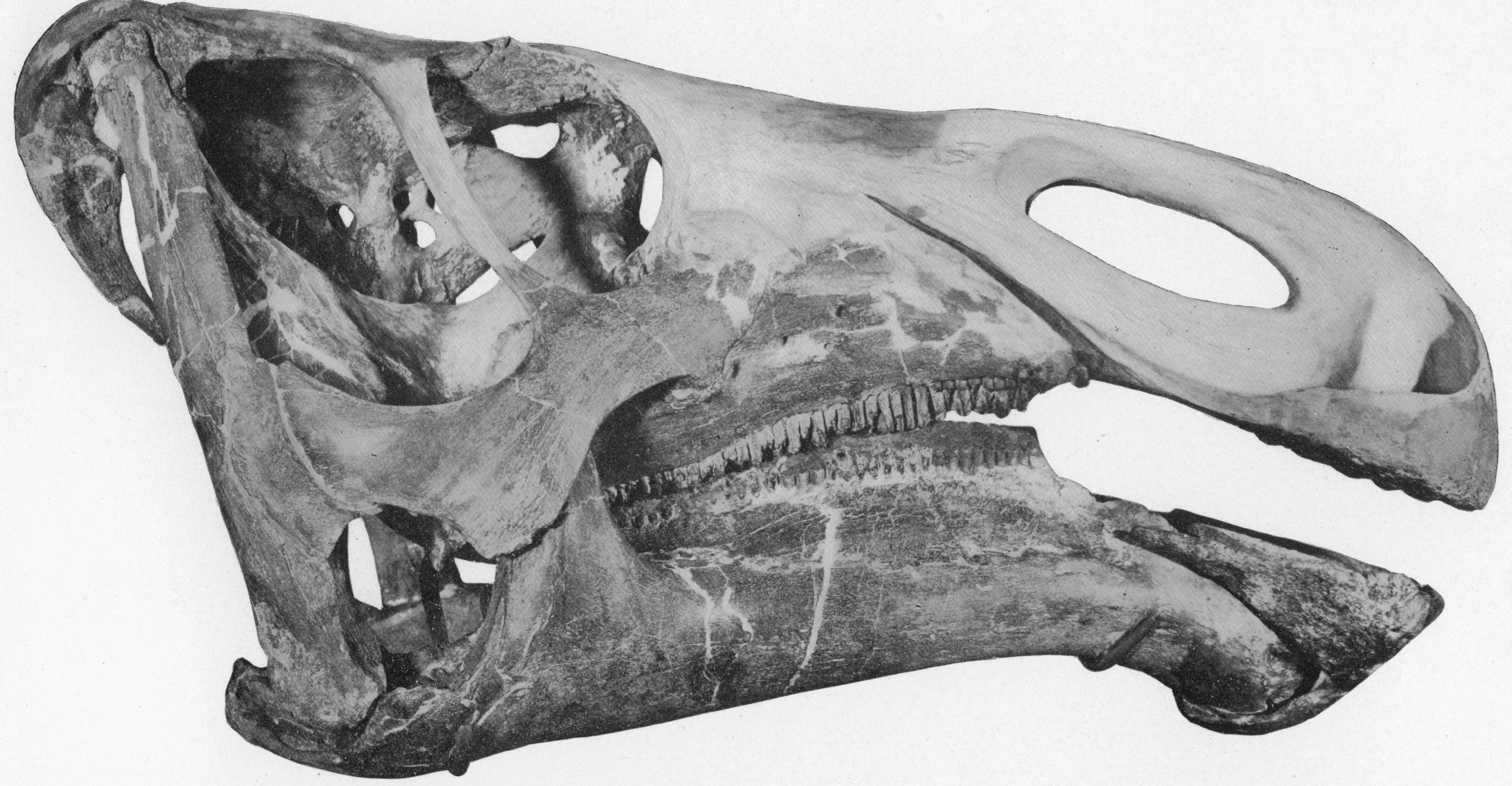
Barnum Brown's initial flatheaded reconstruction of the skull of K. navajovius, 1910

In 1904, Barnum Brown discovered the type specimen (AMNH 5799) of Kritosaurus near the Ojo Alamo Formation, San Juan County, New Mexico, United States, while following up on a previous expedition. He initially could not definitely correlate the stratigraphy, but by 1916 was able to establish it as from what is now known as the late Campanian-age De-na-zin Member of the Kirtland Formation. When discovered, much of the front of the skull had either eroded or fragmented, and Brown reconstructed this portion after what is now called Edmontosaurus, leaving out many fragments. However, he had noticed that something was different about the fragments, but ascribed the differences to crushing. He initially wanted to name it Nectosaurus, but found out that this name was already in use; Jan Versluys, who had visited Brown before the change, inadvertently leaked the previous choice. He kept the specific name, though, leading to the combination K. navajovius.

The 1914 publication of the arch-snouted Canadian genus Gryposaurus changed Brown's mind about the anatomy of his dinosaur's snout. Going back through the fragments, he revised the previous reconstruction and gave it a Gryposaurus-like arched nasal crest. He also synonymized Gryposaurus with Kritosaurus, a move supported by Charles Gilmore. This synonymy was used through the 1920s (William Parks's designation of a Canadian species as Kritosaurus incurvimanus, now considered a synonym of Gryposaurus notabilis) and became standard after the publication of Richard Swann Lull and Nelda Wright's 1942 monograph on North American hadrosaurids. From this time until 1990, Kritosaurus would be composed of at least the type species K. navajovius, K. incurvimanus, and K. notabilis, the former type species of Gryposaurus. The poorly known species Hadrosaurus breviceps (Marsh, 1889), known from a dentary from the Campanian-age Judith River Formation of Montana, was also assigned to Kritosaurus by Lull and Wright, but this is no longer accepted.

By the late 1970s and early 1980s, Hadrosaurus had entered the discussion as a possible synonym of either Kritosaurus, Gryposaurus, or both, particularly in semi-technical "dinosaur dictionaries". David B. Norman's The Illustrated Encyclopedia of Dinosaurs, uses Kritosaurus for the Canadian material (Gryposaurus), but identifies the mounted skeleton of K. incurvimanus as Hadrosaurus.

The synonymization of Kritosaurus and Gryposaurus that lasted from the 1910s to 1990 led to a distorted picture of what the original Kritosaurus material represented. Because the Canadian material was much more complete, most representations and discussions of Kritosaurus from the 1920s to 1990 are actually more applicable to Gryposaurus. This includes, for example, James Hopson's discussion of hadrosaur cranial ornamentation, and the adaptation of this for the public in The Illustrated Encyclopedia of Dinosaurs.

=== Formerly assigned species and material ===
In 1984, Argentine paleontologist José Bonaparte and colleagues named Kritosaurus australis for hadrosaur bones from the late Campanian-early Maastrichtian Los Alamitos Formation of Rio Negro, Patagonia, Argentina. In 2010, this species was thought to be a synonym of Secernosaurus koerneri. Further analysis proved the bones to belong to a new genus. Thus, Huallasaurus was named by Rozadilla et al. (2022).

In 1990, Jack Horner and David B. Weishampel once again separated Gryposaurus, citing the uncertainty associated with the latter's partial skull. Horner in 1992 described two more skulls from New Mexico that he claimed belonged to Kritosaurus and showed that it was quite different from Gryposaurus, but the following year Adrian Hunt and Spencer G. Lucas put each skull in its own genus, creating Anasazisaurus and Naashoibitosaurus.

Adrian Hunt and Spencer G. Lucas, American paleontologists, named Anasazisaurus horneri in 1993. The name was derived from the Anasazi, an ancient Native American people, and the Greek word sauros ("lizard"). The Anasazi were famous for their cliff-dwellings, such as those in Chaco Canyon, near the location of fossil Anasazisaurus remains. The term "Anasazi" itself is actually a Navajo language word, anaasází ("enemy ancestors"). The species was named in honor of Jack Horner, the American paleontologist who first described the skull in 1992. The holotype skull (and only known specimen) was collected in the late 1970s by a Brigham Young University field party working in San Juan County, and is housed at BYU as BYU 12950.

In 2002, specimen TxVP 41917–1, a partial left maxilla recovered from Bruja Canyon in Big Bend National Park, was assigned to Kritosaurus, as cf. K. navajovius. Twenty years later, it was discovered to contain a number of useful diagnostic traits that allow it to be described as a new taxon, and thus Malefica was named by Prieto-Márquez and Wagner (2023).

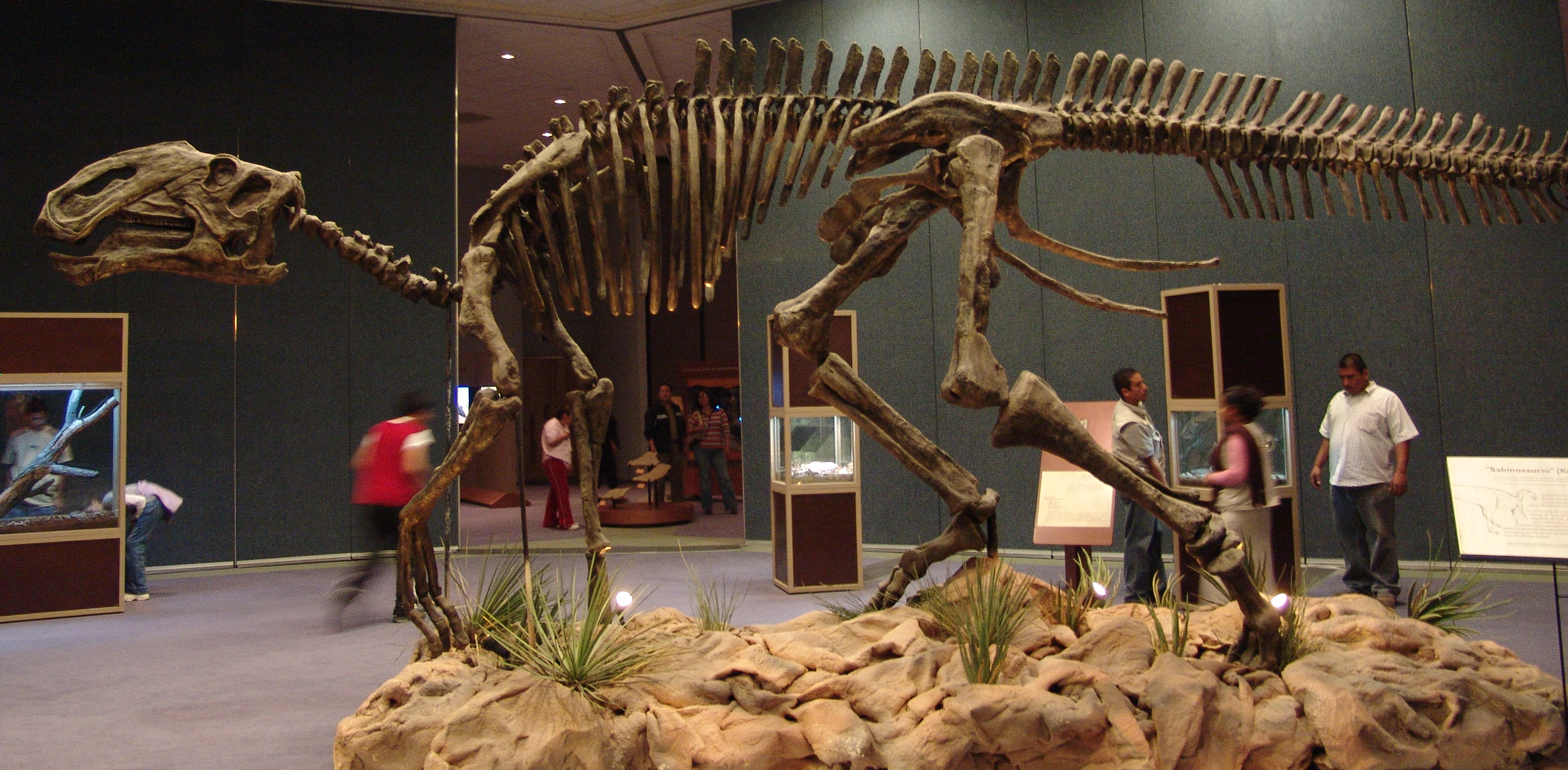
Unnamed specimen from the Sabinas Basin in Mexico, assigned to Kritosaurus sp. by Kirkland et al. (2006) but considered an indeterminate saurolophine by Prieto-Márquez (2013). The specimen is informally known as "Sabinosaurus".

Horner originally assigned the Anasazisaurus skull to Kritosaurus navajovius, but Hunt and Lucas could not find any diagnostic features in the limited material of Kritosaurus and judged the genus to be a nomen dubium. Since the Anasazisaurus skull did have diagnostic features of its own, and did not appear to them to share any unique features with Kritosaurus, it was given the new name Anasazisaurus horneri, an opinion which was supported by some later authors. Not all authors have agreed with this, Thomas E. Williamson in particular defending Horner's original interpretation, and several subsequent studies recognized both distinct genera.

A comprehensive study of known Kritosaurus material published by Albert Prieto-Márquez in 2013 upheld the status of Naashoibitosaurus as a distinct genus, but found that the type specimens of Kritosaurus and Anasazisaurus were indistinguishable when comparing overlapping elements (i.e. only those bones preserved in both specimens). Prieto-Márquez therefore regarded Anasazisaurus as a synonym of Kritosaurus, but retained it as the distinct species K. horneri.

A partial skeleton from the Sabinas Basin in Mexico was described as Kritosaurus sp. by Jim Kirkland and colleagues, but considered an indeterminate saurolophine by Prieto-Márquez (2013). This skeleton is about 20% larger than other known specimens, around 11 meters [36 ft] long, and with a distinctively curved ischium, and represents one of the largest known well-documented North American saurolophines. Unfortunately, the nasal bones are also incomplete in the skull remains from this material. The informal name "Sabinosaurus" has been given to the specimen.

A possibly second but confirmed to be valid species of Kritosaurus may have lived in the Javelina Formation alongside Kritosaurus navajovius. Kritosaurus fossils have also been unearthed in the Olmos Formation in Mexico.

== Description ==
Size comparison

The type specimen of Kritosaurus navajovius is only represented by a partial skull and lower jaws, and associated postcranial remains. The greater portion of the muzzle and upper beak are missing. However, these remains alone indicate a large body size, reaching 9 metres (30 ft) in length and 4 metric tons (4.4 short tons) in body mass.

The length of the skull is estimated at 87 cm (34 in) from the tip of the upper beak to the base of the quadrate that articulates with the lower jaw at the back of the skull. Based on the skull originally referred to Anasazisaurus, the form of the complete crest is that of a tab or flange of bone, from the nasals, that rises between and above the eyes and folds back under itself. This unique crest allows it to be distinguished from similar hadrosaurs, like Gryposaurus. The top of the crest is roughened, and the maximum preserved length of the skull could reach 90 cm (35 in). Potential diagnostic characteristics of Kritosaurus include a predentary (lower beak) without tooth-like crenulations, a sharp downward bend to the lower jaws near the beak, and a heavy, somewhat rectangular maxilla (upper tooth-bearing bone).

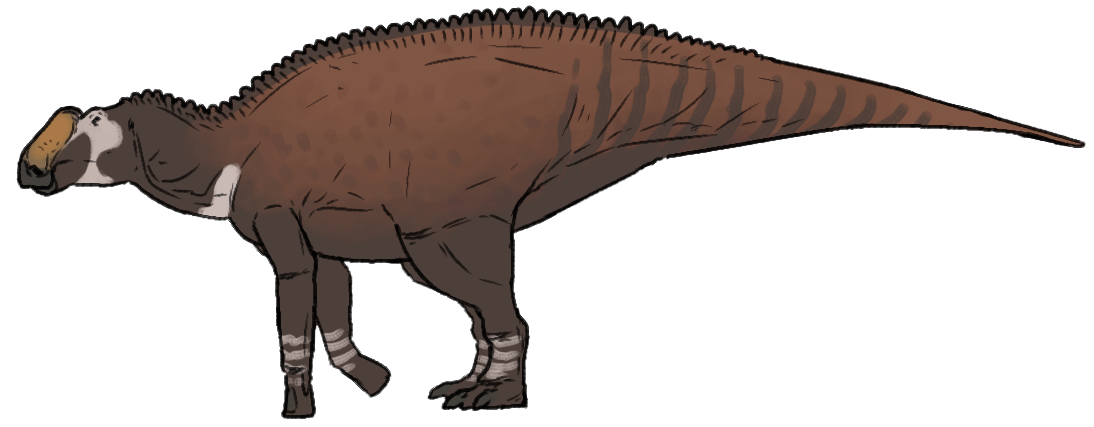
K. navajovius life restoration

According to Prieto-Márquez who re-diagnosed this genus in 2013, Kritosaurus can be distinguished based on the following characteristics: the length of the dorsolateral margin of the maxilla is extensive, the jugal features an orbital constriction that is deeper than the infratemporal one, the infratemporal fenestra is greater than the orbit and has a dorsal margin that is greatly elevated above the dorsal orbital margin in adults, the frontal bone is participating in the orbital margin, the presence of paired caudal parasagittal processes of the nasals resting over the frontal bones.

== Classification ==
Kritosaurus was a hadrosaurine hadrosaurid, a flat-headed or solid-crested duckbill. Though many species and specimens have been referred to the genus in the past, most of them do not show the shared distinguishing characteristics to allow them to be considered part of the genus, or have been synonymized with other genera of hadrosaurs. The closest relative of Kritosaurus navajovius is Anasazisaurus horneri (or Kritosaurus horneri), which, together with close relatives such as Gryposaurus and Secernosaurus, form a clade called the Kritosaurini within the larger clade Saurolophinae. Location and time separate Kritosaurus and the slightly older, primarily Canadian Gryposaurus, along with some cranial details.

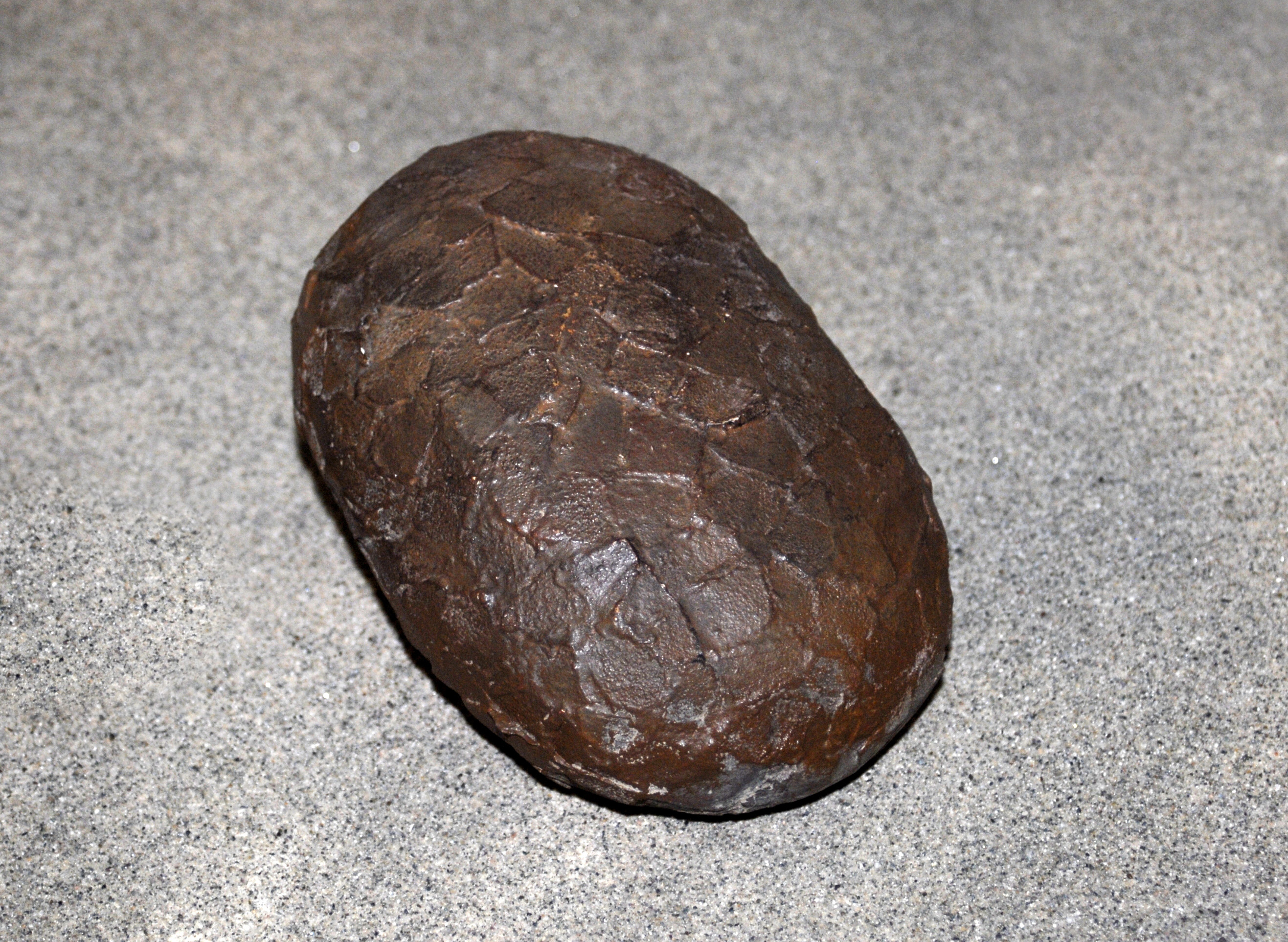
Cast of an assigned egg

The following is a cladogram based on the phylogenetic analysis conducted by Prieto-Márquez and Wagner in 2012, showing the relationships of Kritosaurus among the other Kritosaurini:

- Kritosaurini
  - Wulagasaurus
  - - Kritosaurus
    - - - Gryposaurus latidens
        - - Gryposaurus notabilis
          - Gryposaurus monumentensis
      - - Aquilarhinus palimentus
        - - Secernosaurus
          - Willinakaqe

== Paleobiology ==
The nasal crest of Kritosaurus, whatever its true form, may have been used for a variety of social functions, such as identification of sexes or species and social ranking. There may have been inflatable air sacs flanking it for both visual and auditory signaling.

=== Diet and feeding ===
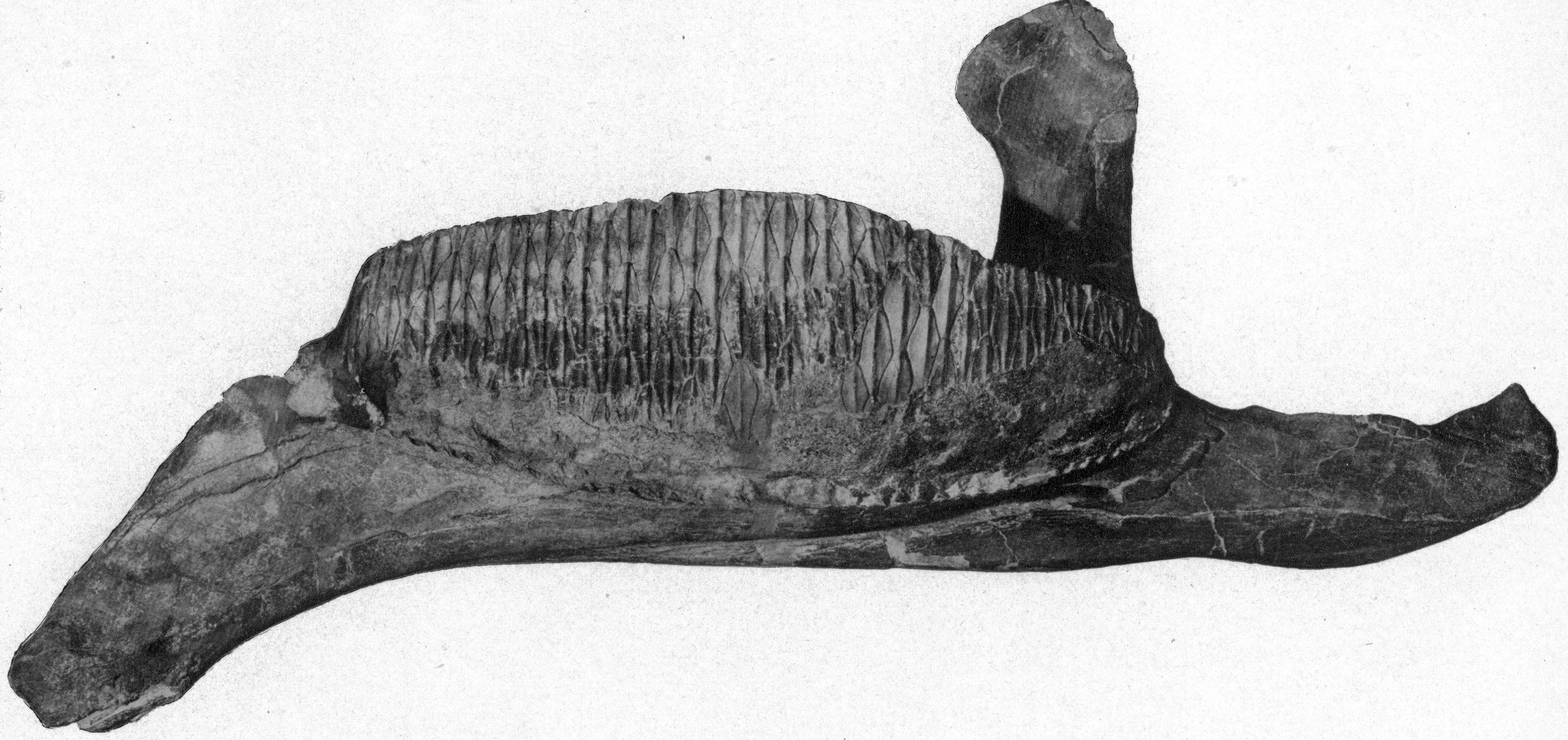
Lower jaw in inner view

As a hadrosaurid, Kritosaurus would have been a large bipedal/quadrupedal herbivore, eating plants with a sophisticated skull that permitted a grinding motion analogous to chewing. Its teeth were continually replacing and packed into dental batteries that contained hundreds of teeth, only a relative handful of which were in use at any time. Plant material would have been cropped by its broad beak, and held in the jaws by a cheek-like organ. Feeding would have been from the ground up to ~4 meters (13 ft) above. If it was a separate genus, how it would have partitioned resources with the similar and contemporaneous Naashoibitosaurus is unknown.

== Paleoecology ==
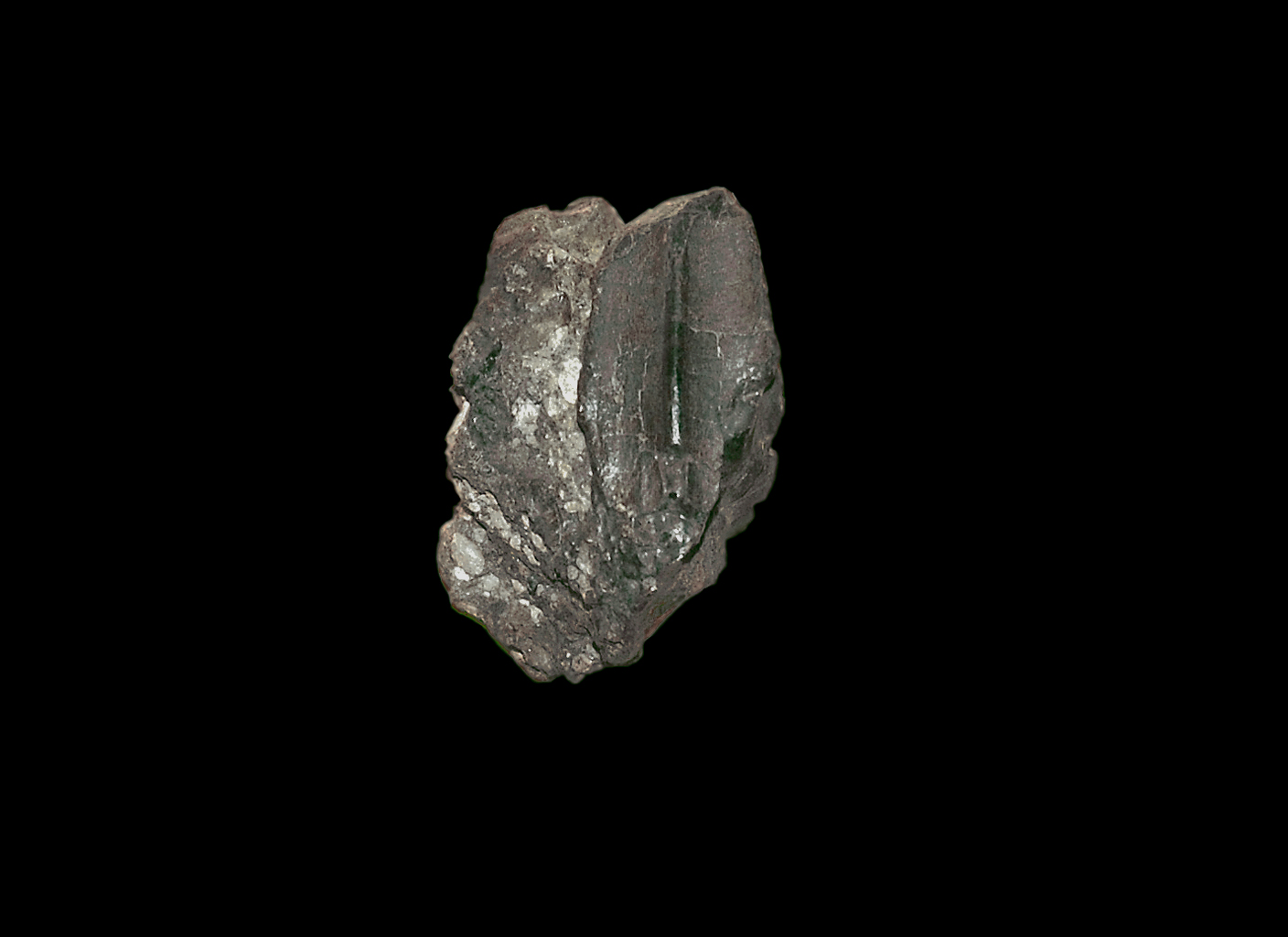
Tooth, Museo Civico di Storia Naturale di Milano

Kritosaurus was discovered in the De-na-zin Member of the Kirtland Formation. This formation dates from the late Campanian stages of the Late Cretaceous Period (74 to 70 million years ago), and is also the source of several other dinosaurs, like Alamosaurus, a species of Parasaurolophus, Pentaceratops, Nodocephalosaurus, Saurornitholestes, and Bistahieversor. The Kirtland Formation is interpreted as river floodplains appearing after a retreat of the Western Interior Seaway. Conifers were the dominant plants, and chasmosaurine horned dinosaurs appear to have been more common than hadrosaurids. The presence of Parasaurolophus and Kritosaurus in northern latitude fossil sites may represent faunal exchange between otherwise distinct northern and southern biomes in Late Cretaceous North America. Both taxa are uncommon outside of the southern biome, where, along with Pentaceratops, they are predominate members of the fauna.

The geographic range of Kritosaurus remains in North America was expanded by the discovery of bones from the late Campanian-age Aguja Formation of Texas, including a skull, although this specimen was given its own genus name, Aquilarhinus, in 2019. Additionally, a partial skull from Coahuila, Mexico has been referred to K. navajovius.

Since the 1910s and 1930s, Barnum Brown described that an unsubscribed species of Kritosaurus, the most likely candidate being Kritosaurus navajovius, had inhabited the late Maastrichtian Ojo Alamo Formation, where the first specimen of Kritosaurus was unearthed, in New Mexico as well as the Javelina Formation and the El Picacho Formation in Texas, which was a flood plain type environment at the time of the Cretaceous. Charles W. Gilmore also made notes about Brown's work surveys and finds from the Ojo Alamo Formation whilst doing research in the North Horn Formation in Utah as well as researching the Ojo Alamo Formation himself. These fossils might be of an unknown species of hadrosaur or an undescribed specimen of Kritosaurus or Kritosaurus navajovius. However, not all of the paleontological community agrees with the age of the Kritosaurus holotype unearthed by Barnum Brown. This is due to the unconformity that divides the Ojo Alamo Formation into two parts; the older Naashoibito member, which overlies the Campanian era Kirtland Formation, and the younger Kimbeto member. Starting in the 2000s and 2010s, more research into this area as well as nearby fossil formations in neighboring states has brought more information about them to light. This issue will probably be resolved in the future.

However, confirmed Kritosaurus remains, possibly belonging to K. navajovius, cf. K. navajovius, and possibly a new species have been unearthed in the Javelina Formation and the El Picacho Formation in Texas. This genus lived alongside numerous species of dinosaurs including the sauropod Alamosaurus, the ceratopsians Bravoceratops, Ojoceratops, Torosaurus and a possible species of Eotriceratops, hadrosaurs which included a possible species of Edmontosaurus annectens, a hadrosaur very similar to Saurolophus and Gryposaurus, Gryposaurus alsatei to be exact, and the armored nodosaur Glyptodontopelta. Theropods from this environment which included Tyrannosaurus, smaller theropods like a species of Troodon and Richardoestesia, the oviraptorid Ojoraptorsaurus, the dromaeosaur Dineobellator, and indeterminate ornithomimids and other undescribed dromaeosaurs. Non-dinosaur species that had shared the same environment with Kritosaurus included the giant pterosaur Quetzalcoatlus, various species of fishes and rays, amphibians, lizards, turtles like Adocus, and multiple species of mammals like Alphadon and Mesodma.

== See also ==
- Timeline of hadrosaur research
