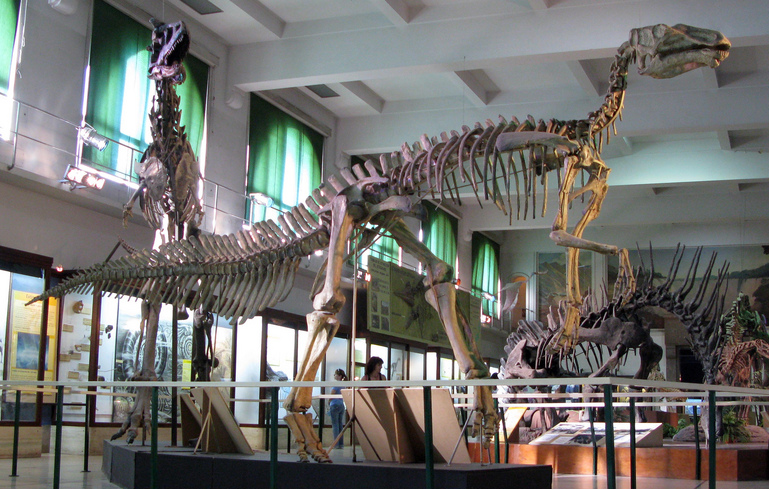
- Reconstructed skeleton at Natural Sciences Museum

Scientific classification
- Kingdom: Animalia
- Phylum: Chordata
- Class: Reptilia
- Clade: Dinosauria
- Clade: †Ornithischia
- Clade: †Ornithopoda
- Family: †Hadrosauridae
- Subfamily: †Saurolophinae
- Clade: †Austrokritosauria
- Genus: †Huallasaurus; Rozadilla et al., 2022
- Species: †H. australis

Binomial name
- †Huallasaurus australis (Bonaparte et al., 1984)

Synonyms
- Kritosaurus australis Bonaparte et al., 1984; Secernosaurus australis (Bonaparte et al., 1984) Wagner, 2001

= Huallasaurus =

Huallasaurus Temporal range: Late Cretaceous, ~85–66 Ma

Extinct genus of dinosaur

Huallasaurus (meaning "duck lizard") is an extinct genus of saurolophine hadrosaur that lived during the Late Cretaceous of the Los Alamitos Formation of Patagonia in Argentina. The type and only species is H. australis.

Originally named as a species of Kritosaurus in 1984, it was long considered a synonym of Secernosaurus before being recognized as its own distinct genus in a 2022 study, different from other members of Kritosaurini.

== Discovery ==
The generic name, "Huallasaurus," combines "hualla," the Mapudungun word for "duck," and the Greek "sauros," meaning "lizard." The specific name, "australis," is derived from the Latin "australis," meaning "southern," after the discovery of the holotype specimen in southern Argentina.

== Classification ==
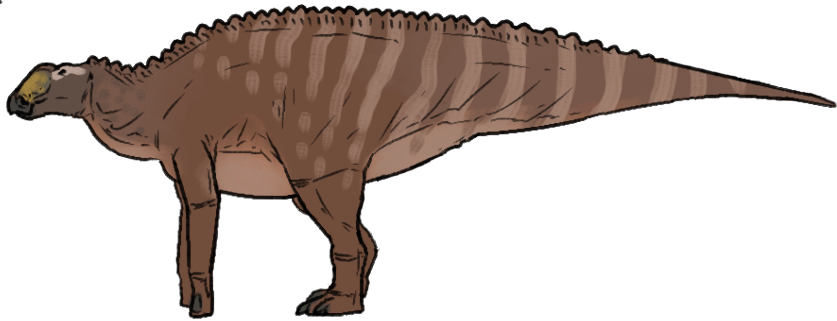
Life restoration

Rozadilla et al. (2022) named Huallasaurus and the closely related Kelumapusaura, recovering them in a clade of entirely South American saurolophines. In the 2023 description of the South American hadrosauroid Gonkoken, Alarcón-Muñoz et al. recovered similar results, implementing a modified version of the phylogenetic matrix of Rozadilla et al. They named the clade containing Huallasaurus, Kelumapusaura, and other South American saurolophines as the Austrokritosauria, recovering it as the sister taxon to the Kritosaurini. The results of their phylogenetic analyses of Saurolophinae are displayed in the cladogram below:

- Saurolophinae
  - - - Wulagasaurus
      - Acristavus
    - - Maiasaura
      - - Probrachylophosaurus
        - Brachylophosaurus
  - - - Austrokritosauria
        - Secernosaurus
        - - Bonapartesaurus
          - - Kelumapusaura
            - Huallasaurus
      - Kritosaurini
        - Kritosaurus
        - - - Rhinorex
            - Gryposaurus latidens
          - - Gryposaurus notabilis
            - Gryposaurus monumentensis
    - - Kamuysaurus
      - - - Prosaurolophus
          - - Saurolophus osborni
            - Saurolophus angustirostris
        - - - Laiyangosaurus
            - Kerberosaurus
          - - Shantungosaurus
            - - Edmontosaurus regalis
              - Edmontosaurus annectens

== Description ==
=== Vertabral microanatomy ===
The internal microanatomy of Huallasaurus vertebra from three specimens were examined by Aureliano et al. 2026 using computed tomography. It was found that the internal structure had a relatively dense trabecular architecture and a lack of invasive pneumaticity across the centra, neural arches, and neural spines. The internal pattern is more similar to silesaurs (such as Silesaurus) more than that of other archosauriforms. It is currently an open question weather these similarity show a deep phylogenetic relationship or convergent evolutions between the groups. It seems that these observations are consistent with the hypothesis that the air sac diverticula did not evolve in the clade Ornithischia and instead supports the proposed “pelvic bellows” ventilation hypothesis. Their large body sizes and accommodated intraosseous fat reserves may have been supported by a combination of a dense trabecular matrix and thin cortical walls and the lack of invasive air sacs.

They also show superficial similarities to the trabecular structure that are seen in some large mammal species with their expanded trabecular matrix and remarkably thin cortical walls. However their functional equivalence is speculative.

== Paleoecology ==
Huallasaurus is known from the Late Cretaceous Los Alamitos Formation of Río Negro Province, Argentina. Aeolosaurus rionegrinus, a titanosaurian sauropod, has also been named from this formation.
