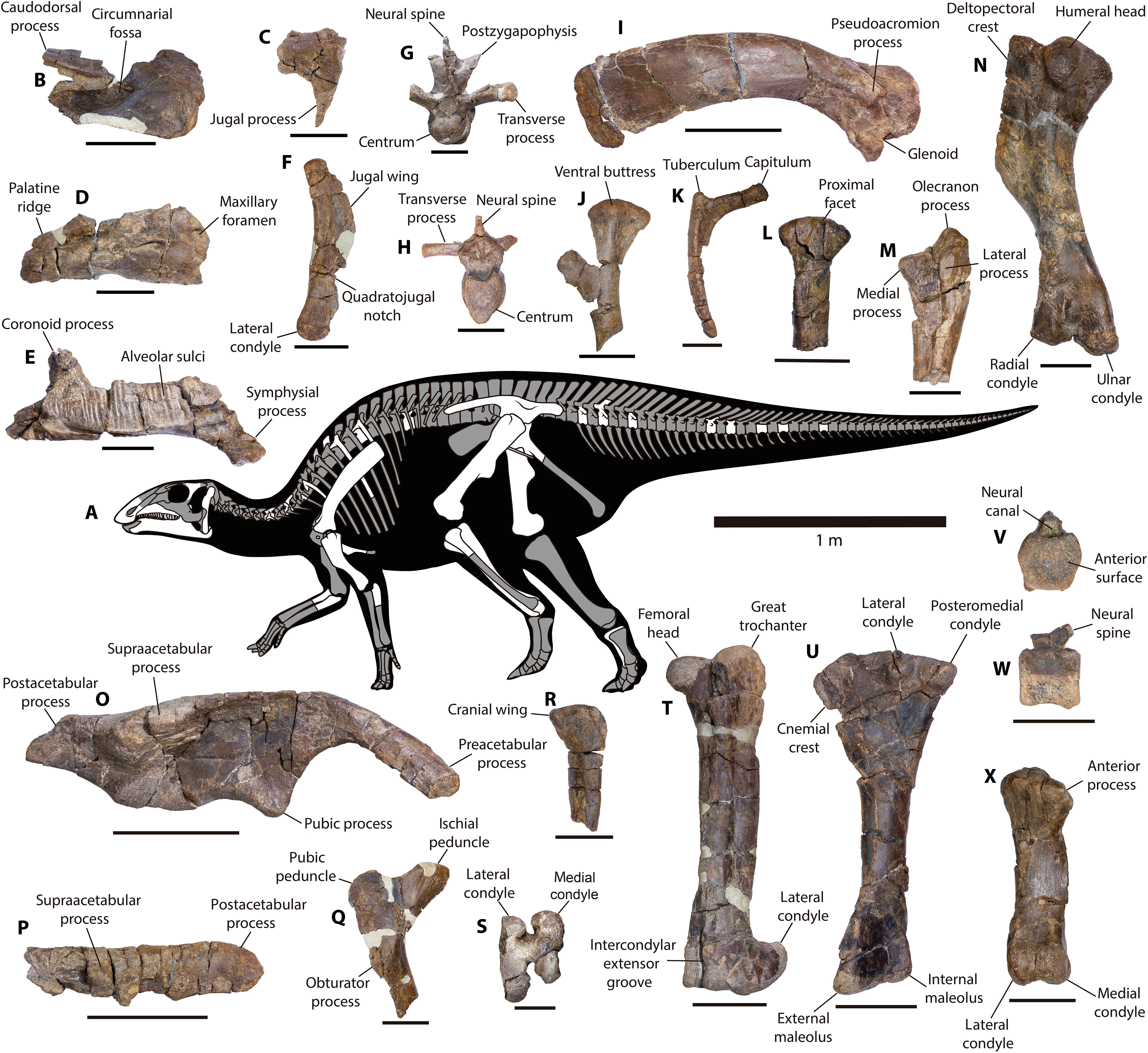
- Skeletal diagram and known bones

Scientific classification
- Kingdom: Animalia
- Phylum: Chordata
- Class: Reptilia
- Clade: Dinosauria
- Clade: †Ornithischia
- Clade: †Ornithopoda
- Superfamily: †Hadrosauroidea
- Genus: †Gonkoken; Alarcón-Muñoz et al., 2023
- Species: †G. nanoi

Binomial name
- †Gonkoken nanoi Alarcón-Muñoz et al., 2023

= Gonkoken =

Gonkoken Temporal range: Late Cretaceous (Maastrichtian), ~71.7–66 Ma

Genus of hadrosauroid dinosaurs

Gonkoken (meaning "similar to a wild duck or swan") is an extinct genus of hadrosauroid ornithopod dinosaur from the Late Cretaceous Dorotea Formation of Chilean Patagonia. The genus contains a single species, Gonkoken nanoi, known from disarticulated bones of multiple individuals.

== Discovery and naming ==
The Gonkoken fossil specimens were discovered beginning in 2013 in sediments of the Dorotea Formation in the Río de las Chinas Valley, Estancia Cerro Guido, in Magallanes Region, Chile. The holotype specimen, CPAP 3054, consists of a right ilium. Additional material assigned as paratype includes the disarticulated bones of at least three individuals. These bones include skull material, cervical, dorsal, and caudal vertebrae, ribs, partial pectoral and pelvic girdles, and arm and leg bones.

In 2023, Alarcón-Muñoz et al. described Gonkoken nanoi as a new genus and species of hadrosauroid ornithopod based on these fossil remains. The generic name, "Gonkoken", combines the Aónik'enk words "gon", meaning "same as" or "similar to" and "koken", meaning "wild duck" or "swan". The specific name, "nanoi", honors Mario "Nano" Ulloa.

== Description ==
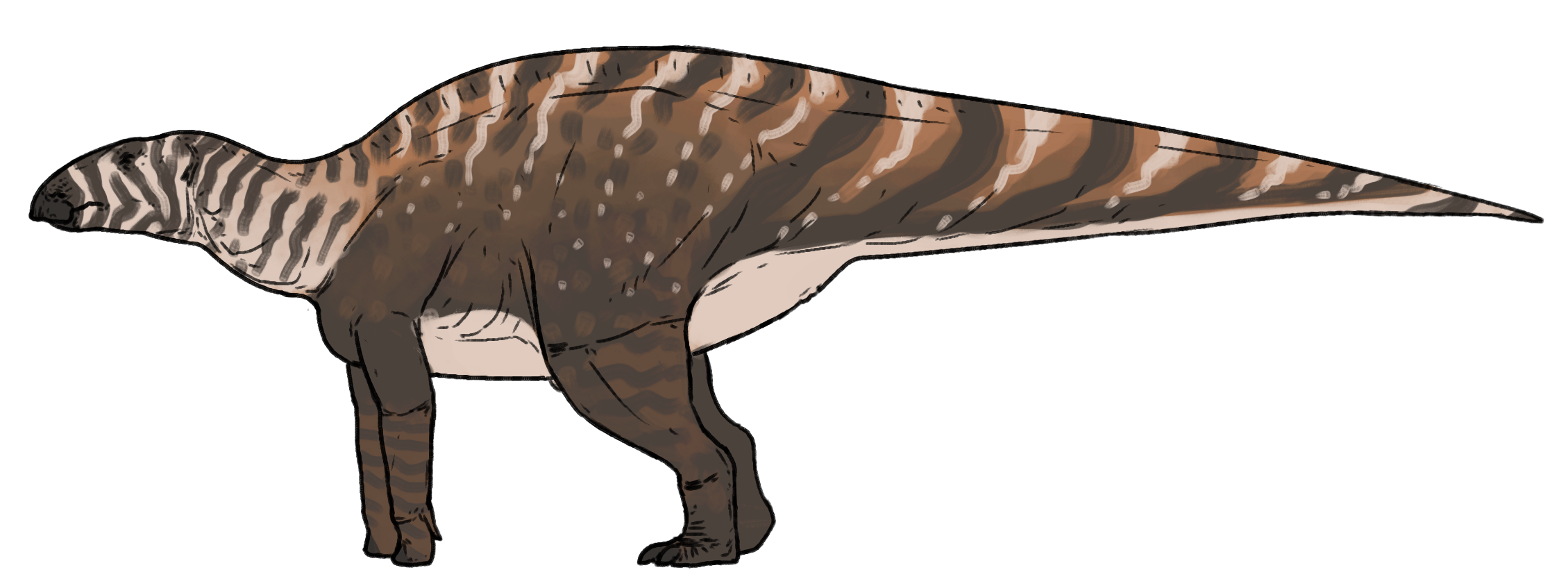
Life restoration

Gonkoken was a relatively small hadrosauroid, with an approximate body length of 4 metres (13 ft). It exhibits a blend of derived hadrosaurid traits and ancestral hadrosauroid traits.

== Classification ==
Alarcón-Muñoz et al. (2023) recovered Gonkoken as a derived, non-hadrosaurid hadrosauroid, proving that these taxa survived until the very end of the Cretaceous in southern South America. It was thus unrelated to other the South American hadrosaurids, Bonapartesaurus, Huallasaurus, Kelumapusaura, and Secernosaurus, which were found to belong to their own group of saurolophine hadrosaurids called Austrokritosauria. Both groups likely dispersed to South America from North America. The results of their phylogenetic analyses are shown in the cladogram below, with South American taxa highlighted:

- - Eotrachodon
  - - Gonkoken
    - - Huehuecanauhtlus
      - - Lophorhothon
        - - Hadrosauridae
            - Hadrosaurus
            - - Yamatosaurus
              - - Saurolophinae
                  - - - Wulagasaurus
                      - Acristavus
                    - - Maiasaura
                      - - Probrachylophosaurus
                        - Brachylophosaurus
                  - - - Austrokritosauria
                        - Secernosaurus
                        - - Bonapartesaurus
                          - - Kelumapusaura
                            - Huallasaurus
                      - Kritosaurini
                        - Kritosaurus
                        - - - Rhinorex
                            - Gryposaurus latidens
                          - - Gryposaurus notabilis
                            - Gryposaurus monumentensis
                    - - Kamuysaurus
                      - - - Prosaurolophus
                          - - Saurolophus osborni
                            - Saurolophus angustirostris
                        - - - Laiyangosaurus
                            - Kerberosaurus
                          - - Shantungosaurus
                            - - Edmontosaurus regalis
                              - Edmontosaurus annectens
                - Lambeosaurinae

== Paleoenvironment ==
Gonkoken was discovered in layers of the Dorotea Formation, which dates to the lower Maastrichtian, between 71.7 ± 1.2 and 70.5 ± 5.0 million years ago. The parankylosaur Stegouros has also been described from the formation. Fossils belonging to amphibians, mammals, fish, reptiles, and several invertebrates have also been discovered there, along with material belonging to indeterminate sauropod, theropod, and ornithischian dinosaurs.
