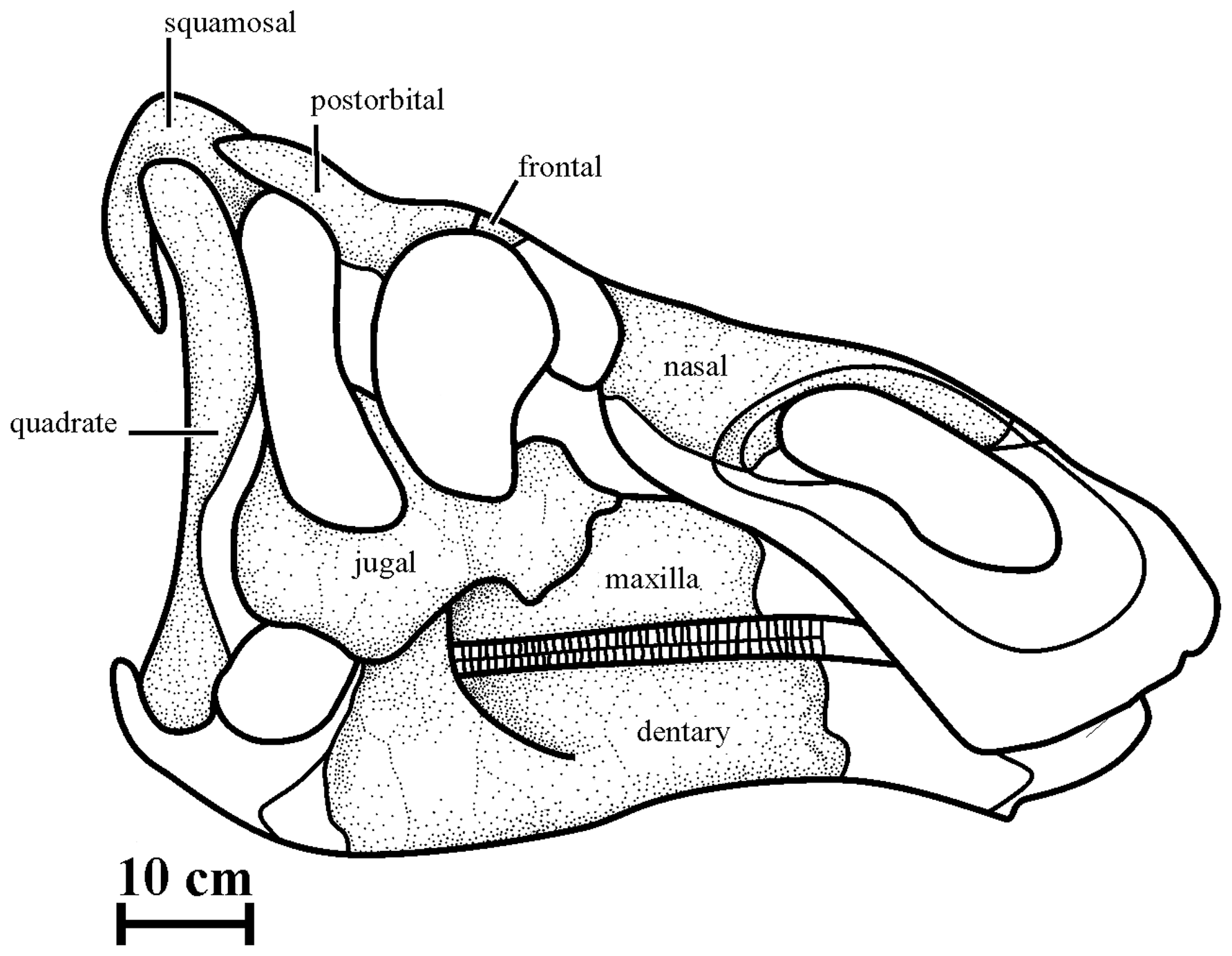
- Restoration of the skull

Scientific classification
- Kingdom: Animalia
- Phylum: Chordata
- Class: Reptilia
- Clade: Dinosauria
- Clade: †Ornithischia
- Clade: †Ornithopoda
- Family: †Hadrosauridae
- Subfamily: †Saurolophinae
- Genus: †Kundurosaurus; Godefroit et al., 2012

Type species
- †Kundurosaurus nagornyi Godefroit et al., 2012

= Kundurosaurus =

Kundurosaurus Temporal range: Late Cretaceous, 67–66 Ma

Extinct genus of dinosaurs

Kundurosaurus is an extinct genus of saurolophine hadrosaurid dinosaur known from the latest Cretaceous (probably late Maastrichtian stage) of Amur Region, Far Eastern Russia. It is a monotypic genus that contains a single species, Kundurosaurus nagornyi.

== Discovery ==
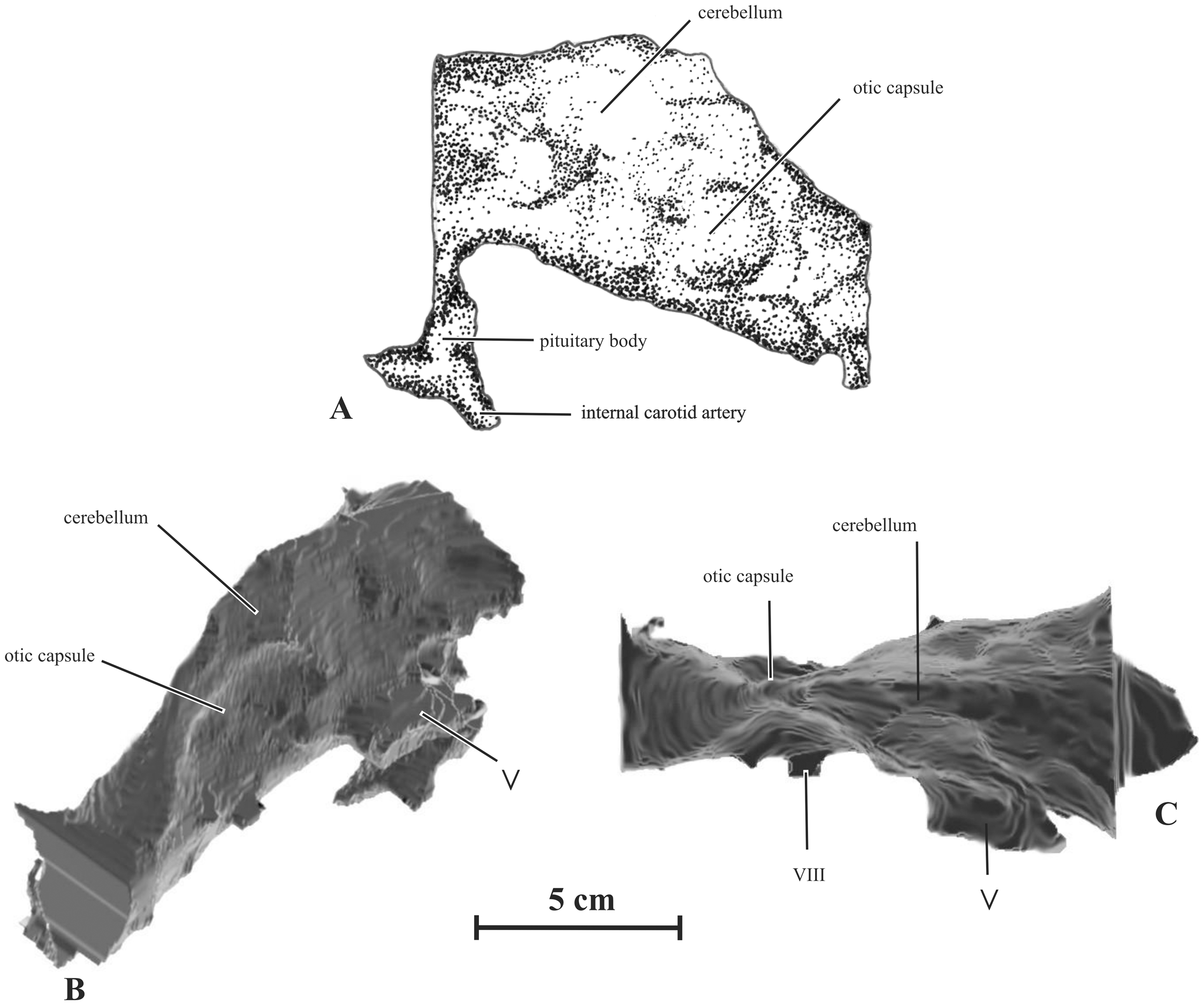
Endocranial reconstruction of AENM 2/121 based on a CT scan.

Kundurosaurus is known from holotype AENM 2/921, a partial, disarticulated skull, including a nearly complete braincase (AENM 2/921 1-2), two quadrates (3-4), squamosal (5), postorbital (6), frontal (7) and parietal (8) bones. The referred specimens are AENM 2/45-46, two jugals; AENM 2/83-84, 2/86, maxillae; AENM 2/57-58, nasals; AENM 2/48, postorbital; AENM 2/19, quadrate; AENM 2/121, 2/928 partial braincases; AENM 2/846, 2/902, dentaries; AENM 2/906, scapula; AENM 2/913, sternal; AENM 2/117, 2/903, 2/907-908, humeri; AENM 2/905, ulna; AENM 2/904, radius; AENM 2/922, nearly complete pelvic girdle and associated sacral elements. These were found at the same level as the holotype, but may belong to other individuals. All specimens are housed in the Amur Natural History Museum of the Institute of Geology and Nature Management, Russia.

Kundurosaurus was first described and named by Pascal Godefroit, Yuri L. Bolotsky and Pascaline Lauters in 2012. The type species is Kundurosaurus nagornyi. The generic name is derived from Kundur, the type and only known locality, and sauros, "lizard" in Ancient Greek. The specific name, nagornyi, honors V.A. Nagorny from the Far Eastern Institute of Mineral Resources, for discovering the Kundur locality in 1990.

Location of hadrosaur localities in the Maastrichtian Zeya-Bureya Basin. Map of Heilongjiang, China, as well as the Amur Region of Russia. Blue dots represent the Yuliangze Formation, and red dots represent the Udurchukan Formation. Wulaga is home to Wulagasaurus and Sahaliyania, Jiayin to Charonosaurus, Kundur to Kundurosaurus and Olorotitan, and Blagoveschensk to Kerberosaurus and Amurosaurus.

All Kundurosaurus specimens were collected in the Kundur locality. The site belongs to the Wodehouseia spinata – Aquilapollenites subtilis palynozone, dating to the Maastrichtian stage, probably the Late Maastrichtian, of the Late Cretaceous period, about 67-66 million years ago. The Kundur site was discovered by Vladimir A. Nagorny in 1990. He collected fossil bones in a road section along the Chita – Khabarovsk highway near the village of Kundur and sent them to Yuri L. Bolotsky. Large-scale excavations started at Kundur in 1999. Besides the abundant Olorotitan arharensis material, it has yielded many disarticulated saurolophine specimens. All these specimens were assigned to Kundurosaurus because the describers considered the recovered material to be homogeneous, and suggested that there is no reason to believe that more than one single saurolophine taxon lived in the Kundur area by latest Cretaceous period.

Kundur is one of four rich dinosaur localities that have been discovered in the southeastern part ("Lower Zeya depression") of Zeya-Bureya sedimentary basin, eastern Asia: Jiayin and Wulaga localities are located in the Yuliangze Formation of northern Heilongjiang Province, China and Blagoveschensk and Kundur localities are located in the Udurchukan Formation of southern Amur Region, Russia. In each locality, the dinosaur fauna is largely dominated by lambeosaurine hadrosaurids (Charonosaurus jiayinensis and some non-diagnostic material of Mandschurosaurus amurensis from Jiayin, Sahaliyania from Wulaga, Amurosaurus from Blagoveschensk, and Olorotitan from Kundur), but the indeterminate hadrosaurid Arkharavia, from Kundur, and saurolophine (non-crested or solid-crested) hadrosaurids are also represented (Saurolophus kryschtofovici and other non-diagnostic material of M. amurensis from Jiayin, Wulagasaurus from Wulaga, Kerberosaurus from Blagoveschensk and Kundurosaurus from Kundur).

== Description ==
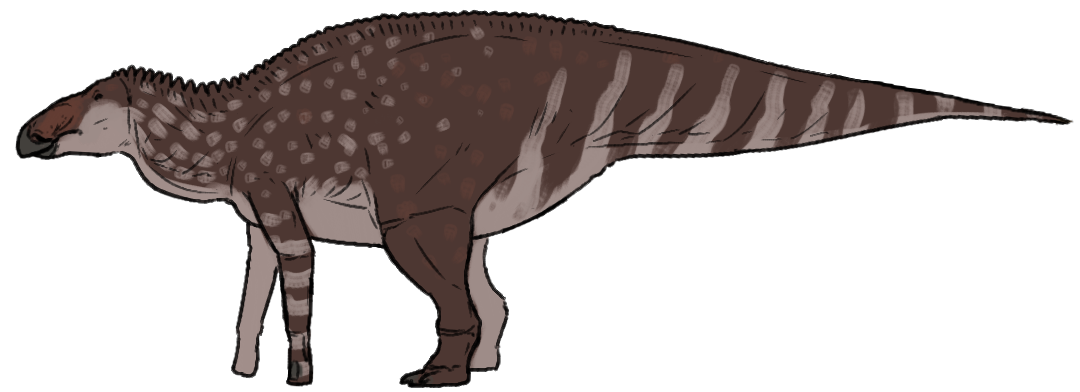
Life restoration

Kundurosaurus was a medium-sized hadrosaur, measuring 7 metres (23 ft) long and weighing 2 metric tons (2.2 short tons). It is a saurolophine diagnosed by four autapomorphies, unique derived traits. It has a prominent and thick ridge on the lateral side of the nasal that borders caudally the circumnasal depression and invades the caudal plate of the nasal. Its caudal buttress of the proximal head of the scapula is oriented quite laterally, parallel to the pseudoacromial process. The preacetabular process of the ilium is straight and only moderately deflected ventrally by an angle of 160°. It does not reach the level of the plane formed by the bases of the iliac and pubic peduncles. Finally, with Kundurosaurus the axis of the postacetabular process of the ilium is strongly twisted along its length, so that its lateral side progressively faces dorsolaterally.

== Classification ==
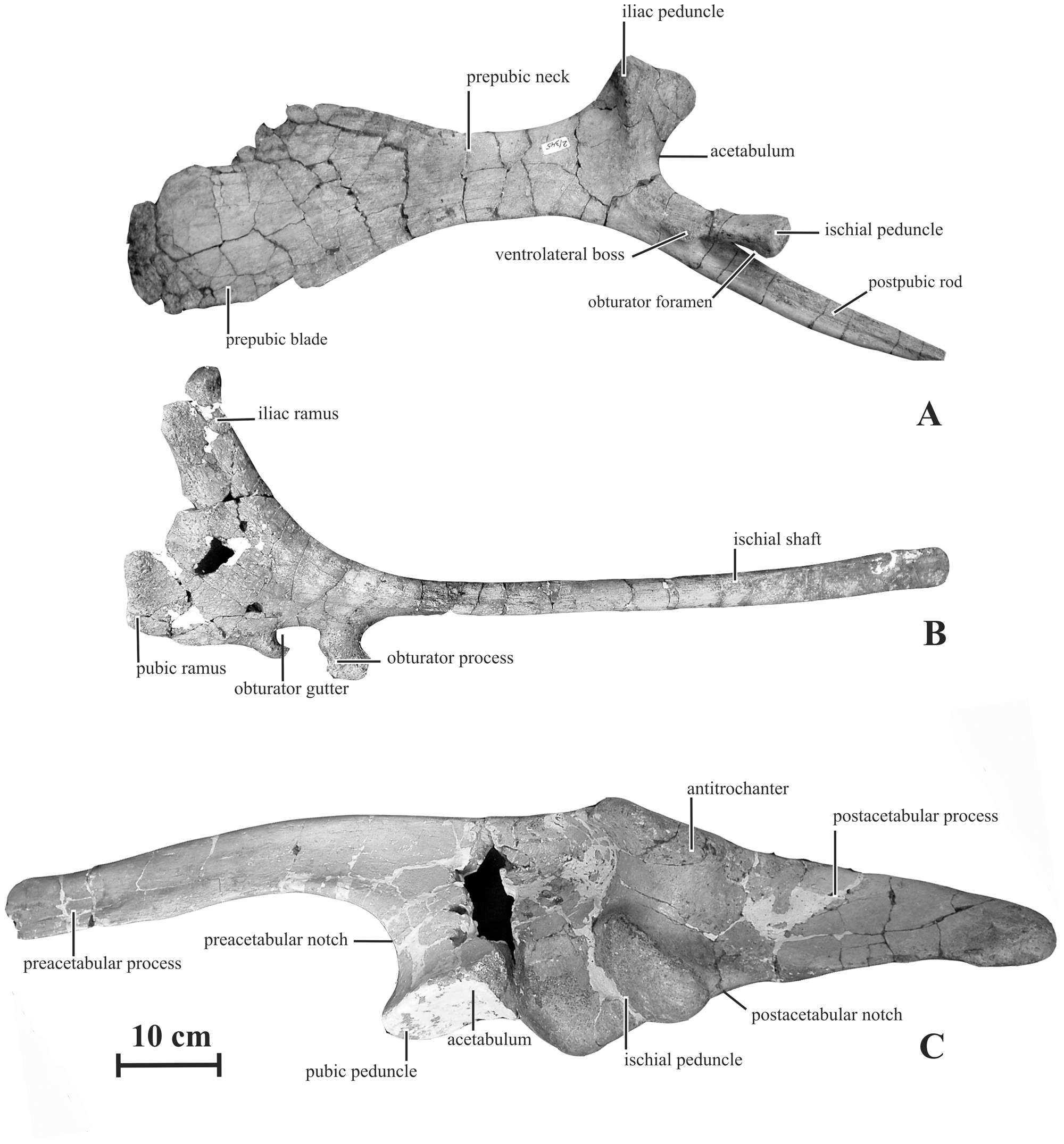
Pelvic girdle of Kundurosaurus: left pubis AENM 2/922-5L (A), left ischium AENM 2/922-3L (B) and the autapomorphic left ilium AENM 2/922-7L (C) in lateral view.

A phylogenetic analysis of saurolophines performed by Godefroit, Bolotsky & Lauters (2012) indicates that Kundurosaurus is nested within a clade including Edmontosaurini and Saurolophini, possibly as a sister-taxon of Kerberosaurus. It is based on the data matrix of Prieto-Márquez (2010), however Prieto-Márquez (2010) recovered Edmontosaurini as a sister-taxon of a monophyletic clade formed by Saurolophini and Kritosaurini while in Godefroit et al. (2012) the Edmontosaurini + Saurolophini clade is well supported and excludes Kritosaurini.

The position of Kundurosaurus within Edmontosaurini collapses when fragmentary taxa are excluded from the analysis. In the full analysis, Kundurosaurus is placed as the sister-taxon of Kerberosaurus, which is known from the same region. It may therefore be postulated that K. nagornyi is a second species of the genus Kerberosaurus. This clade, however, is very weakly supported and synapomorphies uniting both taxa can only been found under optimization. Furthermore, although overlapping materials between the genera are limited to their partial skulls, according to Godefroit et al. (2012) Kundurosaurus can be differentiated from Kerberosaurus on the basis of the rostrocaudally longer and more robust dorsal maxillary process, more robust and more curved downwards nasal, much more robust and proportionally higher quadrate and the strong ridge extends obliquely along the lateral side of the exoccipital condyloid in Kundurosaurus. Additionally, the frontals of Kerberosaurus are particularly narrow and do not participate in the orbital margin, the rostral margin of the parietal is depressed around the contact area with the frontals, and Kerberosaurus has hook-like palatine process.

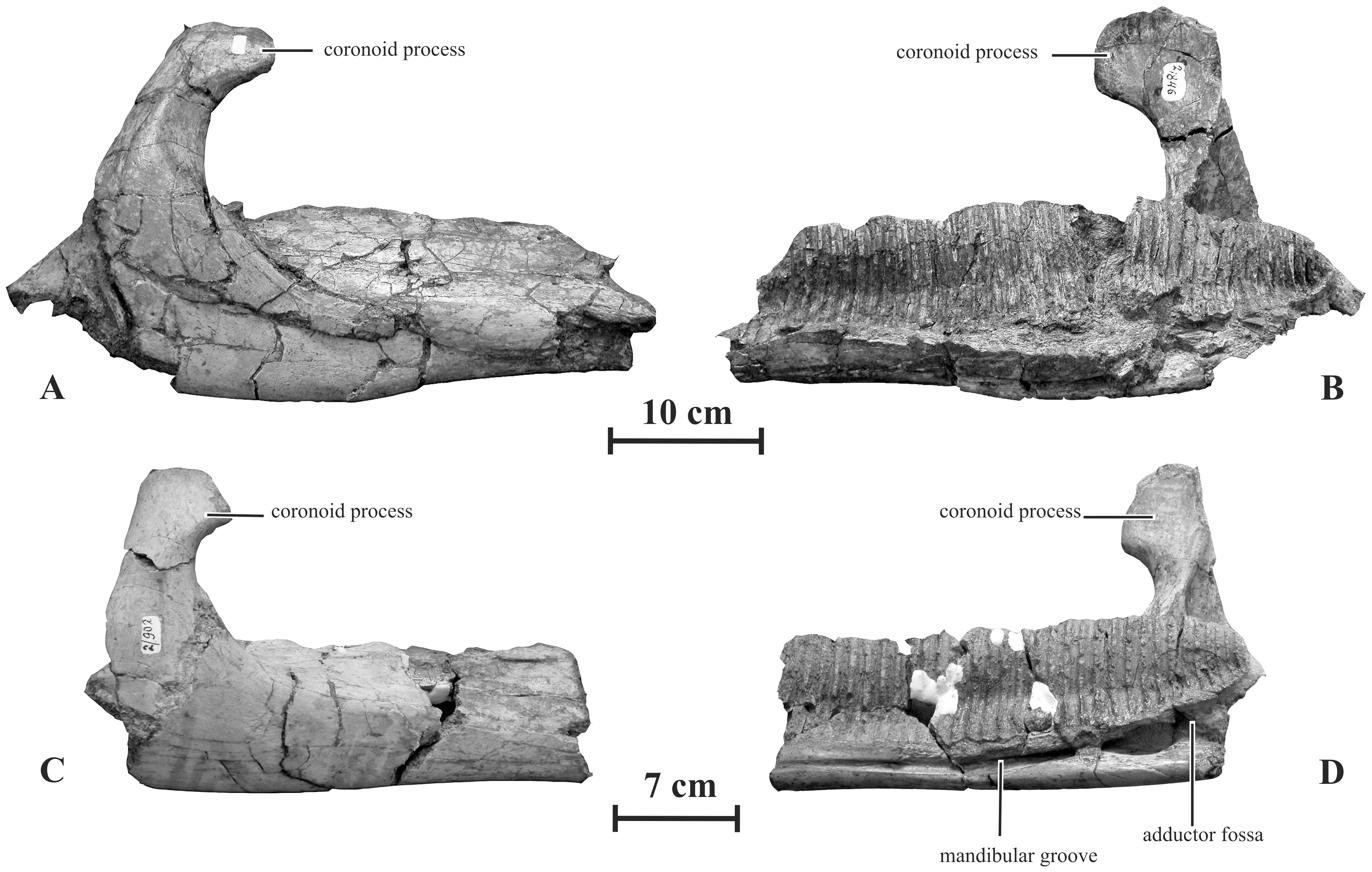
Dentaries AENM 2/846 (A-B) and AENM 2/902 (C-D).

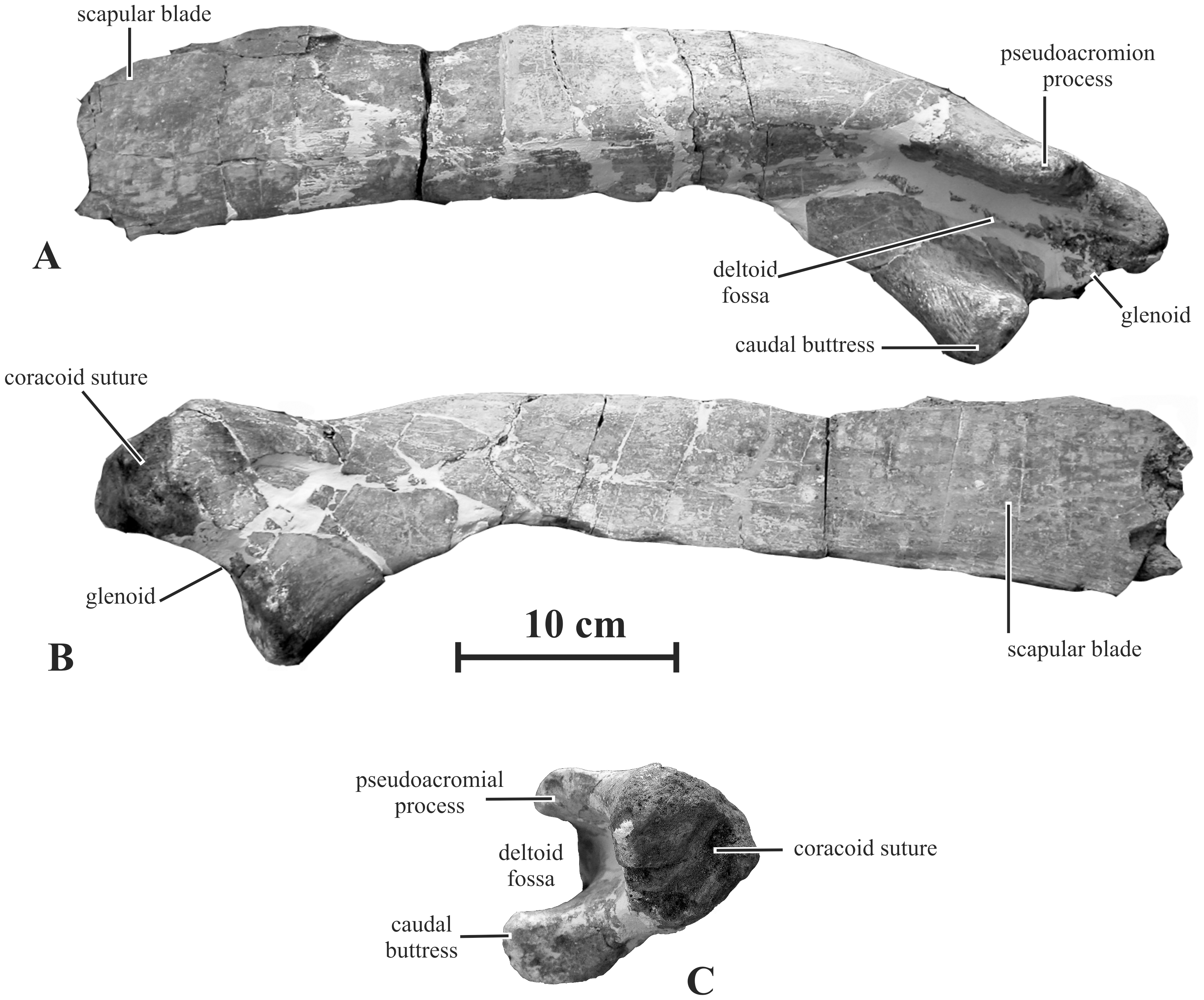
Scapula

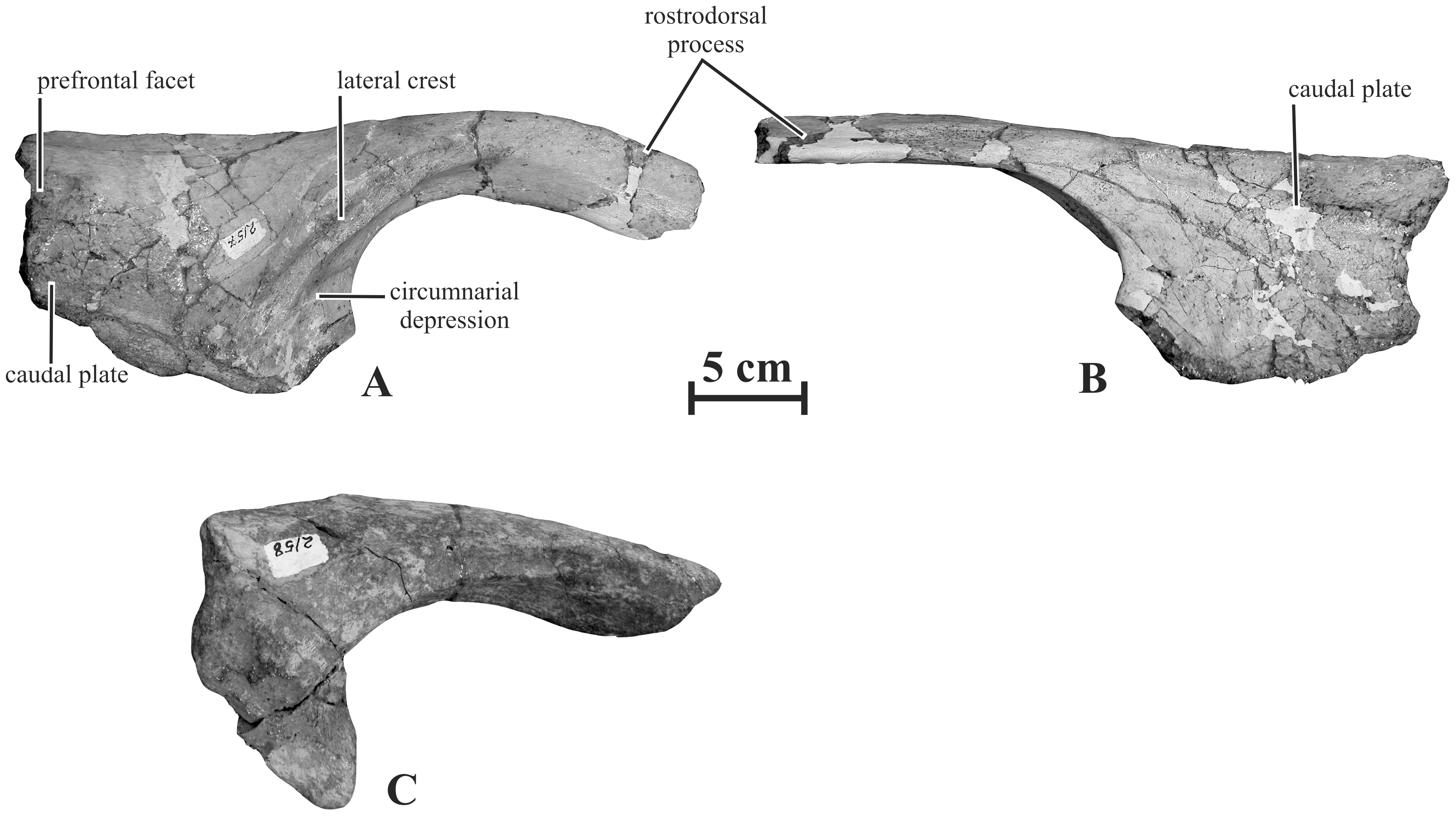
Right nasals

On the other hand, Xing et al. (2014) considered Kundurosaurus nagornyi to be a junior synonym of Kerberosaurus manakini on the basis of their co-occurrence within the same formation and presence of shared characters in their skeletons.

The cladogram below follows Godefroit et al. (2012) analysis.

- - Bactrosaurus
  - Hadrosauridae
    - Hadrosaurinae
      - Hadrosaurus
      - Lophorhothon
    - Saurolophidae
      - Lambeosaurinae
      - Saurolophinae
        - Wulagasaurus
        - - Brachylophosaurini
            - Acristavus
            - - Maiasaura
              - Brachylophosaurus
          - - Kritosaurus
            - - - Gryposaurus latidens
                - - Gryposaurus notabilis
                  - Gryposaurus monumentensis
              - - Saurolophini
                  - Prosaurolophus
                  - - Saurolophus angustirostris
                    - Saurolophus osborni
                - Edmontosaurini
                  - - Kerberosaurus
                    - Kundurosaurus
                  - - Edmontosaurus annectens
                    - Edmontosaurus regalis

== Palaeobiology ==
Bioerosional traces on the maxilla of a Kundurosaurus indicates that it was gnawed on by multituberculates.

== See also ==
- Timeline of hadrosaur research
