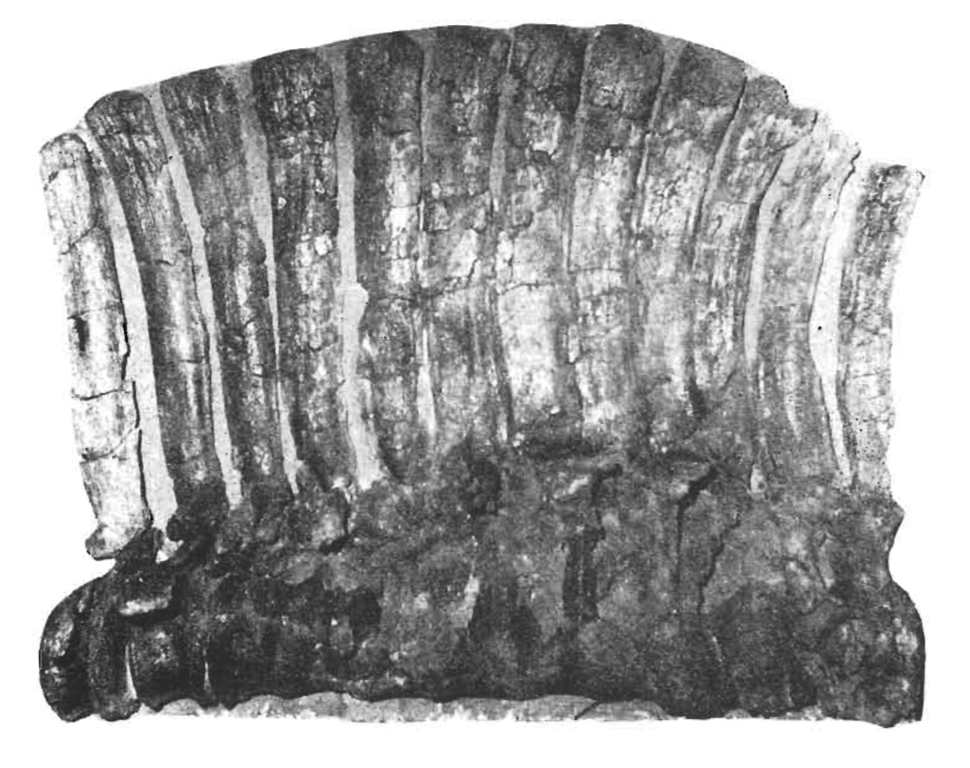
- Sacrum of the holotype

Scientific classification
- Kingdom: Animalia
- Phylum: Chordata
- Class: Reptilia
- Clade: Dinosauria
- Clade: †Ornithischia
- Clade: †Ornithopoda
- Family: †Hadrosauridae
- Subfamily: †Saurolophinae
- Genus: †Barsboldia; Maryańska & Osmólska, 1981

Type species
- †Barsboldia sicinskii Maryańska & Osmólska, 1981

= Barsboldia =

Barsboldia Temporal range: Late Cretaceous, Maastrichtian

Extinct genus of dinosaurs

Barsboldia (meaning "of Barsbold", a well-known Mongolian paleontologist) is a genus of large hadrosaurid dinosaur from the Maastrichtian Nemegt Formation of Ömnogöv, Mongolia. It is known from a partial vertebral column, partial pelvis, and some ribs.

== Discovery ==
In 1970, a Polish-Mongolian expedition near the Nemegt found the skeleton of an ornithopod and first assigned it to Saurolophus angustirostris. However, two Polish paleontologists, Teresa Maryańska and Halszka Osmólska, came to the conclusion that it was a lambeosaurine that had to represent a separate species. They named and described Barsboldia sicinskii based on the holotype specimen ZPAL MgD-1/110. The genus name honors the Mongolian paleontologist Rinchen Barsbold, while the species name honors Wojciech Siciński, the technician at the Warsaw Paleobiological Institute who prepared the skeleton. The holotype specimen, found in a layer of the Nemegt Formation dating to the Maastrichtian, consisted of a partial skeleton consisting of nine back vertebrae, nine hip vertebrae, fifteen tail vertebrae, a left ilium, parts of the left and right pubis, several ribs, and a few fragments of the hind limbs, with the backbone largely articulated. The anterior and posteriormost portions of the skeleton were lost due to erosion.

== Description ==
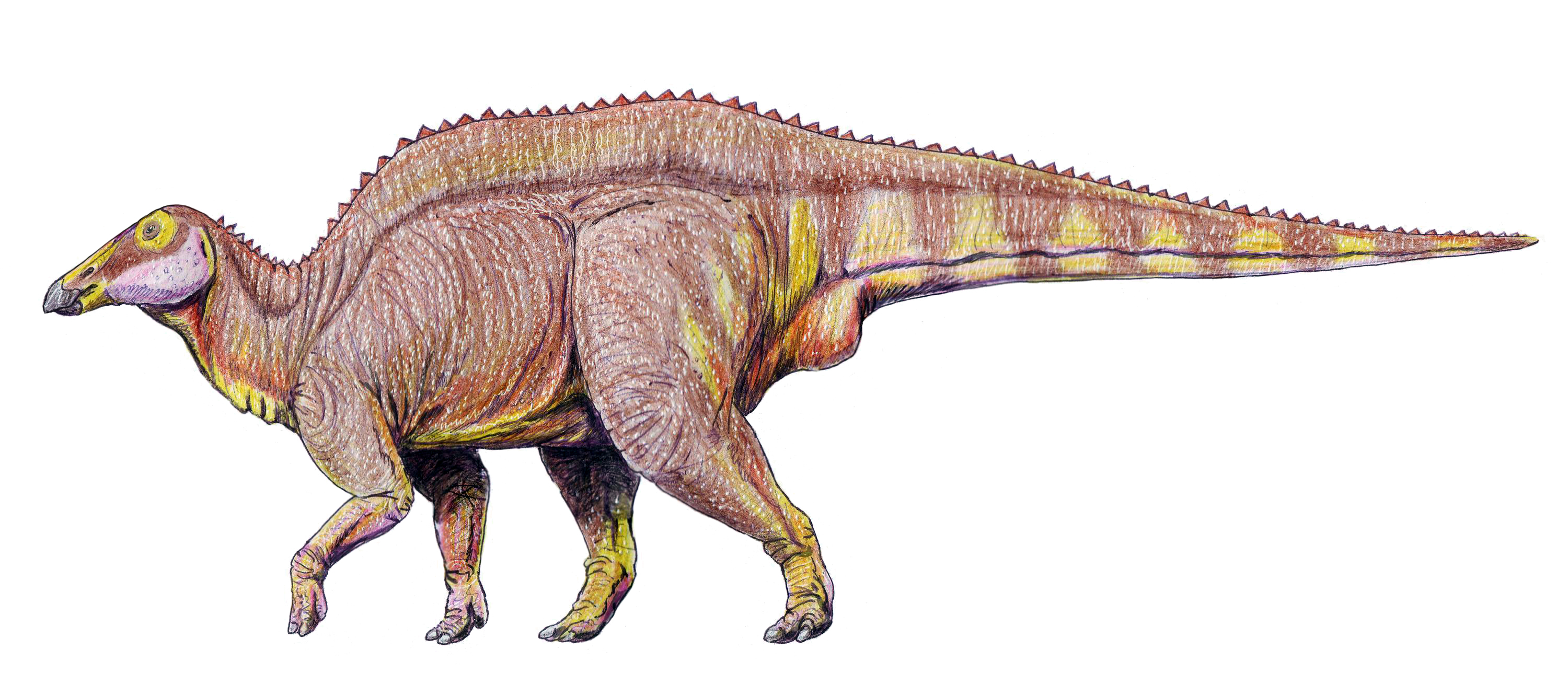
Restoration

Barsboldia was a large hadrosaur, previously estimated at 10 metres (33 ft) in length and 5 metric tons (5.5 short tons) in body mass. In 2011, the tibial length was measured at 1.4 m (4.6 ft), rivaling that of Shantungosaurus at 1.47 m (4.8 ft) and that of Magnapaulia at 1.36 m (4.5 ft); this indicates that Barsboldia could have possibly reached within the range of 12–14 metres (39–46 ft) in total body length. Similar to Ouranosaurus, the most distinctive features of Barsboldia are found in the neural spines. These are very tall, particularly over the hips, and were described as second only to those of Hypacrosaurus altispinus and the tips of those found in the first few vertebrae of the tail are club-shaped, possibly a sign of old age.

== Phylogeny ==
Maryańska and Osmólska described their new genus as a lambeosaurine (or hollow-crested duckbill), the first from the Nemegt Formation, although it lacked a skull. However, the sacrum has a keel along the bottom, a possible lambeosaurine feature, and the bones closely resemble those of Hypacrosaurus. With only one partial skeleton known, and no skull, the genus has been considered dubious or a possible lambeosaurine of uncertain placement. A newer study published in 2011 suggests that Barsboldia is actually a valid saurolophine.

The following cladogram was recovered in the 2011 phylogenetic analysis of Hadrosauroidea by Prieto-Márquez (the relationships within Lambeosaurinae and between basal hadrosauroids aren't shown).

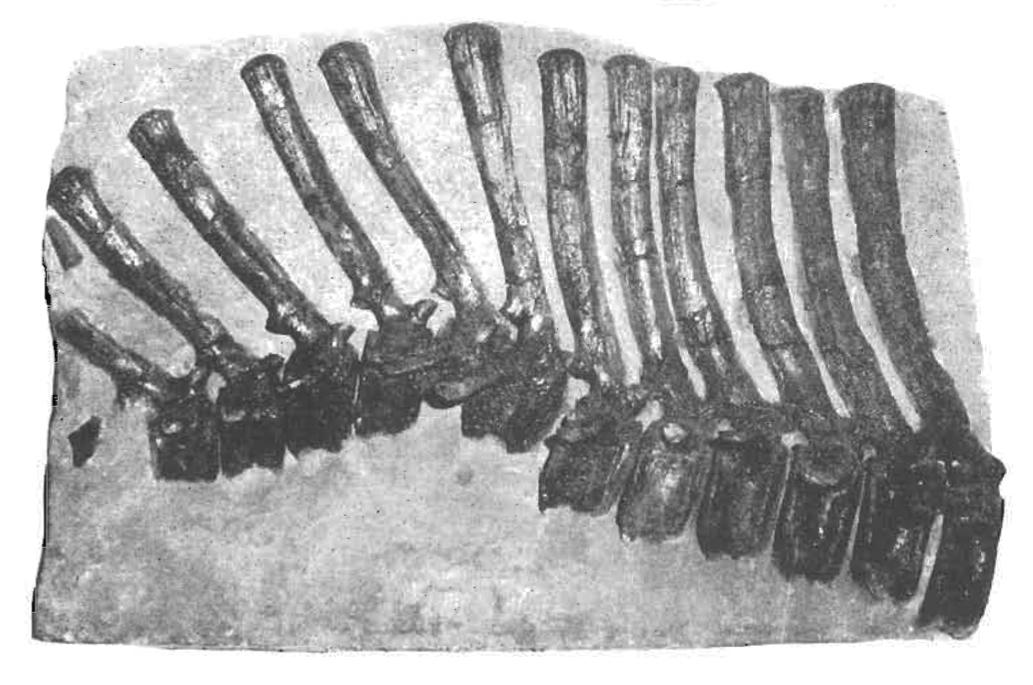
Caudal vertebrae

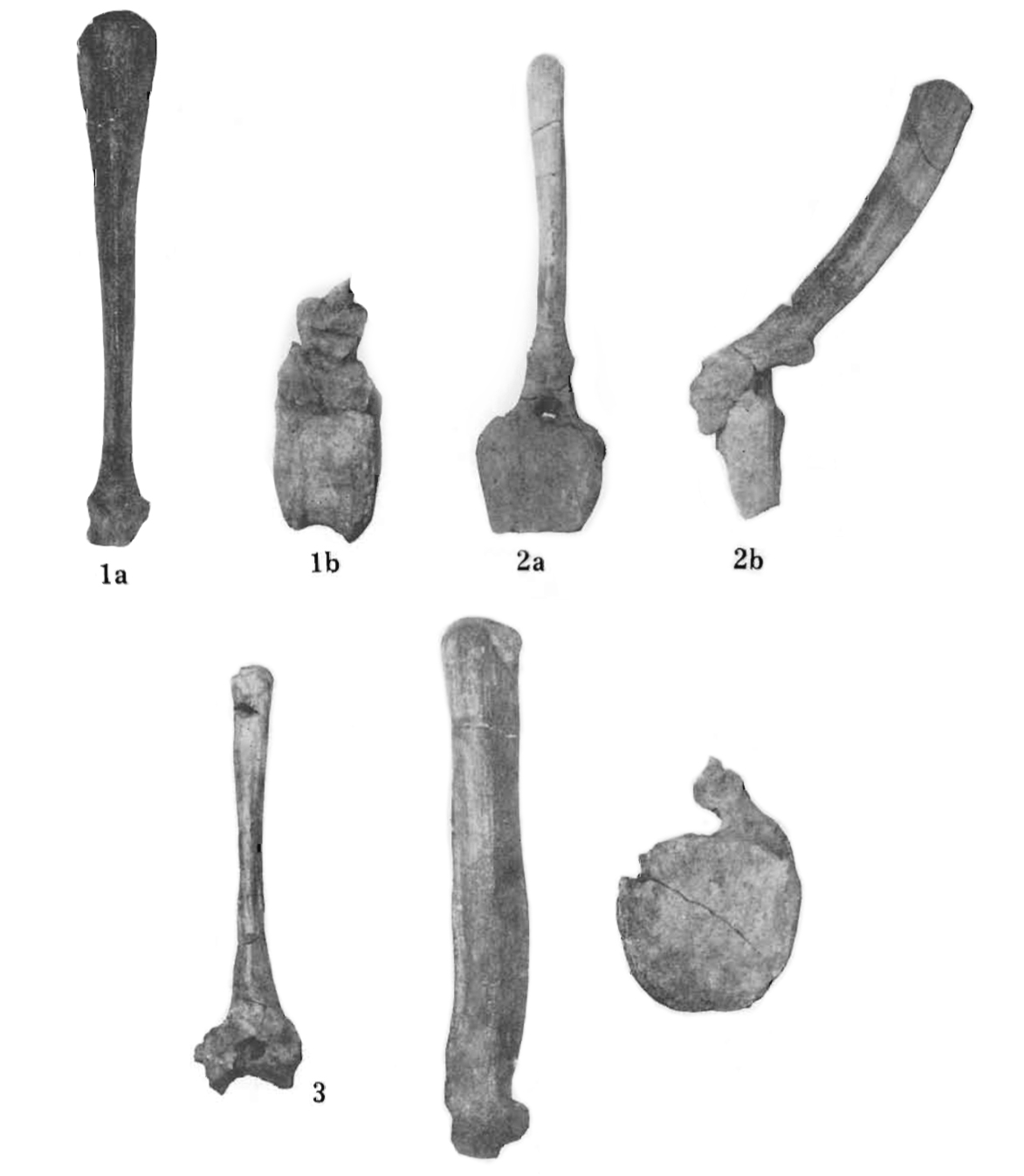
Vertebrae

- - Telmatosaurus
  - - Lophorhothon
    - Hadrosauridae
      - Hadrosaurus
      - Saurolophidae
        - Lambeosaurinae
        - Saurolophinae
          - - Maiasaura
            - Brachylophosaurus
          - - Barsboldia
            - - Shantungosaurus
              - - - Edmontosaurus annectens
                  - Edmontosaurus regalis
                - - - Unnamed Sabinas species
                    - - Kerberosaurus
                      - - Prosaurolophus
                        - - Saurolophus osborni
                          - Saurolophus angustirostris
                  - - Wulagasaurus
                    - - Kritosaurus
                      - - - Gryposaurus latidens
                          - - Gryposaurus notabilis
                            - Gryposaurus monumentensis
                        - - Aquilarhinus
                          - - Secernosaurus
                            - Willinakaqe (=Salitral Moreno species)

== Paleobiology ==
As a hadrosaurid, Barsboldia would have been a large bipedal/quadrupedal herbivore, eating plants with a sophisticated skull that permitted a grinding motion analogous to chewing, and was furnished with hundreds of continually-replaced teeth. If it was a lambeosaurine, it would have had a hollow crest formed out of expanded skull bones containing the nasal passages, with a function relating to identification by sight and sound.

== See also ==
- Timeline of hadrosaur research

== Depictions in media ==
Barsboldia is notably depicted in Path Of Titans as a large, herbivorous dinosaur that, when played right, can kill any vanilla dinosaur in the game.
