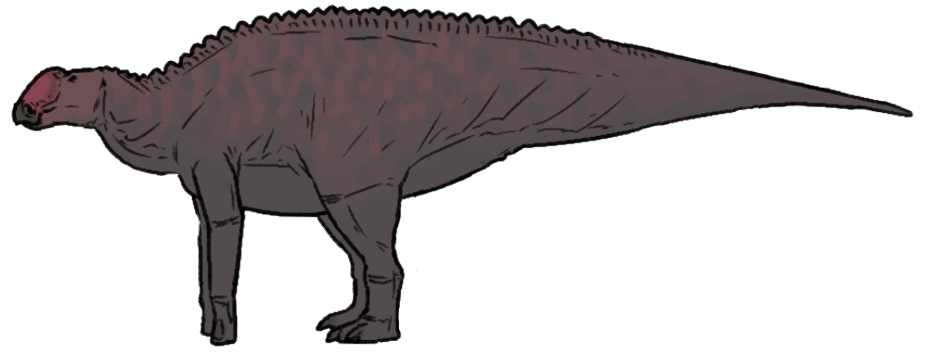
- Life restoration

Scientific classification
- Kingdom: Animalia
- Phylum: Chordata
- Class: Reptilia
- Clade: Dinosauria
- Clade: †Ornithischia
- Clade: †Ornithopoda
- Family: †Hadrosauridae
- Subfamily: †Saurolophinae
- Clade: †Austrokritosauria
- Genus: †Kelumapusaura; Rozadilla et al., 2022
- Species: †K. machi

Binomial name
- †Kelumapusaura machi Rozzadilla et al., 2022

= Kelumapusaura =

Kelumapusaura Temporal range: Late Cretaceous, Maastrichtian

Extinct genus of dinosaur

Kelumapusaura (meaning "red earth lizard") is a genus of saurolophine hadrosaur from the Late Cretaceous Allen Formation in what is now Patagonia in Argentina. The type and only species is K. machi, known from a bonebed of various individuals.

== Discovery ==
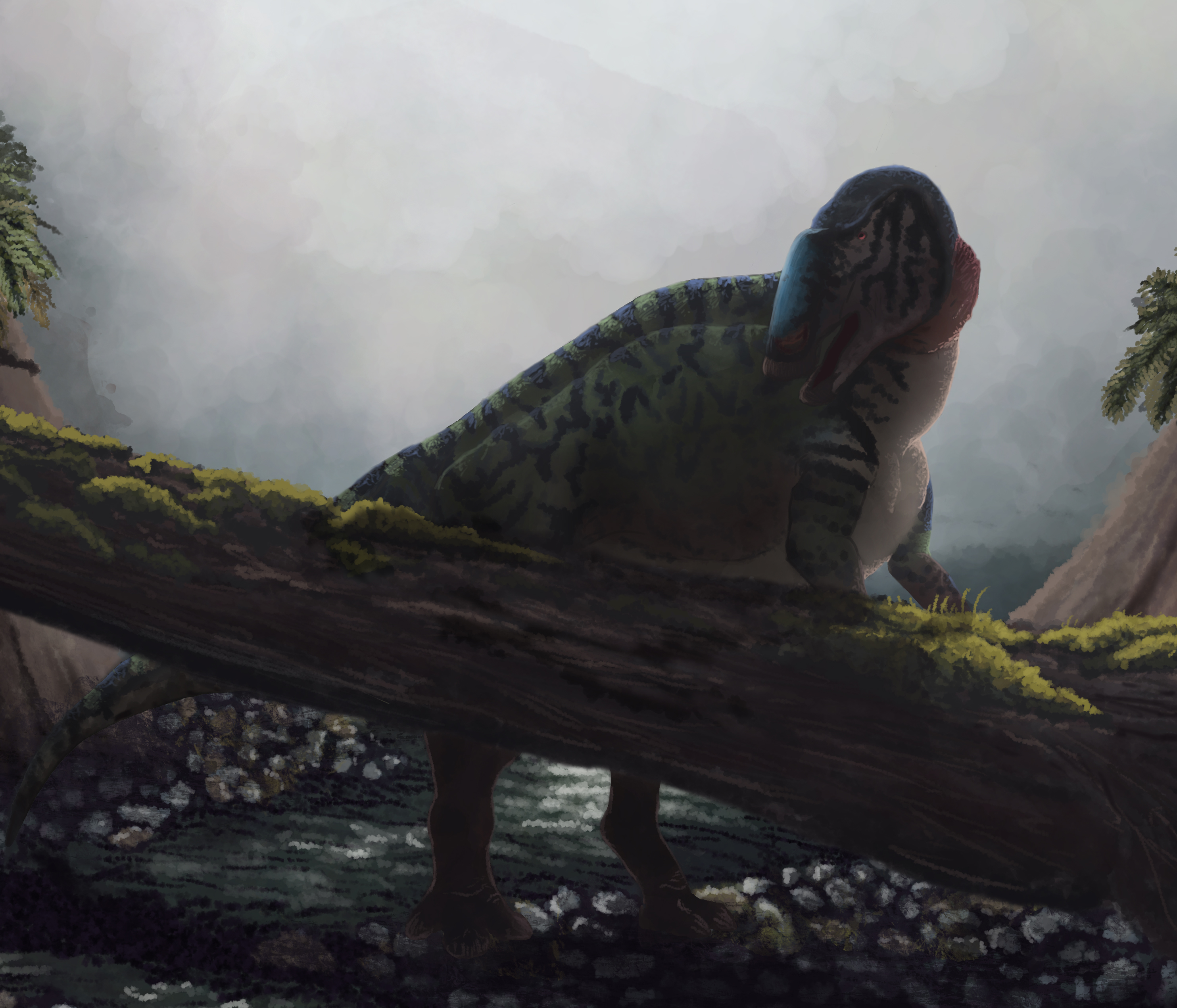
Kelumapusaura in its environment

The generic name, "Kelumapusaura," combines "kelumapu," the Mapudungun word for "red earth," and the feminine form of the Greek "sauros," meaning "lizard." The specific name, "machi," is derived from a word from the Mapuche people for "shaman."

== Description ==
The describing authors estimate that Kelumapusaura would have been 8 to 9 metres (26 to 30 ft) long.

== Classification ==
Rozadilla et al. (2022) named Kelumapusaura and the closely related Huallasaurus, recovering them in a clade of entirely South American saurolophines. In the 2023 description of the South American hadrosauroid Gonkoken, Alarcón-Muñoz et al. recovered similar results, implementing a modified version of the phylogenetic matrix of Rozadilla et al. They named the clade containing Kelumapusaura, Huallasaurus, and other South American saurolophines as the Austrokritosauria, recovering it as the sister taxon to the Kritosaurini. The results of their phylogenetic analyses of Saurolophinae are displayed in the cladogram below:

- Saurolophinae
  - - - Wulagasaurus
      - Acristavus
    - - Maiasaura
      - - Probrachylophosaurus
        - Brachylophosaurus
  - - - Austrokritosauria
        - Secernosaurus
        - - Bonapartesaurus
          - - Kelumapusaura
            - Huallasaurus
      - Kritosaurini
        - Kritosaurus
        - - - Rhinorex
            - Gryposaurus latidens
          - - Gryposaurus notabilis
            - Gryposaurus monumentensis
    - - Kamuysaurus
      - - - Prosaurolophus
          - - Saurolophus osborni
            - Saurolophus angustirostris
        - - - Laiyangosaurus
            - Kerberosaurus
          - - Shantungosaurus
            - - Edmontosaurus regalis
              - Edmontosaurus annectens

== Paleoecology ==
Kelumapusaura is known from the Late Cretaceous Allen Formation of Río Negro Province, Argentina. Many other dinosaurs, including titanosaurs, hadrosaurids, abelisaurids, dromaeosaurids, and alvarezsaurids have been named from the formation.

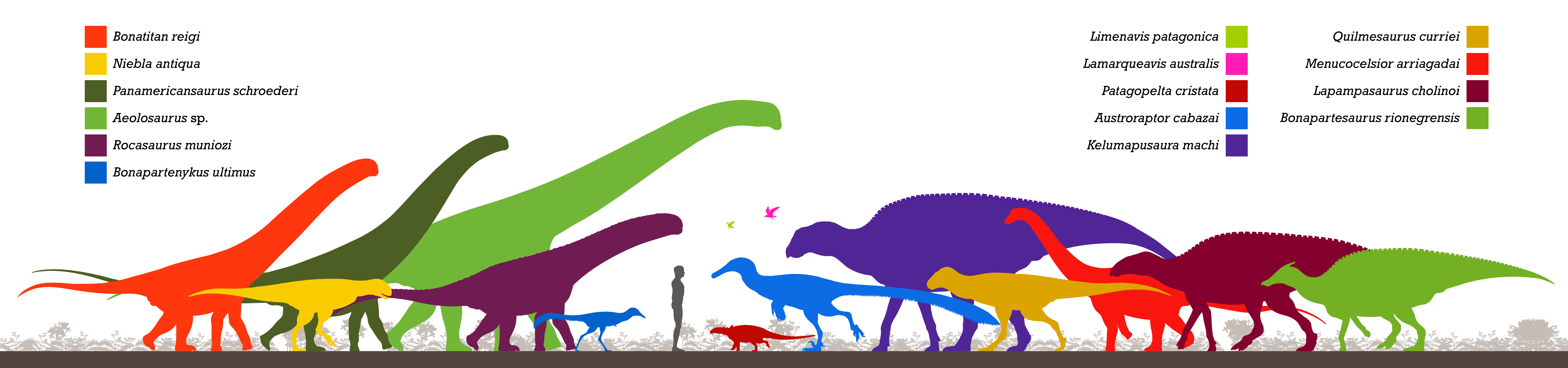
Dinosaur fauna of the Allen Formation (Kelumapusaura in purple, right)
