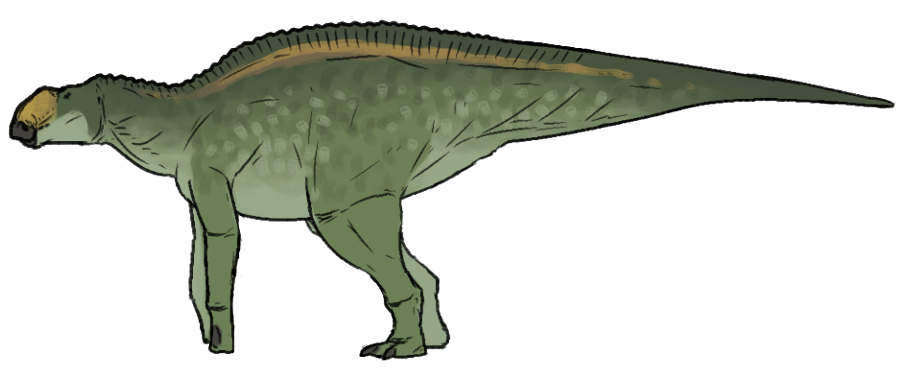
- Life restoration

Scientific classification
- Kingdom: Animalia
- Phylum: Chordata
- Class: Reptilia
- Clade: Dinosauria
- Clade: †Ornithischia
- Clade: †Ornithopoda
- Family: †Hadrosauridae
- Subfamily: †Saurolophinae
- Clade: †Austrokritosauria
- Genus: †Secernosaurus; Brett-Surman, 1979

Type species
- †Secernosaurus koerneri Brett-Surman, 1979

= Secernosaurus =

Secernosaurus Temporal range: Late Cretaceous, 68–66 Ma

Extinct genus of dinosaurs

Secernosaurus (meaning "severed lizard") is a genus of herbivorous hadrosaurid dinosaur that lived during the Late Cretaceous of what is now Argentina. This genus and its close relatives lived in South America, unlike most hadrosaurids, which lived in the Laurasian continents of Eurasia and North America. It has been suggested that the ancestors of Secernosaurus crossed into South America when a land bridge temporarily formed between North and South America during the Late Cretaceous and allowed biotic interchange between the two continents.

== History of research ==
The holotype of Secernosaurus koeneri was collected in 1923 as part of an expedition by the Field Museum led by J. B. Abbott. However, the specimen was not studied until the 1970s. In 1979, Brett-Surman named Secernosaurus. Though hadrosaurid specimens from South America had been described before, Secernosaurus koeneri was the first species of South American hadrosaurid to be formally named. The genus name Secernosaurus means "separated reptile" and comes from the Latin verb sēcernō, meaning to sever or divide, in reference to its geographic location separated from Laurasian hadrosaurs. The species name S. koerneri honors Harold E. Koerner. The holotype of Secernosaurus koerneri is FMNH P13423, a partial skeleton from the Lago Colhué Huapi Formation of Chubut province, Argentina.

In 2010, Albert Prieto-Marquez and Guillermo Salinas argued that Kritosaurus australis was synonymous with Secernosaurus koeneri. However, in 2015, Rodolfo Coria noted differences between the two, and suggested their taxonomy needed reevaluation. In 2022, the two species were recognized as separate and the genus Huallasaurus was established for Kritosaurus australis.

== Description ==
Secernosaurus may have been small for a hadrosaurid. The type specimen pertains to an individual approximately 4–5 metres (13–16 ft) long, which was initially suggested to be a subadult, but has been suggested that it may have been more mature than previously thought. The neuroanatomy of S. koerneri was very similar to that of hadrosaurids from the Northern Hemisphere.

== Classification ==
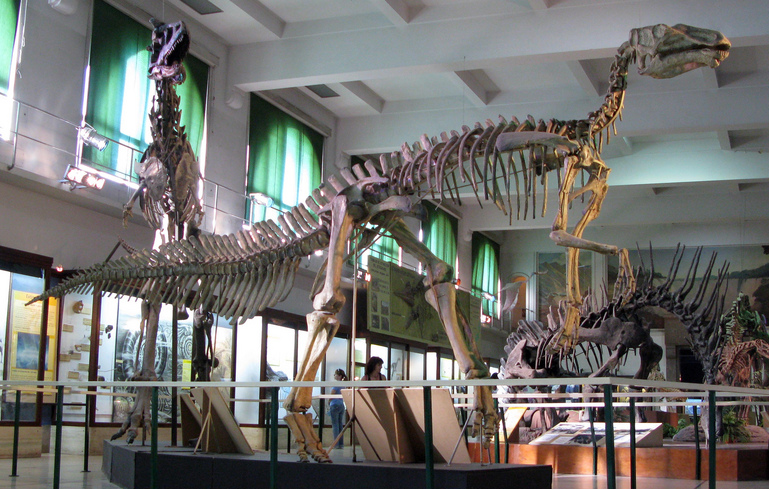
Huallasaurus, once considered a junior synonym of Secernosaurus, is still considered a close relative

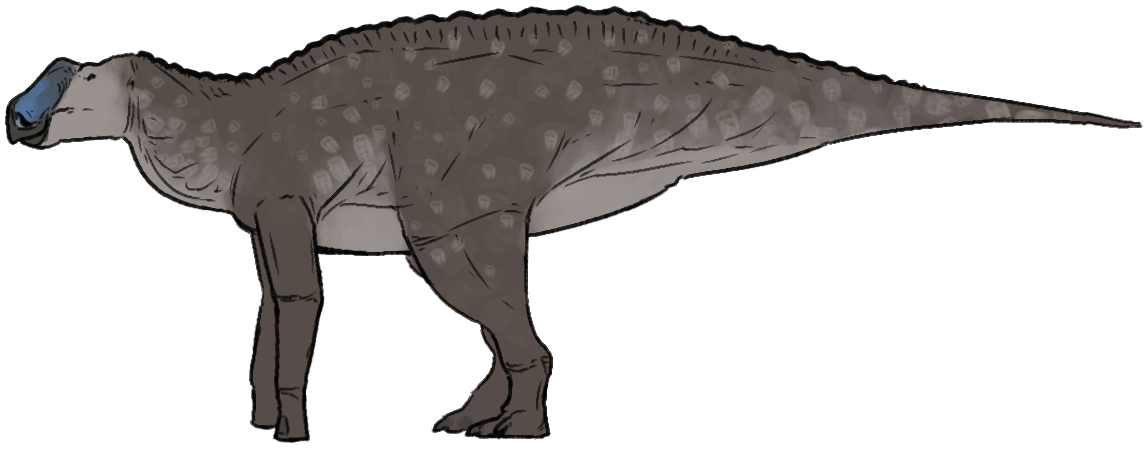
Secernosaurus was a close relative of North American kritosaurins such as Gryposaurus

Phylogenetic analyses have found Secernosaurus to be a member of the hadrosaurid tribe Kritosaurini within the subfamily Saurolophinae. North American animals such as Kritosaurus and Gryposaurus are also part of this clade. Rozadilla et al. (2022) recovered all South American saurolophines to group together within a single clade consisting of Secernosaurus, Huallasaurus, Kelumapusaura, and Bonapartesaurus. In the 2023 description of the South American hadrosauroid Gonkoken, Alarcón-Muñoz et al. named the Austrokritosauria, a clade closely related to kritosaurins, consisting of all the South American saurolophines. The results of their phylogenetic analyses of Saurolophinae are displayed in the cladogram below:

- Saurolophinae
  - - - Wulagasaurus
      - Acristavus
    - - Maiasaura
      - - Probrachylophosaurus
        - Brachylophosaurus
  - - - Austrokritosauria
        - Secernosaurus
        - - Bonapartesaurus
          - - Kelumapusaura
            - Huallasaurus
      - Kritosaurini
        - Kritosaurus
        - - - Rhinorex
            - Gryposaurus latidens
          - - Gryposaurus notabilis
            - Gryposaurus monumentensis
    - - Kamuysaurus
      - - - Prosaurolophus
          - - Saurolophus osborni
            - Saurolophus angustirostris
        - - - Laiyangosaurus
            - Kerberosaurus
          - - Shantungosaurus
            - - Edmontosaurus regalis
              - Edmontosaurus annectens

== Palaeoecology ==
=== Palaeoenvironment ===
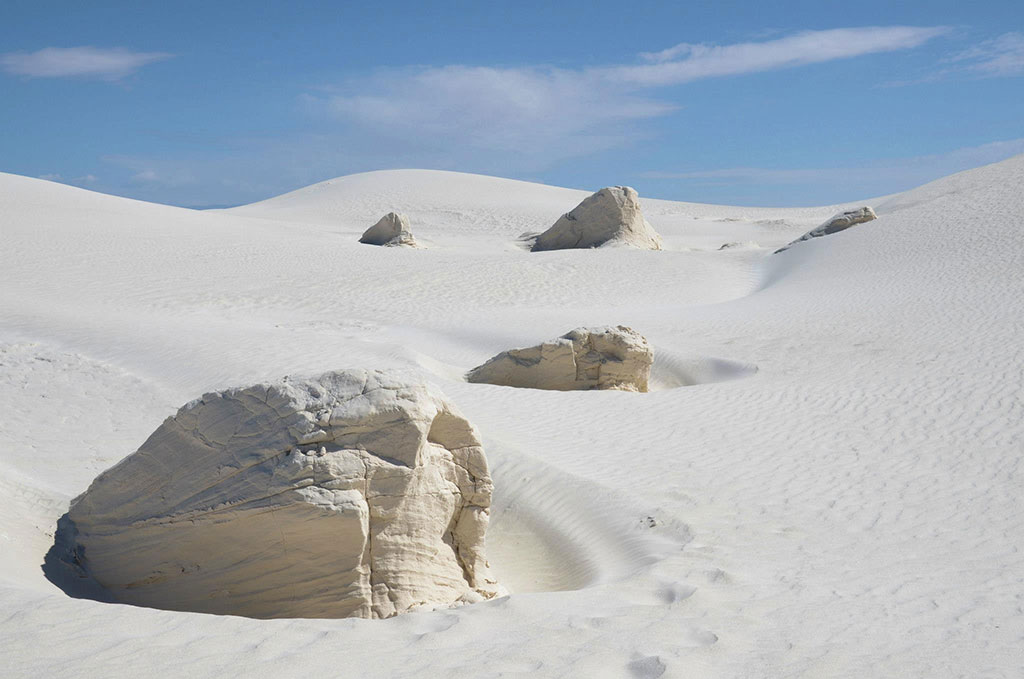
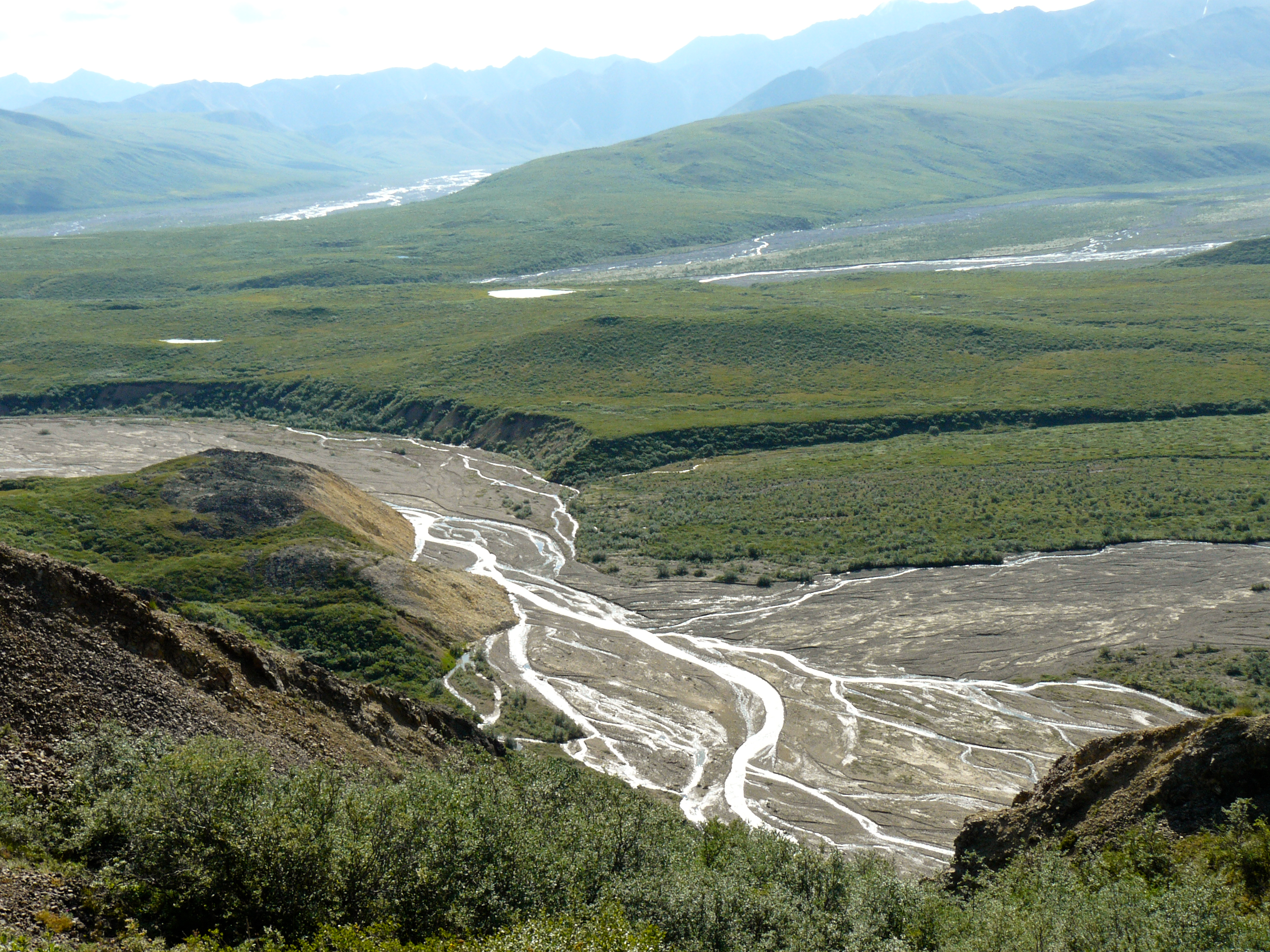
The environment Secernosaurus lived in fluctuated between arid, gypsum-rich conditions and seasonally wet conditions over a short span of geologic time

The geologic layers of the Lago Colhué Huapi Formation, where Scernosaurus hails from, have proved difficult to interpret historically, their assignment shifting around between several different geologic formations before finally being settled as its own unit of the Chubut Group, dating to the Maastrichtian. Additionally, Secernosaurus specifically had a very uncertain geologic provenance. As a result, the ecosystem Secernosaurus would have lived in was not well understood historically. A 2016 paper by Casal A. Gabriel and colleagues studied the climatic conditions of the region more in depth, finding evidence of climate change across geologic time. Fluvial systems and evidence of a floodplain environment were recognized, but the geologically lower parts of the formation also showed evidence of semi-arid conditions, large gypsum deposits, and desiccation cracks, indicating intense aridization of the region compared to the very humid climate of the Bajo Barreal Formation's ecosystem that preceded Lago Colhué Huapi Formation. However, palynological data indicate that during the upper deposits of the formation at the very end of the Cretaceous and into the Danian age of the Paleocene, the climate became milder once again and returned to a balanced wet and dry season. It is from this uppermost part of the formation that Secernosaurus is from. More recent discoveries of hadrosaur remains from other localities, which could belong to Secernosaurus might extend the range within the formation hadrosaurs are found in. Currently, however, they have not been researched in depth.

Secernosaurus is not the only dinosaur known from Lago Colhué Huapi. Remains of the sauropods Elaltitan lilloi, Argyrosaurus superbus and Aeolosaurus colhuehuapensis, as well as unidentified sauropod remains found in 2010, have been discovered in the formation. Very fragmentary remains of dromaeosaurid and megaraptoran theropods such as Joaquinraptor have also been discovered, as is expected from other formations from a similar time and place. The enigmatic ornithischian dinosaur Notoceratops, based on a lost fragmentary specimen originally considered to belong to a ceratopsian but now debated between that identity and that of a hadrosaur. Finally, scant fossils of chelonians, crocodyliformes, and dipnoid fish have also been found.

=== Palaeobiogeography ===
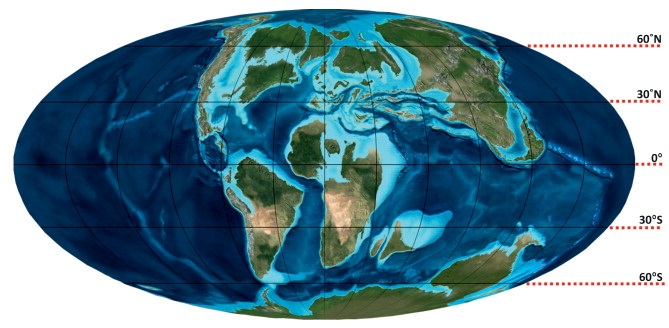
Map of the continents in the Late Cretaceous; the southern "Gondwanan" continents were diverging, with South America becoming isolated from other continents

Secernosaurus lived in what is now Patagonia during the Maastrichtian age of the Cretaceous period. It was one of the few hadrosaurs to live in South America. Their presence in South America is likely to represent a dispersal event from North America during the Campanian, when the proto-Antilles may have formed an island chain that allowed land vertebrates to cross between the two continents. The arrival of hadrosaurids in South America may have caused the decline of the native ornithopods, the elasmarians.

== See also ==
- Timeline of hadrosaur research
- Alamosaurus– a titanosaur whose ancestors may have crossed into North America at the same time the ancestors of Secernosaurus crossed into South America
- Huallasaurus
- Kritosaurus
