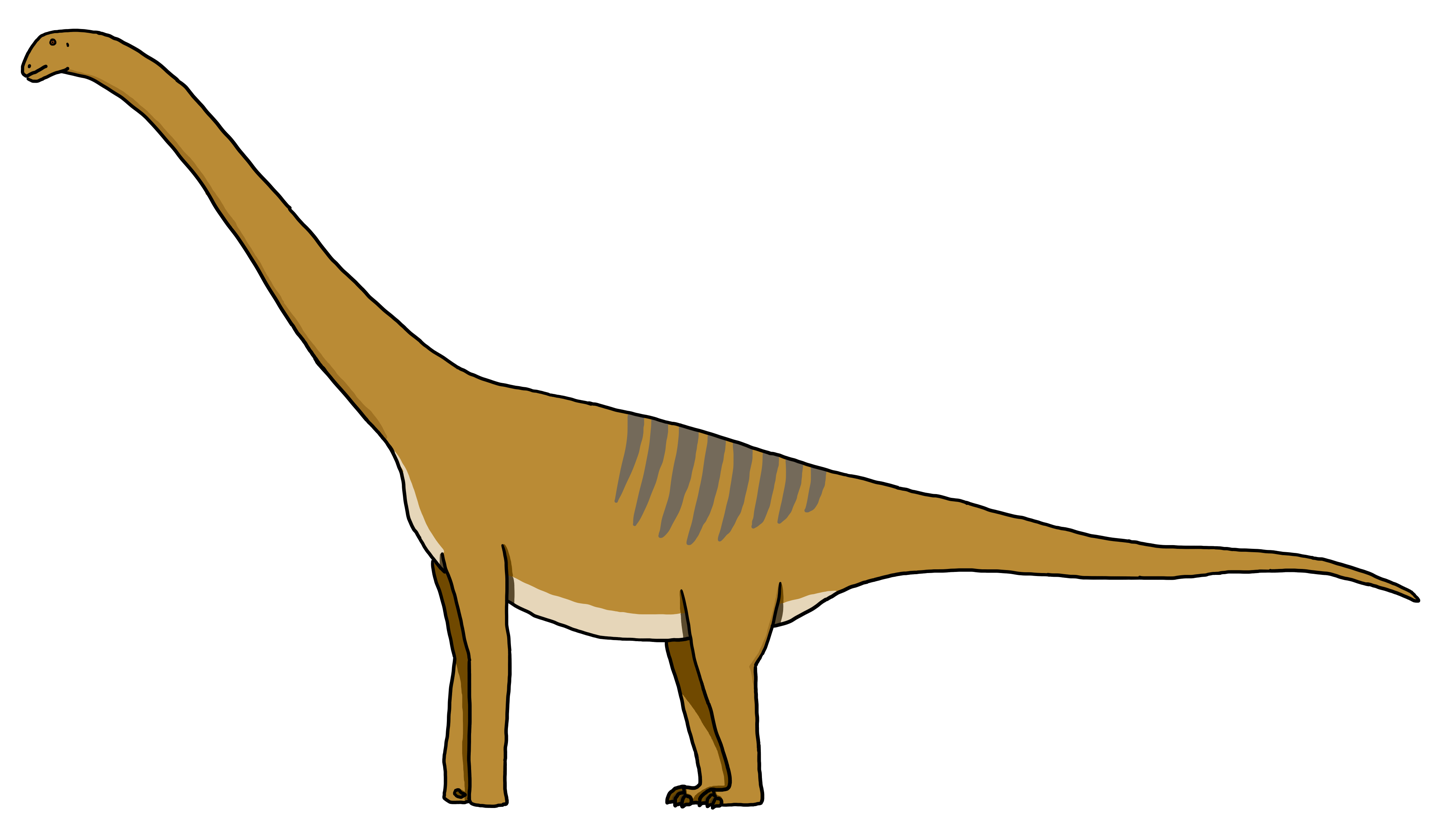
- Restoration as a somphospondylan

Scientific classification
- Kingdom: Animalia
- Phylum: Chordata
- Class: Reptilia
- Clade: Dinosauria
- Clade: Saurischia
- Clade: †Sauropodomorpha
- Clade: †Sauropoda
- Clade: †Macronaria
- Clade: †Titanosauriformes
- Clade: †Somphospondyli
- Genus: †Arkharavia; Alifanov & Bolotsky, 2010

Type species
- Arkharavia heterocoelica Alifanov & Bolotsky, 2010

= Arkharavia =

Arkharavia Temporal range: Late Cretaceous, 66 Ma

Extinct genus of reptiles

Arkharavia (meaning "Arkhara road") is a dubious genus of somphospondylan sauropod, although at least some of its remains probably belong to a hadrosaurid. It was discovered in the Udurchukan Formation in Russia and lived during the Late Cretaceous. It was described in 2010 by Alifanov and Bolotsky as the type species A. heterocoelica.

== Description ==
The holotype material consists of a single anterior caudal vertebra. Also, a tooth and a few proximal tail vertebrae (from near the base of the tail) were originally described as belonging to this species, but these probably belong to an indeterminate hadrosaur. The vertebrae are unusual in being weakly heterocoelous, which means that the centrum or body of a vertebra has saddle-shaped surfaces where it meets the vertebrae in front or behind it.

== Classification ==
Arkharavia was originally classified as a titanosauriform sauropod, thought to be related to Chubutisaurus, a sauropod from the Cretaceous of Argentina. However, further study showed that the referred vertebra in fact belonged to a hadrosaurid. The holotype vertebra is currently considered an indeterminate somphospondylan.

== Contemporaries ==
Arkharavia lived in the Amur Region, which was a 'hot spot' for dinosaurs in Russia. Other dinosaurs from the area include the lambeosaurines (hollow-crested duckbills) Amurosaurus, Olorotitan, and Charonosaurus, and the saurolophine (duckbills without hollow crests) Kerberosaurus and Wulagasaurus.

== See also ==
- 2010 in paleontology
