= Udurchukan Formation =

Geologic formation in Russia

- Stratigraphic range: Maastrichtian; ~70–66 Ma
- Type: Geological formation
- Unit of: Tsagayan Group
- Underlies: Bureya Formation
- Overlies: Kundur Formation
- Thickness: 11 metres (40 ft) exposed at Kundur locality

Lithology
- Primary: Conglomerate, mudstone, diamictite
- Other: Sandstone

Location
- Coordinates: 49.5°N 129.5°E
- Approximate paleocoordinates: 51.4°N 115.8°E
- Region: Amur Oblast
- Country: Russia
- Extent: Zeya-Bureya Basin
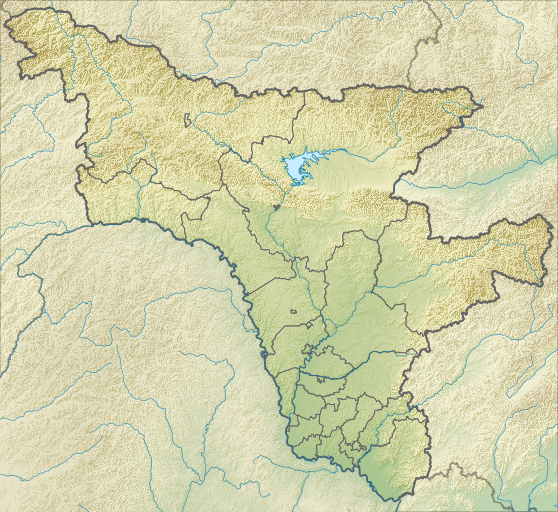
- Udurchukan Formation (Russia) Udurchukan Formation (Amur Oblast)

The Udurchukan Formation is a geological formation located in Amur Region, Far East Russia. Based on palynomorphs such as Wodehouseia spinata, the Udurchukan is considered of Maastrichtian age of the Late Cretaceous.

== Fossil content ==
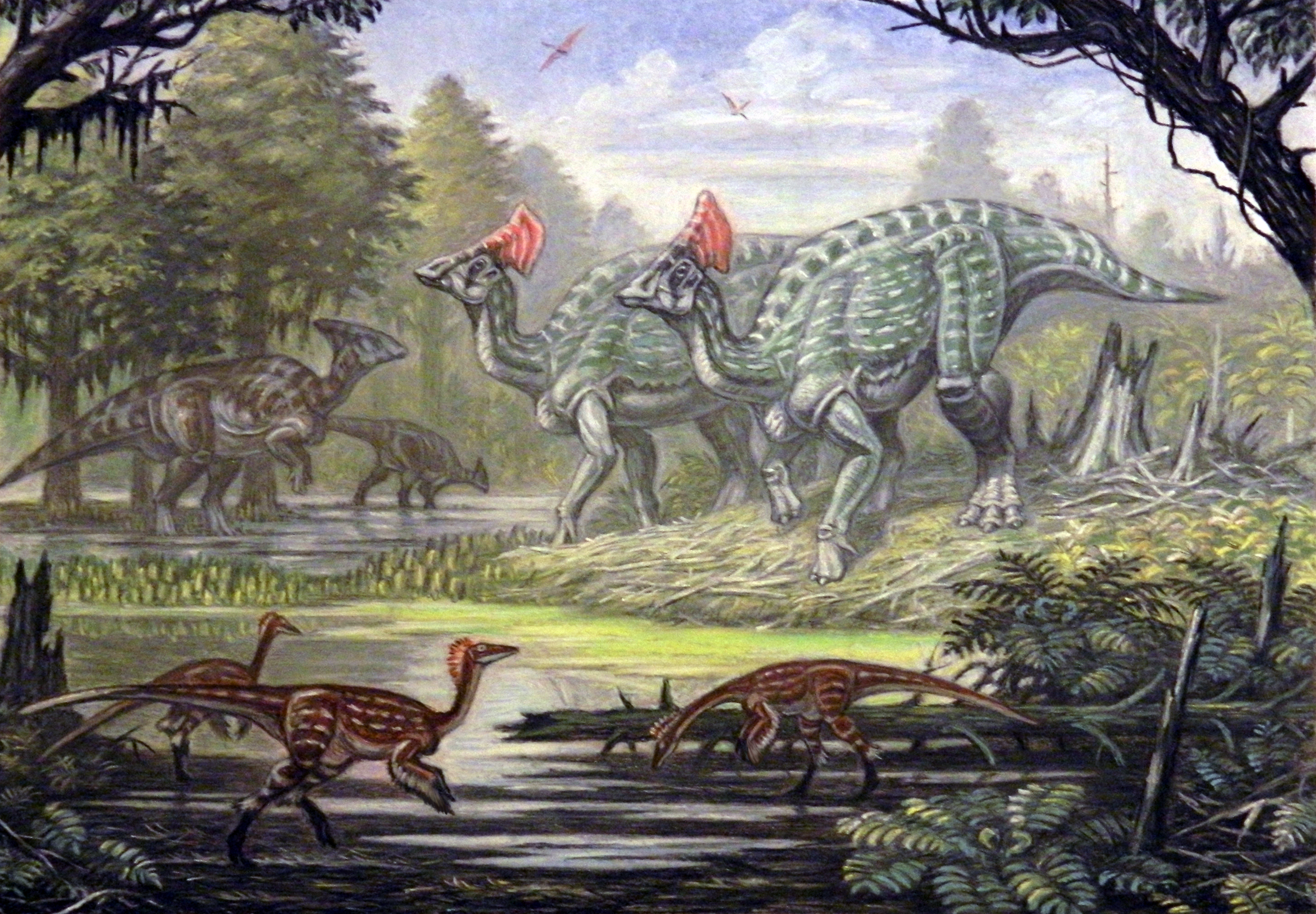
Dinosaurs of Udurchukan Formation

Since Wodehouseia spinata and Aquillapollenites subtilis are known in the Americas only from the Late Maastrichtian, the presence of these palynomorphs in the Udurchukan caused Godefroit to consider the unit and its lambeosaurine dominated fauna to be coeval with the Lance Formation and Hell Creek Formation. However, research in the Songliao Basin indicates Wodehouseia spinata is also known from the early (albeit not basal) and middle Maastrichtian of Asia.

Color key: Taxon / Reclassified taxon / Taxon falsely reported as present / Dubious taxon or junior synonym / Ichnotaxon / Ootaxon / Morphotaxon

Notes
Uncertain or tentative taxa are in small text
~~crossed out~~ taxa are discredited.

=== Dinosaurs ===
==== Ornithischians ====
===== Ankylosaurs =====
Anylosaurs reported from the Udurchukan Formation
Taxon	Species	Location	Stratigraphic position	Material	Notes	Images
Nodosauridae	indet.	Kundur	Upper	A tooth, an incomplete tooth and an osteo dermal scute.	A nodosaurid ankylosaur	

===== Hadrosaurs =====
Hadrosaurs reported from the Udurchukan Formation
Taxon	Species	Location	Stratigraphic position	Material	Notes	Images
Amurosaurus	A. riabinini	Blagoveschensk		A partial remnants of skull and lower jaw.	A lambeosaurin lambeosaurine which was the most common dinosaur in the area, a bonebed containing many specimens was unearthed in 2008.	
Kerberosaurus	K. manakini	Blagoveschensk		The caudal part of cranium consists of a braincase.	A edmontosaurin saurolophine	
Kundurosaurus	K. nagornyi	Kundur		A partial, disarticulated skull.	A edmontosaurin saurolophine; possibly synonymous with Kerberosaurus manakini.	
Hadrosaurinae indet.	Indetermidate					
Olorotitan	O. arharensis	Kundur		A nearly complete skeleton.	A lambeosaurin lambeosaurine	

==== Sauropods ====
Sauropods reported from the Udurchukan Formation
Taxon	Species	Location	Stratigraphic position	Material	Notes	Images
Arkharavia	A. heterocoelica	Kundur	Upper	A single tooth and a proximal tail vertebrae, although some remains probably belong to a hadrosaurid.	A somphospondylan sauropod	
Opisthocoelicaudiinae indet.	Indetermidate					
Titanosauria indet.	Indetermidate					

==== Theropods ====
Theropods reported from the Udurchukan Formation
Taxon	Species	Location	Stratigraphic position	Material	Notes	Images
Albertosaurinae indet.	Indetermidate					
Dromaeosaurinae indet.	Indetermidate					
Dromaeosaurinae indet.	Indeterminate					
Ornithomimidae indet.	Indetermidate				Described as being very similar to Qiupalong	
Richardoestesia	R. sp					
Saurornitholestes	S. cf. sp.					
Theropoda indet.	Indeterminate					
Troodon	T. sp.					
Tyrannosaurinae indet.	Indetermidate				Similar in size to Tyrannosaurus	

=== Reptiles ===
Reptiles reported from the Udurchukan Formation
Taxon	Species	Location	Stratigraphic position	Material	Notes	Images
Amuremys	A. planicostata				A lindholmemydid turtle	
Crocodylia indet.	Indeterminate					
Lindholmemydidae indet.	Indeterminate					
Shamosuchus	S. sp.					
Testudines indet.	Indeterminate					
Trionychidae indet.	Indeterminate					

=== Mammals ===
Mammals reported from the Udurchukan Formaton
Taxon	Species	Location	Stratigraphic Position	Material	Notes	Images
Cimolodonta indet.	Indeterminate					
Stygimys	S. kuszmauli				A eucosmodontid djadochtatherioid	

=== Insects ===
Insects reported from the Udurchukan Formation
Taxon	Species	Location	Stratigraphic position	Material	Notes	Images
Mesosigara	M. kryshtofovichi					

=== Flora ===
Plants reported from the Udurchukan Formation
Taxon	Species	Location	Stratigraphic position	Material	Notes	Images
Cupressinoxylon	C. sp.					

== See also ==
- Geology of Russia
- Fossils of Russia
