= Yuliangze Formation =

Geological formation in Heilongjiang, China

- Stratigraphic range: Early - Late Maastrichtian; ~72–66 Ma
- Type: Geological formation
- Underlies: Taipinglinchang Formation

Location
- Coordinates: 48.9°N 130.2°E
- Approximate paleocoordinates: 48.0°N 117.9°E
- Region: Heilongjiang
- Country: China
- Extent: Sunwu–Jiayin Basin
- Yuliangze Formation (China) Yuliangze Formation (Henan)

The Yuliangze Formation, or Yuliangzi Formation, is a geological formation in Heilongjiang, China, whose strata date back to the early-late Maastrichtian. Dinosaur remains are among the fossils that have been recovered from the formation.

== Fossil content ==
=== Dinosaurs ===
| Color key: Taxon / Reclassified taxon / Taxon falsely reported as present / Dubious taxon or junior synonym / Ichnotaxon / Ootaxon / Morphotaxon | Notes; Uncertain or tentative taxa are in small text; ~~crossed out~~ taxa are discredited. |

==== Ornithischians ====
===== Hadrosaurs =====
Hadrosaurs reported from the Yuliangze Formation
| Taxon | Species | Location | Stratigraphic position | Material | Notes | Images |
|---|---|---|---|---|---|---|
| Charonosaurus | C. jiayinensis | Jiayin | Upper | "Partial skull and partial, fragmentary postcranial elements". | A parasaurolophin lambeosaurine | |
| Mandschurosaurus | M. amurensis | Jiayin | Upper | A poorly preserved and incomplete skeleton. | A hadrosaurid hadrosaur of uncertain affinities. | |
| Sahaliyania | S. elunchunorum | Wuluga | Upper | A partial skull along with the pectoral girdle, an upper arm, and a pelvis. | A lambeosaurin lambeosaurine; junior synonymous with Amurosaurus riabinini. | |
| Saurolophus | S. kryschtofovici | Jiayin | | A holotype specimen. | Dubious or synonymous with S. angustirostris. | |
| Wulagasaurus | W. dongi | Wulaga | Upper | A right partial dentary. | A brachylophosaurin saurolophine | |

==== Theropods ====
Theropods reported from the Yuliangze Formation
| Taxon | Species | Location | Stratigraphic position | Material | Notes | Images |
|---|---|---|---|---|---|---|
| Tyrannosauridae indet. | Indeterminate | | | | | |
| Ornithomimosauria indet. | Indeterminate | | | | | |
| Troodontidae Indet. | Indeterminate | | | | | |

== See also ==
- List of dinosaur-bearing rock formations
