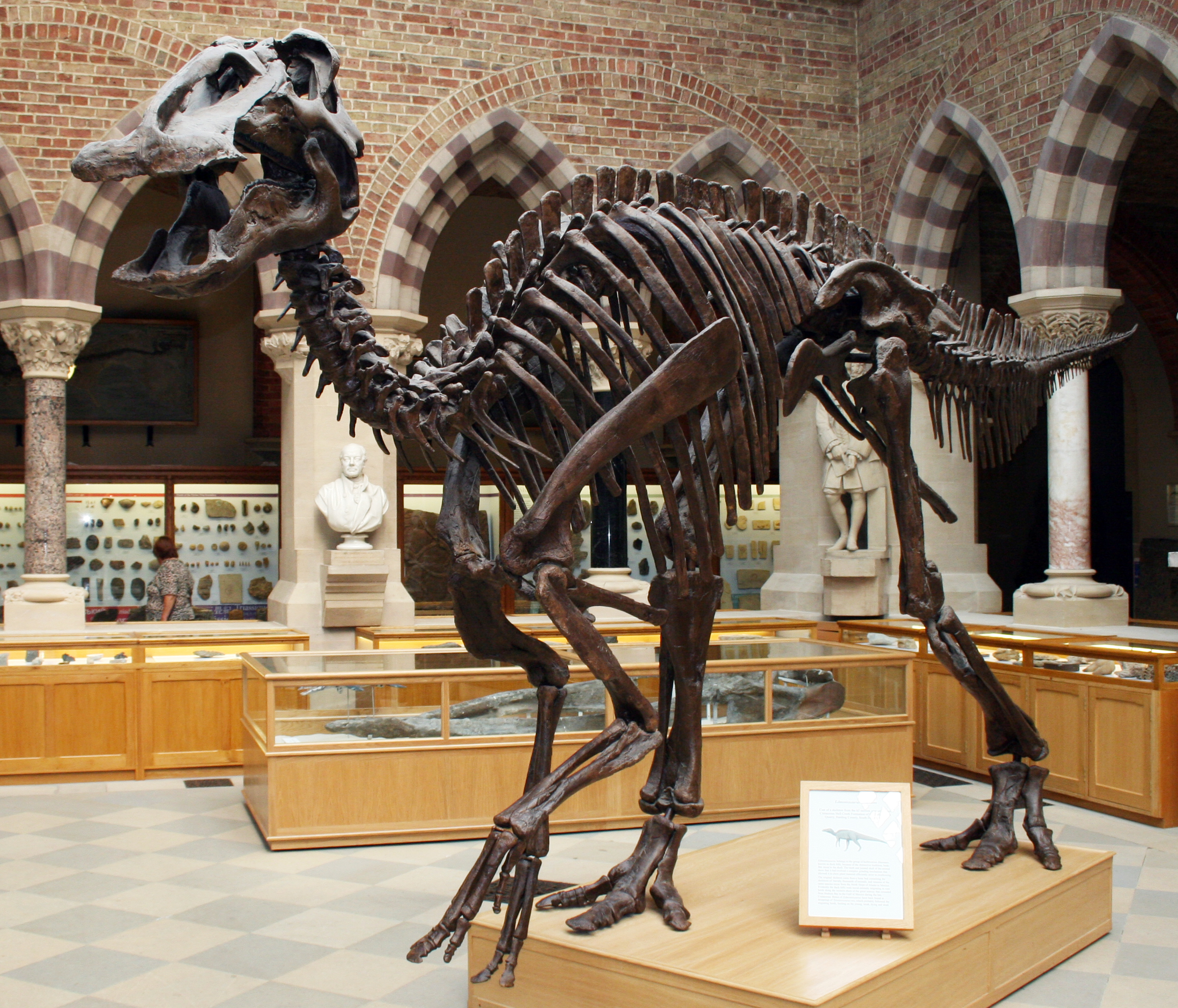
- Fossil mount of Edmontosaurus

Scientific classification
- Kingdom: Animalia
- Phylum: Chordata
- Class: Reptilia
- Clade: Dinosauria
- Clade: †Ornithischia
- Clade: †Ornithopoda
- Family: †Hadrosauridae
- Clade: †Euhadrosauria
- Subfamily: †Saurolophinae; Lambe, 1918

Type species
- †Saurolophus osborni Brown, 1912

Tribes and genera
- †Barsboldia; †Austrokritosauria Alarcón-Muñoz et al., 2023; †Bonapartesaurus; †Huallasaurus; †Kelumapusaura; †Secernosaurus; †Brachylophosaurini Gates et al., 2011; †Acristavus; †Brachylophosaurus; †Gongshuilong; †Maiasaura; †Ornatops; †Probrachylophosaurus; †Wulagasaurus; †Edmontosaurini Lambe, 1917; †Edmontosaurus; †Kamuysaurus; †Kerberosaurus; †Kundurosaurus; †Laiyangosaurus; †Shantungosaurus; †Kritosaurini Brown, 1910; †Ahshislesaurus; †Anasazisaurus; †Coahuilasaurus; †Gryposaurus; †Kritosaurus; †Naashoibitosaurus; †Rhinorex; †Saurolophini Godefroit et al., 2012; †Augustynolophus; †Prosaurolophus; †Saurolophus

= Saurolophinae =

Saurolophinae Temporal range: Late Cretaceous, 83–66 Ma

Extinct subfamily of dinosaurs

Saurolophinae is a subfamily of hadrosaurid dinosaurs. It has since the mid-20th century generally been called the Hadrosaurinae, a group of largely non-crested hadrosaurs related to the crested sub-family Lambeosaurinae. However, the name Hadrosaurinae is based on the genus Hadrosaurus which was found in more recent studies to be more primitive than either lambeosaurines or other traditional "hadrosaurines", like Edmontosaurus and Saurolophus. As a result of this, the name Hadrosaurinae was dropped or restricted to Hadrosaurus alone, and the subfamily comprising the traditional "hadrosaurines" was renamed the Saurolophinae. Recent phylogenetic work by Hai Xing indicates that Hadrosaurus is placed within the monophyletic group containing all non-lambeosaurine hadrosaurids. Under this view, the traditional Hadrosaurinae is resurrected, with the Hadrosauridae being divided into two clades: Hadrosaurinae and Lambeosaurinae.

== Classification ==
Saurolophinae was first defined as a clade in a 2010 phylogenetic analysis by Prieto-Márquez. Traditionally, the "crestless" branch of the family Hadrosauridae had been named Hadrosaurinae. However, the use of the term Hadrosaurinae was questioned in a comprehensive study of hadrosaurid relationships by Albert Prieto-Márquez in 2010. Prieto-Márquez noted that, though the name Hadrosaurinae had been used for the clade of mostly crestless hadrosaurids by nearly all previous studies, its type species, Hadrosaurus foulkii, has almost always been excluded from the clade that bears its name, in violation of the rules for naming animals set out by the ICZN. Prieto-Márquez (2010) defined Hadrosaurinae as only the lineage containing H. foulkii, and used the name Saurolophinae instead for the traditional grouping.

In a 2023 study, Alarcón-Muñoz et al. implemented an updated version of the phylogenetic matrix of Rozadilla et al. (2022) to analyze the relationships of saurolophines and hadrosaurids. The results of their phylogenetic analyses of Saurolophinae are displayed in the cladogram below.

- Saurolophinae
  - Brachylophosaurini
    - - Wulagasaurus
      - Acristavus
    - - Maiasaura
      - - Probrachylophosaurus
        - Brachylophosaurus
  - - - Austrokritosauria
        - Secernosaurus
        - - Bonapartesaurus
          - - Kelumapusaura
            - Huallasaurus
      - Kritosaurini
        - Kritosaurus
        - - - Rhinorex
            - Gryposaurus latidens
          - - Gryposaurus notabilis
            - Gryposaurus monumentensis
    - - Kamuysaurus
      - - Saurolophini
          - Prosaurolophus
          - - Saurolophus osborni
            - Saurolophus angustirostris
        - Edmontosaurini
          - - Laiyangosaurus
            - Kerberosaurus
          - - Shantungosaurus
            - - Edmontosaurus regalis
              - Edmontosaurus annectens

=== Subgroups ===
The clade Brachylophosaurini was defined by Terry Gates and colleagues in 2011 as "Hadrosaurine ornithopods more closely related to Brachylophosaurus, Maiasaura, or Acristavus than to Gryposaurus or Saurolophus". In 2021, Madzia et al. registered Brachylophosaurini in the PhyloCode and formally defined it as "The largest clade containing Brachylophosaurus canadensis but not Edmontosaurus regalis, Hadrosaurus foulkii, Kritosaurus navajovius and Saurolophus osborni".

The name "Kritosaurini" was first mentioned in 1955 by Lapparent & Lavocat, where they mentioned "'Kritosaurinés" as a group of hadrosaurids containing only Kritosaurus, which was thought of as a senior synonym of Gryposaurus at the time. In 1989, Michael Brett-Surman proposed the name Kritosaurini as a tribe of hadrosaurines that contained Aralosaurus, Brachylophosaurus, Hadrosaurus, and Kritosaurus (including Gryposaurus). It was not until 2014 that Albert Prieto-Márquez officially defined and diagnosed Kritosaurini as the most exclusive clade of hadrosaurids containing Kritosaurus navajovius, Gryposaurus notabilis, and Naashoibitosaurus ostromi. Madia et al. (2021) defined the term under PhyloCode as "the largest clade containing Kritosaurus navajovius but not Brachylophosaurus canadensis, Edmontosaurus regalis, Hadrosaurus foulkii, Saurolophus osborni. In 2022, Rozadilla et al. described Huallasaurus and Kelumapusaura, two new genera similar to kritosaurins. In their study, they analyzed the relationships of the Kritosaurini and Hadrosauridae as a whole. In a study the following year, Alarcón-Muñoz et al. implemented an updated version of the phylogenetic matrix of Rozadilla et al., proposing the name Austrokritosauria for the clade of entirely South American saurolophines closely related to kritosaurins. This clade was defined as "the most inclusive clade containing Huallasaurus but not Gryposaurus".

== Palaeobiogeography ==
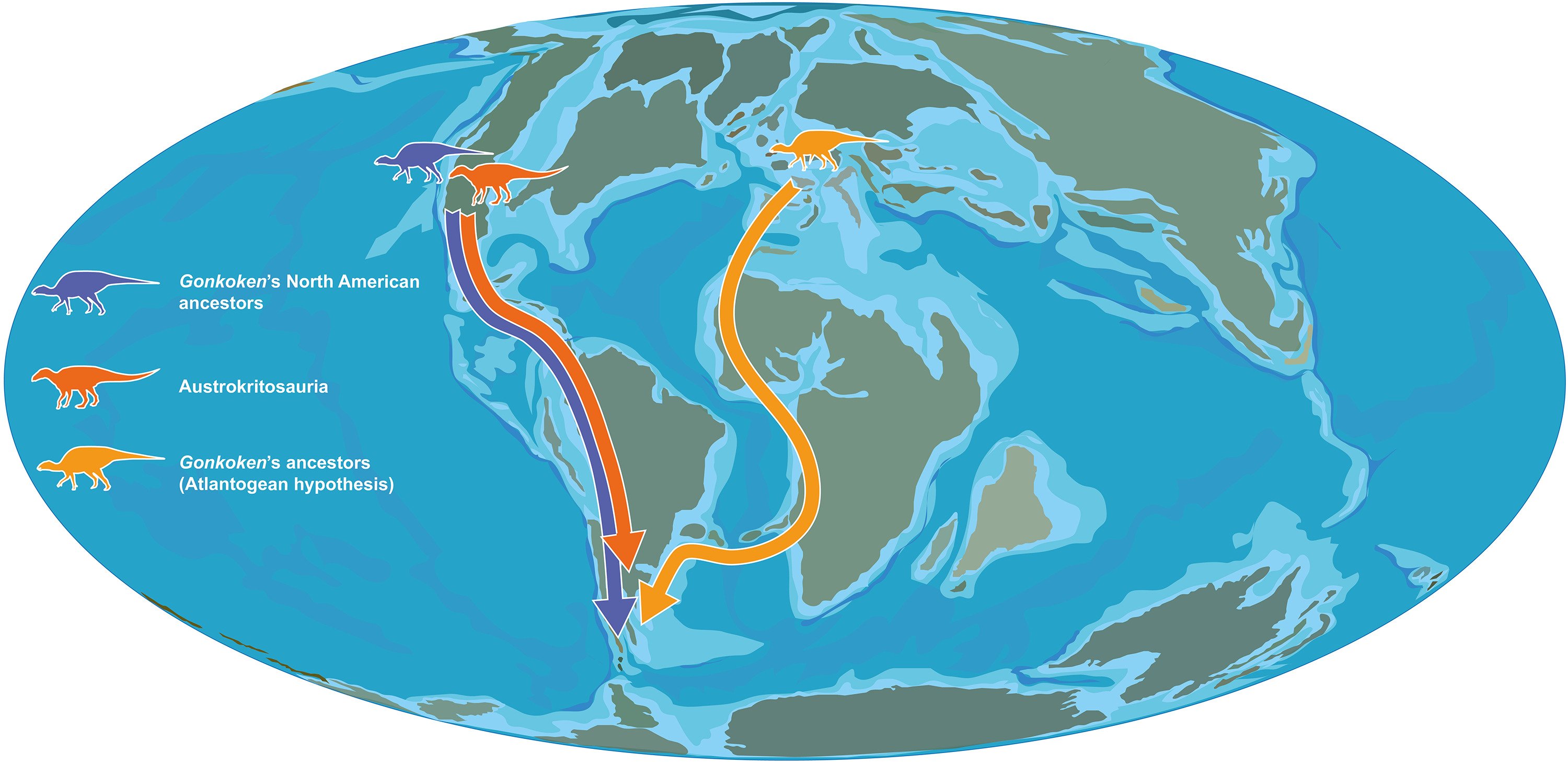
Likely dispersal route of the Austrokritosauria from North America to South America (red arrow)

Alarcón-Muñoz et al. (2023) suggested that austrokritosaurs shared an ancestor with the North American kritosaurins in the Santonian, about 85 million years ago, before dispersing into South America. This likely occurred via island chains and rafting. The South American hadrosauroid Gonkoken appears to have diverged from North American hadrosauroids at an even earlier time, about 91 million years ago in the Turonian. The North American titanosaur Alamosaurus may have experienced a similar dispersal events from relatives in South America in the late Campanian–early Maastrichtian.

== See also ==
- Timeline of hadrosaur research
