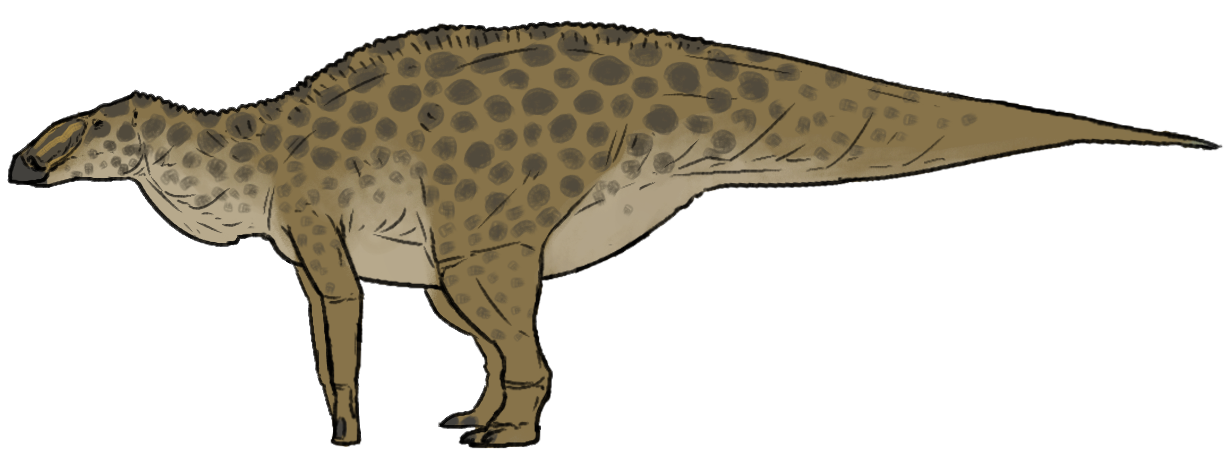
- Life restoration

Scientific classification
- Kingdom: Animalia
- Phylum: Chordata
- Class: Reptilia
- Clade: Dinosauria
- Clade: †Ornithischia
- Clade: †Ornithopoda
- Family: †Hadrosauridae
- Subfamily: †Saurolophinae
- Tribe: †Edmontosaurini
- Genus: †Laiyangosaurus; Zhang et al., 2019

Type species
- †Laiyangosaurus youngi Zhang et al., 2019

= Laiyangosaurus =

Laiyangosaurus Temporal range: Late Cretaceous, 72 Ma

Extinct genus of reptiles

Laiyangosaurus ("Laiyang lizard") is a genus of saurolophine hadrosaurid from the Late Cretaceous Jingangkou Formation of China. It is known from one species, L. youngi, found in the Laiyang Basin within the province of Shandong.

== Classification ==
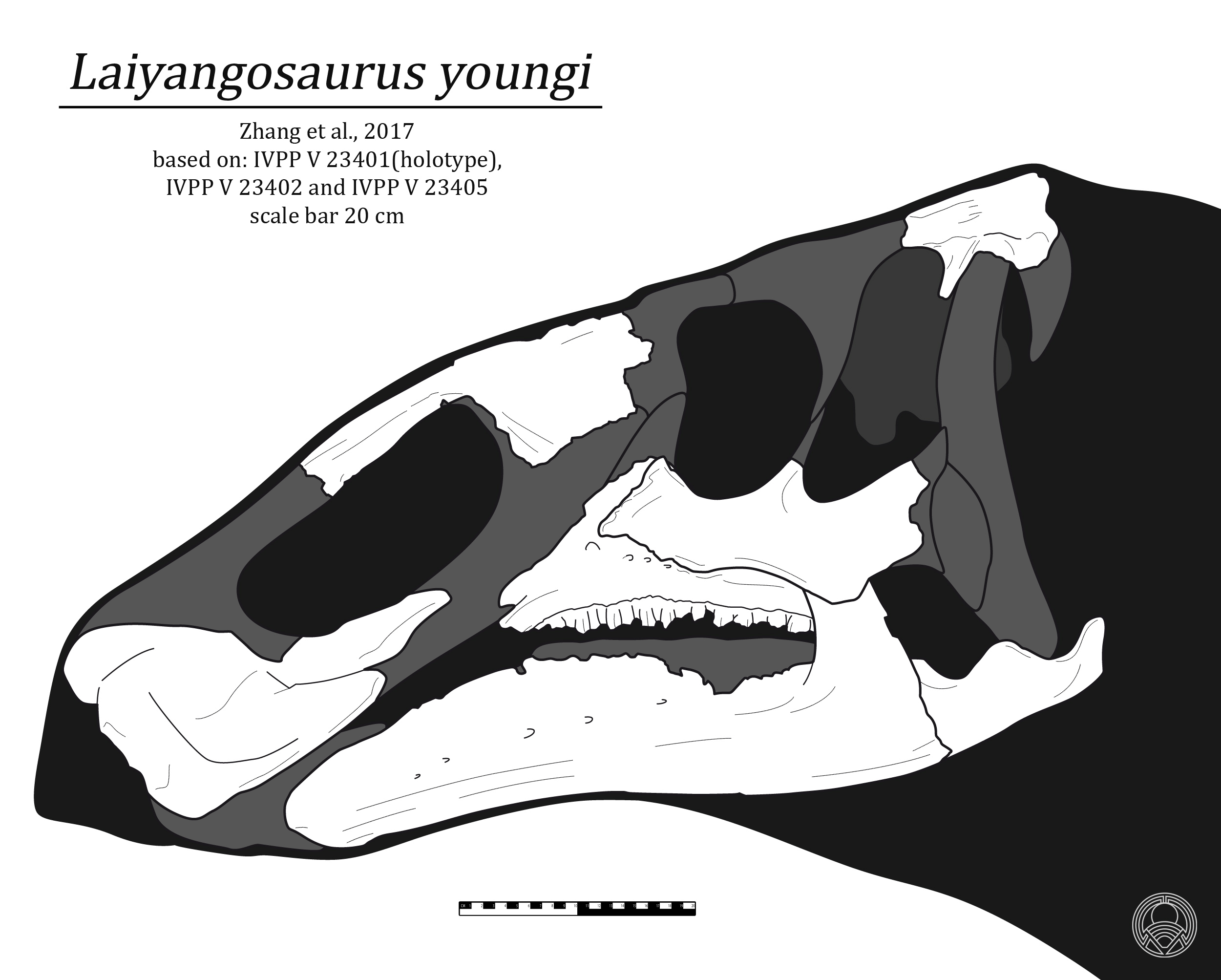
Diagram of skull material

Laiyangosaurus is a member of the saurolophine tribe Edmontosaurini. A number of specimens referred to Laiyangosaurus (IVPP V23405.1, V23403.1, V23402.1, V23404, V23402.7) apparently belong to kritosaurin and lambeosaurine hadrosaurids.

== Paleoenvironment ==
The Wangshi Series of Shandong Province has yielded a considerable amount of fossil material, including the remains of insects, plants and other vertebrates, including dinosaurs and dinosaur eggs.

== See also ==
- Timeline of hadrosaur research
