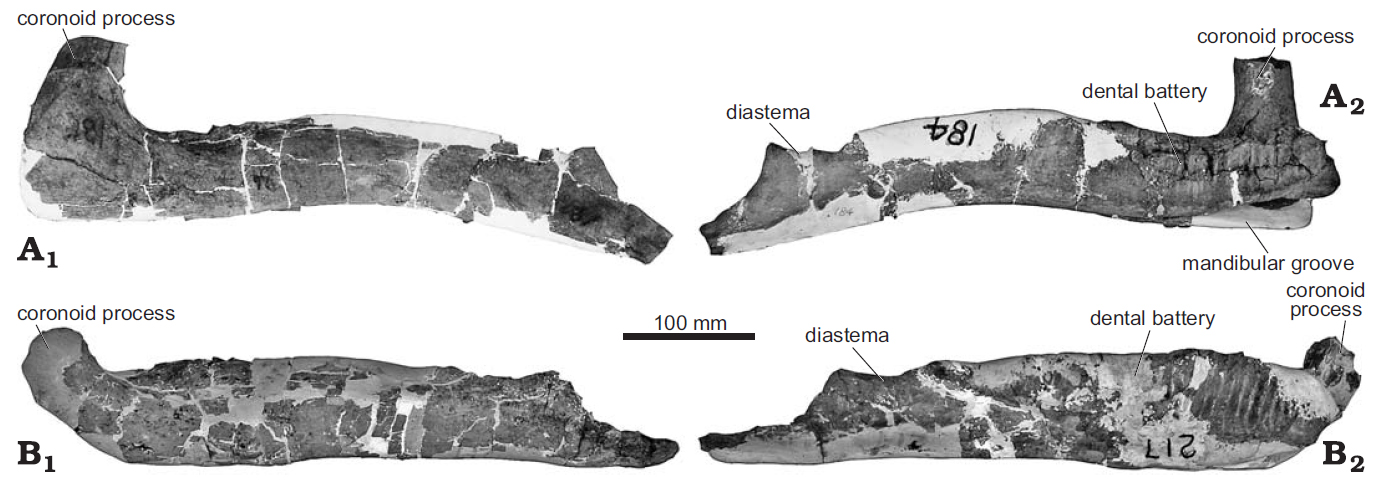
- Right dentary

Scientific classification
- Kingdom: Animalia
- Phylum: Chordata
- Class: Reptilia
- Clade: Dinosauria
- Clade: †Ornithischia
- Clade: †Ornithopoda
- Family: †Hadrosauridae
- Subfamily: †Saurolophinae
- Tribe: †Brachylophosaurini
- Genus: †Wulagasaurus; Godefroit et al., 2008
- Species: †W. dongi

Binomial name
- †Wulagasaurus dongi Godefroit et al., 2008

= Wulagasaurus =

Wulagasaurus Temporal range: Late Cretaceous, 69–66 Ma

Extinct genus of dinosaur

Wulagasaurus (meaning "Wulaga lizard", in reference to the discovery locality) is a genus of saurolophine hadrosaurid dinosaur known from the Late Cretaceous of Heilongjiang, China.

== Discovery ==
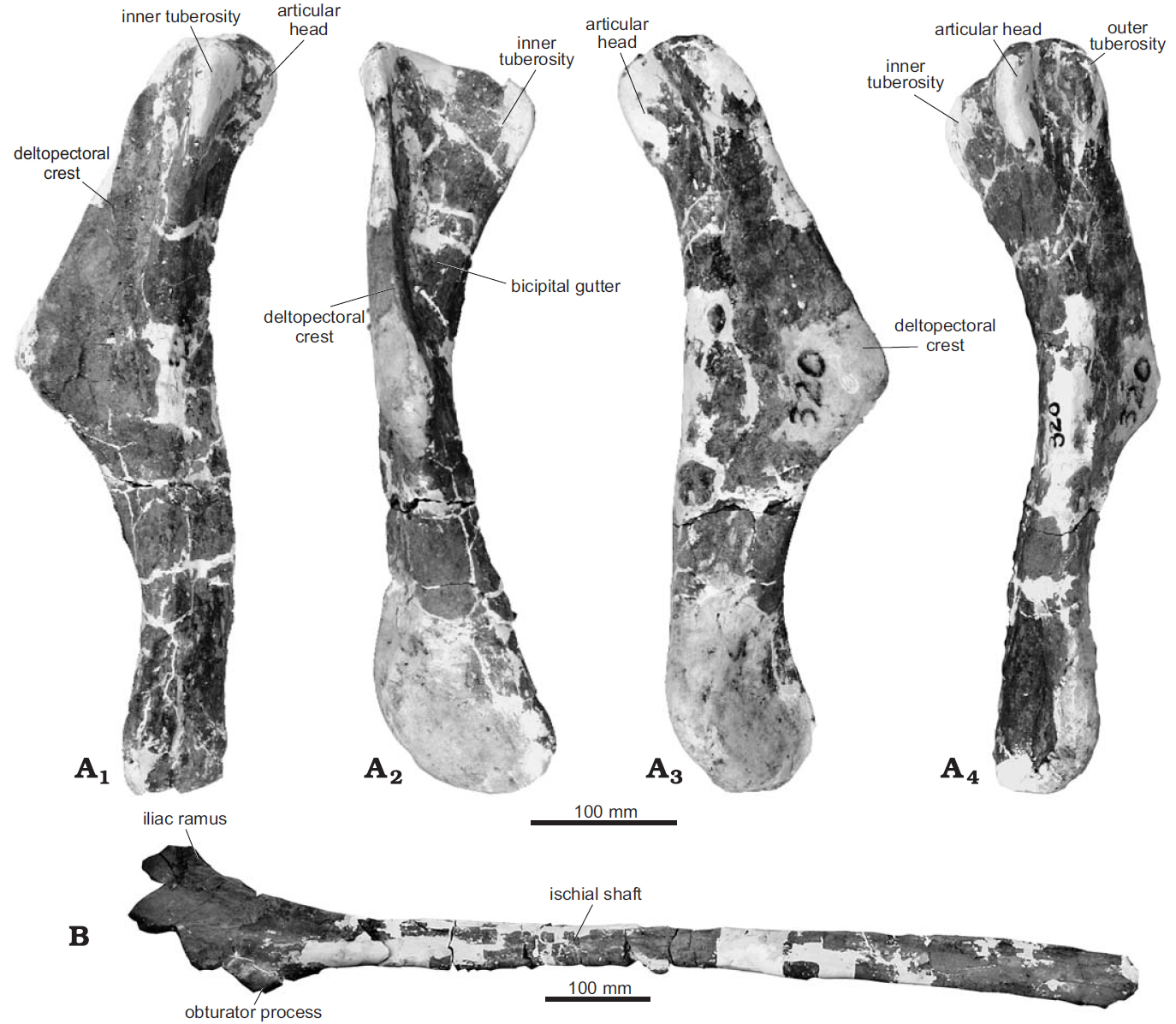
Humerus and ischium

Its remains were found in a bonebed in the middle Maastrichtian-age Yuliangze Formation, dated to 69 million years ago. This bonebed is otherwise dominated by fossils of the lambeosaurine hadrosaurid (hollow-crested duckbill) Sahaliyania. Wulagasaurus was named by Pascal Godefroit and colleagues in 2008. Only partial remains are known at this time. It is one of several hadrosaurids from the Amur River region named since 2000. The type and only species to date is W. dongi, named in honor of Chinese paleontologist Dong Zhiming.

Wulagasaurus is based on GMH W184, a partial dentary (toothbearing bone of the lower jaw). Godefroit and colleagues assigned additional remains from the bonebed to their new genus, including three braincases, a cheekbone, two maxillae (the toothbearing bone of the upper jaw), another dentary, two shoulder blades, two sternal elements, two upper arm bones, and an ischium. It can be distinguished from other hadrosaurids by its slender dentary and the unique form of its upper arm, which had distinctive articulations and placements for muscle attachments. Godefroit and colleagues performed a phylogenetic analysis that suggests Wulagasaurus was the most basal saurolophine known (which would result in a long ghost lineage), and interpreted this as evidence that saurolophines and hadrosaurids in general originated in Asia, which has been supported by other finds since.

== Description ==
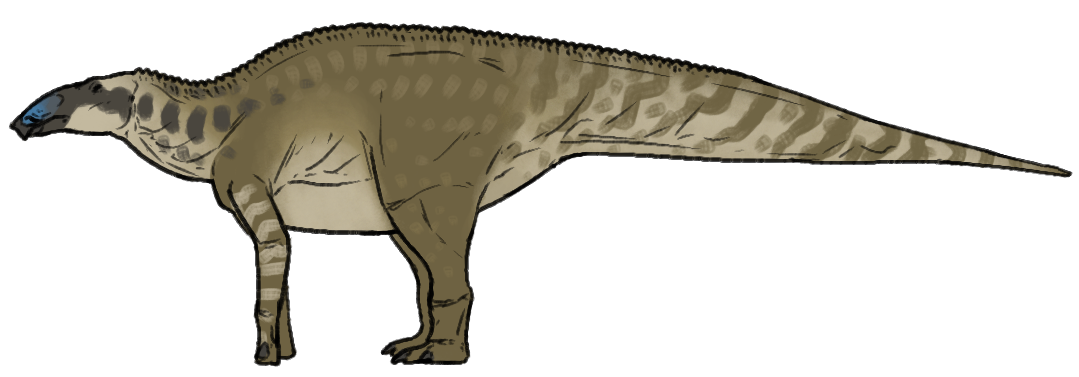
Life restoration

In 2010 Gregory S. Paul estimated its size at 9 meters (30 ft) and 3 tonnes (3.3 short tons). As a hadrosaurid, Wulagasaurus would have been an herbivore.

== Classification ==
In a 2012 conducted by researchers from the Institute of Vertebrate Paleontology and Paleoanthropology (IVPP), along with others from Chinese Academy of Sciences, American Museum of Natural History, and Geological Museum of Heilongjiang Provinces, re-evaluated and re-described Wulagasaurus dongi. Based on both original and assigned specimens, they concluded that Wulagasaurus shared many morphological similarities with North American taxon's Brachylophosaurus and Maiasaura, possibly forming a clade-structure within the already existing clade Brachylophosaurini. This hypothesis has been demonstrated by another phylogenetic 2014 analysis.

== See also ==
- Timeline of hadrosaur research
