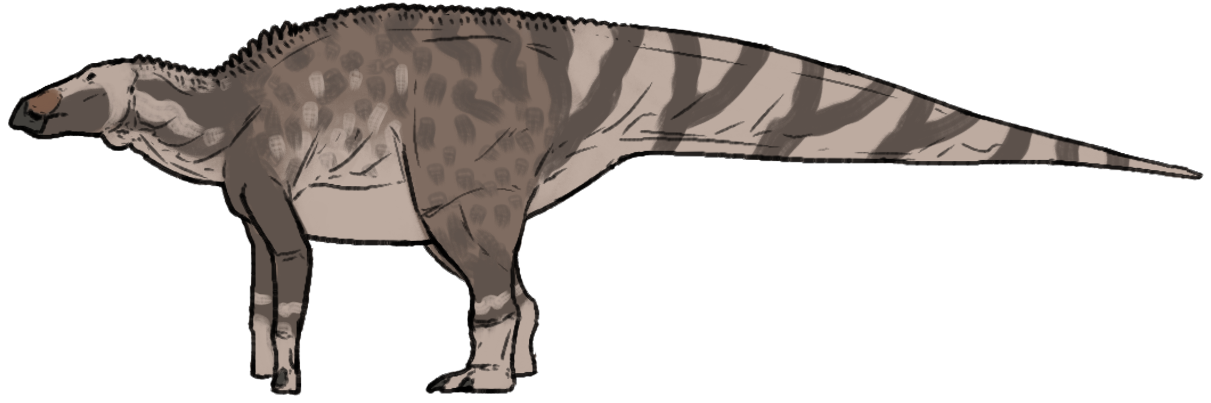
- Life restoration

Scientific classification
- Kingdom: Animalia
- Phylum: Chordata
- Class: Reptilia
- Clade: Dinosauria
- Clade: †Ornithischia
- Clade: †Ornithopoda
- Family: †Hadrosauridae
- Subfamily: †Saurolophinae
- Genus: †Kerberosaurus; Bolotsky and Godefroit, 2004
- Species: †K. manakini

Binomial name
- †Kerberosaurus manakini Bolotsky & Godefroit, 2004

Synonyms
- Kundurosaurus? Godefroit et al., 2012

= Kerberosaurus =

Kerberosaurus Temporal range: Late Cretaceous, 66 Ma

Extinct genus of dinosaurs

Kerberosaurus (meaning "Kerberos lizard") is a genus of saurolophine duckbill dinosaur from the late Maastrichtian-aged (Upper Cretaceous) Tsagayan Formation of Blagoveshchensk, Amur Region, Russia (dated to 66 million years ago). It is based on bonebed material including skull remains indicating that it was related to Saurolophus and Prosaurolophus.

== History ==
In 1984, Yuri Bolotsky and the Amur Complex Integrated Research Institute discovered a large dinosaur bonebed at Blagoveschensk. Most of the remains were of Amurosaurus (a lambeosaurine hadrosaur), but some came from turtles, crocodilians, theropods, nodosaurids, and a saurolophine. The cranial material (holotype AENM 1/319, a braincase, and other skull bones) of the saurolophine was sufficiently distinctive to permit the naming of a new taxon, Kerberosaurus manakini, described twenty years later.

== Description ==
Diagnostic characters included narrow frontals, unique form of the braincase, and a well-demarcated division between the area of bone surrounding the nostrils and the bone outside of it. No reconstruction of the fragmentary partial skull was offered. In their cladistic analysis, the authors found Kerberosaurus to be the sister taxon to Saurolophus and Prosaurolophus. It has been estimated to be around 8 meters (26 ft) in length.

== Paleobiogeography ==
Bolotsky and Godefroit (2004) found the paleobiogeographic implications interesting. The relationship they described provides additional support for land links and faunal interchange between eastern Asia and North America at the end of the Cretaceous, as the other two genera are either known only in North America or are known from a species there. The "sauroloph" group would have had to split from the nest closest group, the "edmontosaur" group, in the early Campanian, from Asia, and moved west while leaving a splinter population that would lead to Kerberosaurus, then return to Asia at a later point and produce Saurolophus angustirostris.

== Paleobiology ==
As a hadrosaurid, Kerberosaurus would have been a large bipedal\quadrupedal herbivore, consuming plant matter with complex dental batteries.

== See also ==
- Timeline of hadrosaur research
