= List of ornithopod type specimens =

This list of specimens is a comprehensive catalogue of all the type specimens and their scientific designations for each of the genera and species that are included in the clade ornithopoda.

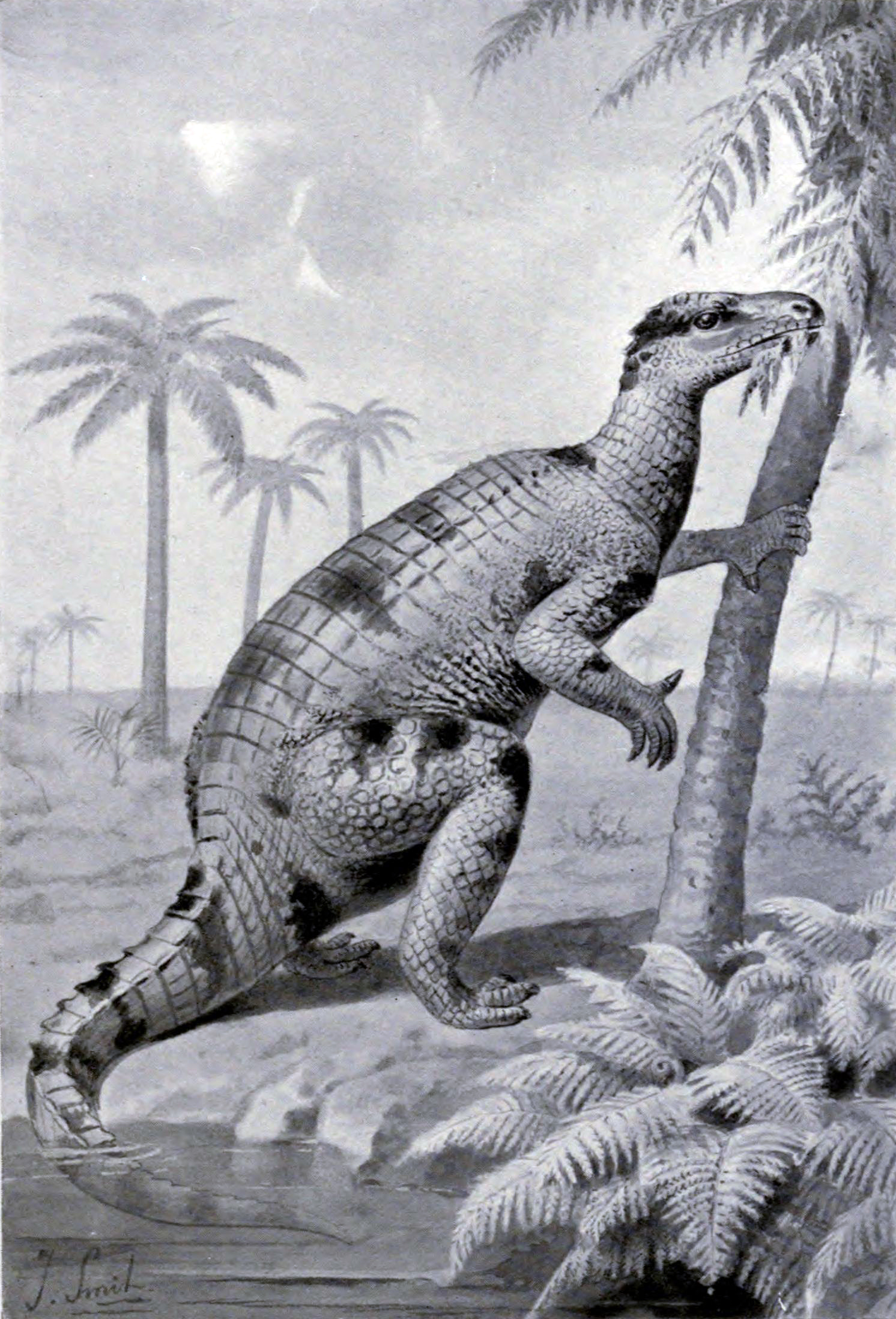
An early depiction of Iguanodon from the late 19th century

Ornithopoda is a clade of ornithischian dinosaurs that includes some of the most common and widespread Mesozoic animals including iguanodonts, hadrosaurs, and some animals formerly called "hypsilophodonts". The clade was named by Othniel Charles Marsh in 1881 and roughly means "bird feet". This name is reflective of the tridactyl feet of most ornithopods, which are superficially similar to many birds. Ornithopods were among the first dinosaurs known to scientists. The first species to be described was Iguanodon, which was described in 1825 by Sir Richard Owen. Today, they collectively comprise the most diverse ornithischian group.

The exact origin of ornithopods is uncertain. Some authors consider very primitive ornithischians like Nanosaurus, Hypsilophodon, and Jeholosaurus to be ornithopods, while others do not. Most ornithischians were ancestrally small and bipedal, which makes the taxonomy of these species complex and uncertain. However, they are generally agreed to have originated by the middle Jurassic and shortly thereafter, they proliferated to most of the world's continents. Ornithischians in general, but especially ornithopods, saw a large degree of diversification during the early Cretaceous. This culminated in the proliferation of the giant hadrosaurs across the Northern Hemisphere and even into Africa and South America. Ornithopod remains are known from all of the world's continents, including Antarctica.

== Scope and Terminology ==
This list will include the type fossils of each ornithopod species. In paleontology, a type specimen is one which is definitionally a member of a biological taxon. Additional specimens can only be "referred" to these taxa if an expert deems them sufficiently similar to the type and publishes that opinion in the scientific literature.

There is no complete, canonical list of all dinosaur taxa or holotype specimens. Attempts are regularly published in the form of books, such as the Princeton Field Guide to Dinosaurs by Gregory Paul and Dinosaurs: The Most Complete, Up-to-Date Encyclopedia for Dinosaur Lovers of All Ages by Thomas Holtz and Luis Rey. Where appropriate, The Paleobiology Database and Fossilworks, which are both online databases of named fossil taxa, are used to supplement the entries from published encyclopedias which are missing or data-deficient.

This list will also be updated regularly as new scientific descriptions are published and new taxa are named. The most recently named ornithopod is Minqaria bata, which was described in February 2024 by Nicholas R. Longrich, Xabier Pereda-Suberbiola, Nathalie Bardet, and Nour-Eddine Jalil.

=== Type System ===
Types are also used to diagnose higher-level taxa than an individual. One individual might represent the "type specimen" of a particular species. This species would in turn represent the "type species" of a particular genus, unless it is referred to a previously described genus. Most dinosaur genera are monospecific, therefore most type specimens are also the type species of their respective genera. On this list, the type species of a genus is only noted when it belongs to a genus with multiple referred species, such as Dryosaurus or Parasaurolophus. Furthermore, when an animal is different enough from its close relatives that it is given its own family, it is conventional in dinosaur systematics to name a family after the first described, most famous, or most abundant genus assigned to it. Therefore, on this list, the type species of any type genus for a family or sub-family level taxon is also noted when appropriate.

There are several different varieties of type specimen when referring to fossil animals:

- Holotype: This is the most common and simplest form of type specimen. A holotype is the first material of a fossil taxon that is described in the scientific literature. In order to qualify as a true holotype, all of the fossils of the type must belong to the same individual animal. All type specimens on this list are holotypes, unless otherwise indicated.
- Paratype(s): These are described in the same publication as the holotype. A paratype is designated when the fossil material is diagnostic enough to belong to the same species as the holotype, but it is not from the same individual animal. In these cases, the holotype and paratype(s) are collectively called the "type series" for that taxon. On this list, paratypes are noted in the same entry as their associated holotype.
- Neotype: When a holotype specimen is lost, destroyed, or otherwise unable to be studied further by scientists, a new type specimen for that taxon is required in order to identify future material. On this list, neotypes are only given their own entries when the holotype was never formally given a specimen number, otherwise they are noted in the entry for the holotype.
- Syntype(s): This is a type series in which no single specimen is selected to serve as a holotype, nor are any designated as paratypes. This is typically done if the fossil material is believed to be from multiple animals, but none of the individual animals were well-preserved enough to provide a complete list of diagnostic characters. These are also sometimes called "cotypes" in publications, although this is discouraged by the ICZN.
- Lectotype: When a single type specimen from a series of syntypes is designated as the new primary type specimen in a subsequent publication, this is considered to be a lectotype. On this list, lectotypes are given their own entries.
- Paralectotype(s): When a lectotype is designated from a series of syntypes, the remaining syntypes become paralectotypes as part of a reorganized type series. On this list, paralectotypes are noted alongside the list entry for the lectotype of their respective series.
- Plastotype: Sometimes, if a cast of a type specimen is made and the original type specimen is lost or destroyed, the cast can be used for the purposes of diagnostic referral to a taxon. Plastotypes are only given their own entries on this list if the holotype was not given a specimen number. Otherwise, they are noted alongside the entry for the holotype.
- Topotype: When a specimen is discovered from the same locality as a holotype specimen it may be given a new specimen number. If the second specimen is later determined to belong to the same animal as the holotype after the holotype has been described, it becomes a topotype.

All name-bearing type specimens (i.e. holotypes, lectotypes, neotypes, and syntypes) have unique entries on this list, and non-name-bearing types (i.e. paratypes, paralectotypes, topotypes, and holotypes that have been subsumed by a neotype) are noted alongside their name-bearing counterpart.

=== Validity ===
Some described species are later determined to be invalid by subsequent scientific publications. However, invalid species are sometimes resurrected, such as in the case of Brontosaurus, and sometimes the validity of a species can be controversial among researchers (e.g. the case of Torosaurus and Triceratops). For the purposes of neutrality and completeness, all described species and genera of marginocephalians are included, even those that have been considered invalid in subsequent scientific publications.

Naming conventions and terminology follow the International Code of Zoological Nomenclature (ICZN). Technical terms used include:

- Junior synonym: A name which describes the same taxon as a previously published name. If two or more taxa are formally designated and the type specimens are later assigned to the same taxon, the first to be published (in chronological order) is the senior synonym, and all other instances are junior synonyms. Senior synonyms are generally used, except by special decision of the ICZN, but junior synonyms cannot be used again, even if deprecated. Junior synonymy is often subjective, unless the genera described were both based on the same type specimen.
- Nomen dubium (Latin for "dubious name"): A name describing a fossil with no unique diagnostic features. T his can be an extremely controversial designation, and as such, they are only notated when their supposedly dubious status has been formally published. Furthermore, if the scientific community has yet to reach a consensus on the validity of a name or taxon, the ongoing nature of the controversy will be stated.
- Nomen nudum (Latin for "naked name"): A name that has appeared in print but has not yet been formally published by the standards of the ICZN. Nomina nuda (the plural form) are invalid, and are not included on this list.
- Preoccupied name: A name that is formally published, but which has already been used for another taxon. This second use is invalid (as are all subsequent uses) and the name must be replaced.

=== Omissions ===
Some ornithopod taxa are not included on this list. Nomina nuda are not included because a type does not become recognized by the ICZN until it is published in a scientific journal with a full description.

Some misidentified taxa are also not included so long as there is a scientific consensus with regard to the specimen in question. If a specimen is later referred to a taxon outside ornithopoda, it is not included on this list. However, specimens that are identified as ornithopods in publications subsequent to their initial description are included under the name they are given within ornithopoda.

Referred taxa are only included on the list as separate entries when their initial description includes a unique type specimen.

In the case of specimens with uncertain taxonomic affinity, they will be excluded unless they are considered ornithopods by the most recently published nomenclatural study of ornithischian dinosaurs, published in 2021. This excludes animals like Jeholosaurus and Thescelosaurus, which are considered basal neornithischians by the authors. This is the same definition used on the article "Ornithopoda".

== List of Specimens ==
- Binomial name: All animals species are given a unique binomial name, typically consisting of Latin or Greek words which are used to formally and scientifically identify each species.
- Catalogue number: In most museum collections, each fossil specimen will be given a unique catalogue number which is published with the description of the fossils after they are prepared. This serves as a formal name for every single described fossil so that authors are able to refer to individual fossil discoveries in the scientific literature by name.
- Institution: Most published fossils are stored in museum collections or at universities. This is also true of type specimens, many of which are on display in museums around the world. If a type specimen has been lost, the last known location of the type is listed.
- Age: The geological stage from which the specimen was recovered is listed, when it is known. The exact age of some geological formations is not known. If this is the case, a range of possible ages is given.
- Unit: Most fossils are recovered from named geologic formations (e.g. the Morrison Formation or the Hell Creek Formation). When this is not the case, a city or landmark near the locality from which the fossil was recovered is listed.
- Material: The vast majority of fossils do not preserve the complete skeleton of an animal. In these cases, the specific bones which are fossilized have been listed.
- Notes: Other general information, such as the validity status of the taxon in question, or any other material in the type series may be listed here.

Species	Genus	Nickname	Catalogue number	Institution	Age	Unit	Country	Notes	Images
Acristavus gagslarsoni	Acristavus		MOR 1155	Museum of the Rockies	Campanian	Two Medicine Formation	United States		
Adelolophus hutchisoni	Adelolophus		UCMP 152028	University of California Museum of Paleontology	Campanian	Wahweap Formation	United States		Holotype maxilla of Adelolophus hutchisoni
Adynomosaurus arcanus	Adynomosaurus		MCD 7125	Museu de la Conca Dellà	Maastrichtian	Conques Formation	Spain		
Ajnabia odysseus	Ajnabia		MHNM KHG 222	Marrakech Museum of Natural History	Late Maastrichtian	Upper Couche III	Morocco		Holotype maxilla of Ajnabia odysseus
Altirhinus kurzanovi	Altirhinus		PIN 3386/8	Paleontological Institute, Russian Academy of Sciences	Late Aptian-Albian	Khuren Dukh Formation	Mongolia		
Amurosaurus riabinini	Amurosaurus		AEHM 1/12	Amur Natural History Museum	Middle-Late Maastrichtian	Udurchukan Formation	Russia		Left dentary of Amurosaurus riabinini
Anabisetia saldiviai	Anabisetia		MCF-PVPH 74	Museo Carmen Funes	Cenomanian	Lisandro Formation	Argentina		
Anasazisaurus horneri	Anasazisaurus		BYU 12950	Brigham Young University Museum of Paleontology	Early Maastrichtian	Kirtland Formation	United States		
Angulomastacator daviesi	Angulomastacator		TxVP 43681–1	Texas Vertebrate Paleontology Collections, Jackson School Museum of Earth History, The University of Texas at Austin	Campanian	Upper Shale Member, Aguja Formation	United States		
Aquilarhinus palimentus	Aquilarhinus		TxVP 42452-1	Texas Vertebrate Paleontology Collections, Jackson School Museum of Earth History, The University of Texas at Austin	Campanian	Lower Shale Member, Aguja Formation	United States		
Aralosaurus tuberiferus	Aralosaurus		PIN 2229	Paleontological Institute, Russian Academy of Sciences	Late Cretaceous (Turonian?)	Beleutinskaya Svita	Kazakhstan		
Arenysaurus ardevoli	Arenysaurus		MPZ 2008/1	Museo Paleontológico de la Universidad de Zaragoza	Late Maastrichtian	Tremp Formation	Spain		Holotype skull roof (E) of Arenysaurus ardevoli
Arstanosaurus akkurganensis	Arstanosaurus		IZAA 1/1	Institute of Zoology of the Kazakhstan Academy of Sciences	Tentatively Santonian-Campanian	Bostobinskaya Svita	Kazakhstan		
Atlascopcosaurus loadsi	Atlascopcosaurus		NMV P166409	Museums Victoria	Albian	Eumeralla Formation	Australia		Cast of holotype left maxilla (3) of Atlascopcosaurus loadsi
Augustynolophus morrisi	Augustynolophus		LACM/CIT 2852	Natural History Museum of Los Angeles County	Lower Maastrichtian	Moreno Formation	United States		Holotype skull of Augustynolophus morrisi
Bactrosaurus johnsoni	Bactrosaurus		AMNH 6553	American Museum of Natural History	Late Cretaceous	Iren Dabasu Formation	China		Holotype maxilla (A) of Bactrosaurus johnsoni
Barilium dawsoni	Barilium		NHMUK R798, R798b, R799, R800-R806, R4771, R4742	Natural History Museum, London	Valanginian	Hastings Subgroup, Wadhurst Clay Formation	United Kingdom		
Barsboldia sicinskii	Barsboldia		ZPAL MgD-1/110	Institute of Paleobiology, Polish Academy of Sciences	Upper Campanian-Maastrichtian	Nemegt Formation	Mongolia		Holotype sacrum of Barsboldia sicinskii
Batyrosaurus rozhdestvenskyi	Batyrosaurus		AEHM 4/1	Amur Natural History Museum	Santonian-Campanian	Bostobinskaya Svita	Kazakhstan		
Bayannurosaurus perfectus	Bayannurosaurus		IMMNH PV00001	Inner Mongolia Museum of Natural History	Early Aptian	Bayingebi Formation	China		
Blasisaurus canudoi	Blasisaurus		MPZ99/667	Museo Paleontológico de la Universidad de Zaragoza	Latest Maastrichtian	Arén Formation	Spain		The holotype jugal (c) of Blasisaurus canudoi
Bolong yixianensis	Bolong		YHZ-001	Yizhou Fossil Museum	Barremian-Aptian	Yixian Formation	China		
Bonapartesaurus rionegrensis	Bonapartesaurus		MCPA-Pv SM2	Museo Provincial Carlos Ameghino	Late Campanian-Early Maastrichtian	Allen Formation	Argentina		
Brachylophosaurus canadensis	Brachylophosaurus		CMN 8893	Canadian Museum of Nature	>77.76 Ma (Campanian)	Oldman Formation	Canada		Holotype premaxilla (J) of Brachylophosaurus canadensis
Brighstoneus simmondsi	Brighstoneus		MIWG 6344	Dinosaur Isle Museum	Early Barremian	Wessex Formation	United Kingdom		Holotype material of Brighstoneus simmondsi
Burianosaurus augustai	Burianosaurus		NMP Ob 203	National Museum Prague	Late Cenomanian	Peruc-Korycany Formation	Czechia		Holotype femur of Burianosaurus augustai
Callovosaurus leedsi	Callovosaurus		BMNH R1993	Natural History Museum, London	Middle Callovian	Peterborough Member, Oxford Clay Formation	United Kingdom		Holotype femur of Callovosaurus leedsi
Calvarius rapidus	Calvarius		MCD-8734	Museu de la Conca Dellà, Isona	Maastrichtian	Talarn Formation, Tremp Group	Spain		
Camptosaurus dispar	Camptosaurus		YPM 1877	Peabody Museum of Natural History	Upper Jurassic	Morrison Formation	United States		
Canardia garonnensis	Canardia		MDE-Ma3–16	Musée des Dinosaures d'Espéraza	Upper Maastrichtian	Marnes d'Auzas Formation	France		Holotype maxilla of Canardia garonnensis
Cedrorestes crichtoni	Cedrorestes		DMNH 47994	Denver Museum of Nature and Science	Lower Cretaceous (Barremian?)	Cedar Mountain Formation	United States		Holotype ilium of Cedrorestes crichtoni
Changmiania liaoningensis	Changmiania		PMOL AD00114	Paleontological Museum of Liaoning	Barremian	Yixian Formation	China		Holotype skeleton of Changmiania liaoningensis
Charonosaurus jiayinensis	Charonosaurus		CUST J-V1251-57	Changchun University of Sciences and Technology	Late Maastrichtian	Yuliangze Formation	China		
Choyrodon barsboldi	Choyrodon		MPC-D 100/801	Institute of Paleontology and Geology, Mongolian Academy of Sciences	Middle-Late Albian	Khuren Dukh Formation	Mongolia		Holotype skull of Choyrodon barsboldi
Cionodon arctatus	Cionodon		AMNH 3951	American Museum of Natural History	Late Cretaceous	Laramie Formation	United States	Nomen dubium	
Claosaurus agilis	Claosaurus		YPM 1190	Peabody Museum of Natural History	Late Coniacian	Smoky Hill Chalk Member, Niobrara Chalk	United States		Holotype skeleton of Claosaurus agilis
Convolosaurus marri	Convolosaurus		SMU 72834	Shuler Museum of Paleontology	Aptian	Twin Mountains Formation	United States		
Corythosaurus casuarius	Corythosaurus		AMNH 5240	American Museum of Natural History	Cretaceous	Belly River Group	Canada		Holotype of Corythosaurus casuarius
Cumnoria prestwichii	Cumnoria		OUM J.3303	Oxford University Museum of Natural History	Upper Jurassic	Kimmeridge Clay	United Kingdom		Holotype skeleton of Cumnoria prestwichii
Dakotadon lakotaensis	Dakotadon		SDSM 8656	South Dakota School of Mines and Technology	Early Cretaceous (Barremian?)	Lakota Formation	United States		Holotype skull of Dakotadon lakotaensis
Darwinsaurus evolutionis	Darwinsaurus		NHMUK R1831, NHMUK R1833, NHMUK R1835 and NHMUK R1836	Natural History Museum, London	Valanginian	Wadhurst Clay Formation	United Kingdom	Nomen dubium, type specimens can be referred to Hypselospinus fittoni and Mantellisaurus atherfieldensis	
Datonglong tianzhensis	Datonglong		SXMG V 00005	Shanxi Museum of Geology	Upper Cretaceous	Huiquanpu Formation	China		
Delapparentia turolensis	Delapparentia		MPT/I.G	Museo de Teruel	Lower Barremian	Camarillas Formation	Spain		
Diclonius pentagonus	Diclonius		AMNH 3972	American Museum of Natural History	Campanian	Judith River Formation	United States	Nomen dubium	
Diluvicursor pickeringi	Diluvicursor		NMV P221080	Museums Victoria	Lower Albian	Eumeralla Formation	Australia		Holotype skeleton of Diluvicursor pickeringi
Draconyx loureiroi	Draconyx		ML 357	Museum of Lourinhã	Tithonian	Praia Azul Member, Lourinhã Formation	Portugal		
Dryosaurus altus	Dryosaurus		YPM 1876	Peabody Museum of Natural History	Upper Kimmeridgian?	Morrison Formation	United States		
Dryosaurus elderae	Dryosaurus		CM 3392	Carnegie Museum of Natural History	Upper Jurassic	Morrison Formation	United States		Holotype skeleton of Dryosaurus elderae
Dysalotosaurus lettowvorbecki	Dysalotosaurus				Kimmeridgian	Tendaguru Beds	Tanzania		
Edmontosaurus annectens	Edmontosaurus		USNM 2414	National Museum of Natural History	Maastrichtian	Lance Formation	United States		Historical reconstruction of USNM 2414, the holotype of Edmontosaurus annectens.
Edmontosaurus regalis	Edmontosaurus		Holotype: CMN 2288 Paratype: CMN 2289	Canadian Museum of Nature	Campanian	Horsethief Member, Horseshoe Canyon Formation	Canada		Holotype skull (CMN 2288) of Edmontosaurus regalis
Elrhazosaurus nigeriensis	Elrhazosaurus		MNHN GDF 332	Muséum National d'Histoire Naturelle	Aptian	Elrhaz Formation	Niger		
Eolambia caroljonesa	Eolambia		CEUM 9758	USU Eastern Prehistoric Museum	Albian-Cenomanian	Mussentuchit Member, Cedar Mountain Formation	United States		Holotype dentary of Eolambia caroljonesa
Eotrachodon orientalis	Eotrachodon		MSC 7949	McWane Science Center	Latest Santonian	Mooreville Chalk	United States		Holotype premaxilla of Eotrachodon orientalis
Eousdryosaurus nanohallucis	Eousdryosaurus		SHN(JJS)-170	Sociedade de Historia Natural	Upper Kimmeridgian	Alcobaça Formation	Portugal		
Equijubus normani	Equijubus		IVPP V12534	Institute of Vertebrate Paleontology and Paleoanthropology	Early Cretaceous	Xinminbao Group	China		The type maxilla of Equijubus normani
Eucercosaurus tanyspondylus	Eucercosaurus		Syntypes: CAMSM B55610–29	Sedgwick Museum of Earth Sciences	Upper Albian	Gault Formation, reworked into Cambridge Greensand	United Kingdom	Nomen dubium	
Fostoria dhimbangunmal	Fostoria		LRF 3050.A	Australian Opal Centre	Cenomanian	Griman Creek Formation	Australia		
Fukuisaurus tetoriensis	Fukuisaurus		FPDM-V-40-1 and FPDM-V-40-2	Fukui Prefectural Dinosaur Museum	Late Hauterivian-Barremian	Kitadani Formation	Japan		
Fulgurotherium australe	Fulgurotherium		BMNH R 3719	Natural History Museum, London	Albian	Wallangalla Sandstone Member, Griman Creek Formation	Australia	Nomen dubium	Holotype femur of Fulgurotherium australe
Fylax thyrakolasus	Fylax		IPS-36338	Museu de l'Institut Català de Paleontologia Miquel Crusafont	Maastrichtian	Figuerola Formation	Spain		Holotype dentary of Fylax thyrakolasus
Galleonosaurus dorisae	Galleonosaurus		NMV P229196	Museums Victoria	Upper Barremian	Wonthaggi Formation	Australia		Holotype maxilla (1, 2) of Galleonosaurus dorisae
Gasparinisaura cincosaltensis	Gasparinisaura		MUCPv-208	Museum of the Universidad Nacional del Comahue	Coniacian-Santonian	Anacleto Member, Río Colorado Formation	Argentina		
Gideonmantellia amosanjuanae	Gideonmantellia		MPG-PBCH	Museo Paleontológico de Galve	Barremian	Camarillas Formation	Spain		
Gilmoreosaurus mongoliensis	Gilmoreosaurus		AMNH 6551	American Museum of Natural History	Cenomanian?	Iren Dabasu Formation	China		Holotype humerus, radius, and ulna of Gilmoreosaurus mongoliensis
Glishades ericksoni	Glishades		AMNH 27414	American Museum of Natural History	Upper Cretaceous	Two Medicine Formation	United States		
Gobihadros mongoliensis	Gobihadros		MPC-D100/746	Mongolian Paleontological Center	Cenomanian-Santonian	Baynshire Formation	Mongolia		Holotype mandible of Gobihadros mongoliensis
Gongpoquansaurus mazongshanensis	Gongpoquansaurus		IVPP V 11333	Institute of VertebratePaleontology and Paleoanthropology	Albian	Zhonggou Formation	China		
Gonkoken nanoi	Gonkoken		CPAP 3054	Paleontological Collection of Antarctica and Patagonia	Lower Maastrichtian	Dorotea Formation	Chile		Holotype specimen (O) of Gonkoken nanoi
Gryposaurus latidens	Gryposaurus		AMNH FARB 5465	American Museum of Natural History	Campanian	Two Medicine Formation	United States		
Gryposaurus monumentensis	Gryposaurus		RAM 6797	Raymond M. Alf Museum of Palaeontology	Late Campanian	Kaiparowits Formation	United States		Cast of the holotype skull of Gryposaurus monumentensis
Gryposaurus notabilis	Gryposaurus		CMN 2278	Canadian Museum of Nature	Campanian	Dinosaur Park Formation	Canada		Holotype premaxilla (L) of Gryposaurus notabilis
Hadrosaurus foulkii	Hadrosaurus		ANSP 9201-9204, 10005	Academy of Natural Sciences of Philadelphia	Campanian	Woodbury Formation	United States		Holotype elements of Hadrosaurus foulkii
Hippodraco scutodens	Hippodraco		UMNH VP 20208	Utah Museum of Natural History	Upper Barremian—Lowermost Aptian	Yellow Cat Member, Cedar Mountain Formation	United States		Holotype elements of Hippodraco scutodens
Huallasaurus australis	Huallasaurus		MACN-PV 2	Museo Argentino de Ciencias Naturales Bernardino Rivadavia	Campanian-Maastrichtian	Los Alamitos Formation	Argentina		
Huehuecanauhtlus tiquichensis	Huehuecanauhtlus		IGM 6253	Instituto de Geología, Universidad Nacional Autónoma de México	Santonian		Mexico		
Huxleysaurus hollingtoniensis	Huxleysaurus		NHMUK R1148	Natural History Museum, London		Wadhurst Clay Formation	United Kingdom	Nomen dubium, referred to Hypselospinus fittoni	Holotype third metatarsal of Huxleysaurus hollingtoniensis
Hypacrosaurus altispinus	Hypacrosaurus		AMNH 5204	American Museum of Natural History	Upper Cretaceous	Horseshoe Canyon Formation	Canada		
Hypacrosaurus stebingeri	Hypacrosaurus		MOR 549	Museum of the Rockies	Late Cretaceous		United States		Holotype skull of Hypacrosaurus stebingeri
Hypselospinus fittoni	Hypselospinus		NHMUK R1635	Natural History Museum, London	Valanginian	Wadhurst Clay Formation	United Kingdom		
Hypsibema crassicauda	Hypsibema		USNM 7189	National Museum of Natural History	Cretaceous	Black Creek Formation	United States		
Hypsibema missouriensis	Hypsibema		USNM 16733	National Museum of Natural History	Early Maastrichtian?	Ripley Formation	United States		
Iani smithi	Iani		NCSM 29373	North Carolina Museum of Natural Sciences	Cenomanian	Mussentuchit Member, Cedar Mountain Formation	United States		
Iguanacolossus fortis	Iguanacolossus		UMNH VP 20205	Utah Museum of Natural History	Lower Barremian	Yellow Cat Member, Cedar Mountain Formation	United States		Holotype ilium and pubis of Iguanacolossus fortis
Iguanodon bernissartensis	Iguanodon		IRSNB 1534	Royal Belgian Institute of Natural Sciences	Upper Barremian-Lowermost Aptian	Sainte-Barbe Clays Formation	Belgium		
Iguanodon galvensis	Iguanodon		MAP-4787	Museo Aragonés de Paleontología	Lower Barremian	Camarillas Formation	Spain		
Isasicursor santacrucensis	Isasicursor		MPM 21525	Museo Padre Molina	Upper Campanian-Lower Maastrichtian	Chorillo Formation	Argentina		
Iyuku raathi	Iyuku		AM 6150	Albany Museum	Valanginian	Kirkwood Formation	South Africa		
Jaxartosaurus aralensis	Jaxartosaurus		PIN 1/5009	Paleontological Institute, Russian Academy of Sciences	Lower Santonian	Dabrazinskaya Svita	Kazakhstan		
Jeyawati rugoculus	Jeyawati		MSM P4166	Arizona Museum of Natural History	Turonian	Moreno Hill Formation	United States		
Jintasaurus meniscus	Jintasaurus		FDRC: GJ 06-2-52	Fossil Research and Development Center, Third Geology and Mineral Resources Exploration Academy of the Gansu Provincial Bureau of Geo-Exploration and Mineral Development	Early Cretaceous (Albian?)	Xinminpu Group	China		
Jinzhousaurus yangi	Jinzhousaurus		IVPP V12691	Institute of Vertebrate Paleontology and Paleoanthropology	Hauterivian-Barremian	Yixian Formation	China		Holotype skull of Jinzhousaurus yangi
Kamuysaurus japonicus	Kamuysaurus		HMG-1219	Hobetsu Museum	Early Maastrichtian	Hakobuchi Formation, Yezo Group	Japan		Holotype skeleton of Kamuysaurus japonicus
Kangnasaurus coetzeei	Kangnasaurus		SAM 2732	Iziko South African Museum			South Africa		
Kazaklambia convincens	Kazaklambia		PIN 2230/1	Paleontological Institute, Russian Academy of Sciences	Santonian	Dabrazinskaya Svita	Kazakhstan		
Kelumapusaura machi	Kelumapusaura		MPCN-PV-807	Museo Patagónico de Ciencias Naturales Juan Carlos Salgado	Maastrichtian	Allen Formation	Argentina		
Kerberosaurus manakini	Kerberosaurus		AENM 1/319	Amur Natural History Museum	Maastrichtian	Tsagayan Formation	Russia		
Koshisaurus katsuyama	Koshisaurus				Early Cretaceous	Kitadani Formation	Japan		
Koutalisaurus kohlerorum	Koutalisaurus		IPS SRA 27	Institut de Paleontologia Miquel Crusafont	Maastrichtian	Tremp Formation	Spain	Likely synonymous with Pararhabdodon isonensis	Holotype dentary of Koutalisaurus kohlerorum
Kritosaurus navajovius	Kritosaurus		AMNH 5799	American Museum of Natural History	Cretaceous	Ojo Alamo Formation	United States		Holotype skull of Kritosaurus navajovius
Kukufeldia tilgatensis	Kukufeldia		NHMUK 28660	Natural History Museum, London	Middle-Upper Valanginian	Grinstead Clay Member, Tunbridge Wells Sand Formation	United Kingdom		Holotype maxilla of Kukufeldia tilgatensis
Kundurosaurus nagornyi	Kundurosaurus		AENM 2/921	Amur Natural History Museum	Maastrichtian	Udurchukan Formation	Russia		Holotype skull of Kundurosaurus nagornyi
Laiyangosaurus youngi	Laiyangosaurus		IVPP V 23401	Institute of Vertebrate Paleontology and Paleoanthropology	Upper Cretaceous	Jingangkou Formation, Wangshi Group	China		
Lambeosaurus clavinitialis	Lambeosaurus				Campanian	Oldman Formation	Canada		
Lambeosaurus lambei	Lambeosaurus		CMN 2869	Canadian Museum of Nature	Upper Cretaceous	Belly River Formation	Canada		
Lambeosaurus magnicristatus	Lambeosaurus		CMN 8705	Canadian Museum of Nature	Late Cretaceous	Dinosaur Park Formation	Canada		Holotype skull of Lambeosaurus magnicristatus
Lanzhousaurus magnidens	Lanzhousaurus		GSLTZP01-001	Fossil Research and Development Center of the Third Geology and Mineral Resources Exploration Academy of Gansu Province	Early Cretaceous	Hekou Group	China		
Lapampasaurus cholinoi	Lapampasaurus		MPHN-Pv-01	Museo Provincial de Historia Natural	Late Campanian-Early Maastrichtian	Allen Formation	Argentina		
Latirhinus uitstlani	Latirhinus		IGM 6583	Instituto de Geología, Universidad Nacional Autónoma de México	Upper Campanian	Cerro del Pueblo Formation	Mexico		
Levnesovia transoxiana	Levnesovia		USNM 538191	National Museum of Natural History	Middle–Late Turonian	Bissekty Formation	Uzbekistan		
Loncosaurus argentinus	Loncosaurus		MACN-1629	Museo Argentino de Ciencias Naturales Bernardino Rivadavia	Upper Cretaceous?		Argentina	Nomen vanum	
Lophorhothon atopus	Lophorhothon		FMNH P 27383	Field Museum of Natural History	Late Cretaceous	Mooreville Chalk Formation	United States		Holotype elements (A-F, I, K) of Lophorhothon atopus
Lurdusaurus arenatus	Lurdusaurus		MNHN GDF 1700	Muséum National d'Histoire Naturelle	Aptian	Elrhaz Formation	Niger		
Macrogryphosaurus gondwanicus	Macrogryphosaurus		MUCPv-321	Museo Universidad Nacional del Comahue	Coniacian	Portezuelo Formation	Argentina		
Magnamanus soriaensis	Magnamanus		MNS 200/132, 2001/122, 2002/95, 2003/69, 2004/54	Museo Numantino de Soria	Upper Hauterivian-Lower Barremian	Golmayo Formation	Spain		
Magnapaulia laticaudus	Magnapaulia		LACM 17715	Natural History Museum of Los Angeles County	Campanian	El Gallo Formation	Mexico		Type left premaxilla of Magnapaulia laticaudus
Mahuidacursor lipanglef	Mahuidacursor		MAU-Pv-CO-596	Museo Municipal Argentino Urquiza	Santonian	Bajo de la Carpa Formation	Argentina		
Maiasaura peeblesorum	Maiasaura		YPM-PU 22405	Peabody Museum of Natural History	Campanian	Two Medicine Formation	United States		
Malefica deckerti	Malefica		TxVP 41917-1	Jackson School Museum of Earth History	Late Campanian	Aguja Formation	United States		
Mandschurosaurus amurense	Mandschurosaurus				Cretaceous	Yuliangze Formation	China	Nomen dubium	Holotype elements of Mandschurosaurus amurensis
Mantellisaurus atherfieldensis	Mantellisaurus		NHMUK R5764	Natural History Museum, London	Barremian-Aptian	Vectis Formation	United Kingdom		Holotype skeleton of Mantellisaurus atherfieldensis
Mantellodon carpenteri	Mantellodon		NHMUK R3741	Natural History Museum, London	Lower Aptian	Lower Greensand Formation	United Kingdom	Nomen dubium, can be referred to Mantellisaurus atherfieldensis	
Matheronodon provincialis	Matheronodon		MMS/VBN-02-102	Musée du Moulin Seigneurial	Late Campanian		France		Right maxilla of Matheronodon provincialis
Microhadrosaurus nanshiungensis	Microhadrosaurus		IVPP V4732	Institute of Vertebrate Paleontology and Paleoanthropology	Late Cretaceous	Nanxiong Formation	China		
Minqaria bata	Minqaria		MHNM.KHG.1395	Museum d'Histoire Naturelle de Marrakech, Cadi Ayyad University	Upper Maastrichtian	Ouled Abdoun Basin	Morocco		Reconstructed skull of Minqaria bata
Mochlodon suessi	Mochlodon		PIUW 2349	Paläontologisches Institut, University of Vienna	Lower Campanian	Grünbach Formation	Austria		Holotype dentary of Mochlodon suessi
Mochlodon vorosi	Mochlodon		MTM V 2010.105.1	Hungarian Natural History Museum	Santonian	Csehbánya Formation	Hungary		Holotype (F-H) of Mochlodon vorosi
Morelladon beltrani	Morelladon		CMP-MS-03	Museo de la Valltorta	Barremian	Arcillas de Morella Formation	Spain		Holotype pelvis of Morelladon beltrani
Morrosaurus antarcticus	Morrosaurus		MACN Pv 197	Bernardino Rivadavia Natural Sciences Argentine Museum	Maastrichtian	Cape Lamb Member, López de Bertodano Formation	Antarctica		
Muttaburrasaurus langdoni	Muttaburrasaurus		QM F6140	Queensland Museum	Albian	Mackunda Formation	Australia		
Naashoibitosaurus ostromi	Naashoibitosaurus		NMMNH P-16106	New Mexico Museum of Natural History and Science	Late Campanian	Kirtland Formation	United States		
Nanningosaurus dashiensis	Nanningosaurus		NHMG8142	Natural History Museum of Guangxi	Upper Cretaceous	Nadu Formation	China		
Nanyangosaurus zhugeii	Nanyangosaurus		IVPP V 11821	Institute of Vertebrate Paleontology and Paleoanthropology	Early Cretaceous	Xiaguan Formation	China		
Napaisaurus guangxiensis	Napaisaurus		FS-20-007, FS-20-007		Early Cretaceous	Xinlong Basin	China		
Nipponosaurus sachalinensis	Nipponosaurus		UHR 6590	University of Hokkaido	Late Santonian-Early Campanian	Upper Yezo Group	Russia		
Notohypsilophodon comodorensis	Notohypsilophodon		UNPSJB — PV 942	National University of the Patagonia San Juan Bosco	Cenomanian?	Bajo Barreal Formation	Argentina		
Obelignathus septimanicus	Obelignathus		MDE D30	Musée des Dinosaures	Late Campanian-Early Maastrichtian	Grès à Reptiles	France		Holotype dentary of Obelignathus septimanicus
Oblitosaurus bunnueli	Oblitosaurus		CPT-1440, CPT-1444, and MAP-8290 to MAP-8299	Museo Aragonés de Paleontología	Late Jurassic	Villar del Arzobispo Formation	Spain		
Oligosaurus adelus	Oligosaurus		PIUW 3518	Paläontologisches Institut der Universität Wien	Late Cretaceous	Gosau Group	Austria		
Olorotitan arharensis	Olorotitan		AEHM 2/845	Amur Natural History Museum	Middle-Late Maastrichtian	Tsagayan Formation	Russia		Holotype skeleton of Olorotitan arharensis
Ornatops incantatus	Ornatops		WSC 10058	Western Science Center	Middle Campanian	Allison Member, Menefee Formation	United States		Holotype braincase of Ornatops incantatus
Ornithomerus gracilis	Ornithomerus		PIUW 2349/3	Paläontologisches Institut der Universität Wien	Late Cretaceous	Gosau Group	Austria		
Orthomerus dolloi	Orthomerus		NHMUK 42954-57	Natural History Museum, London	Late Maastrichtian	Likely Maastricht Formation	The Netherlands or Belgium		Lectotype femur of Orthomerus dolloi
Osmakasaurus depressus	Osmakasaurus		USNM 4753	National Museum of Natural History	Barremian-Aptian	Lakota Formation	United States		
Ouranosaurus nigeriensis	Ouranosaurus		MNHN GDF 300	Muséum National d'Histoire Naturelle	Late Aptian	Upper Elrhaz Formation	Niger		
Owenodon hoggii	Owenodon		NHM R2998	Natural History Museum, London	Mid-Berriasian	Purbeck Limestone Formation	United Kingdom		Holotype of Owenodon hoggii
Pararhabdodon isonensis	Pararhabdodon		Holotype: IPS SRA 1 Paratype: IPS SRA 15-18	Institut de Paleontologia Miquel Crusafont	Maastrichtian	Tremp Formation	Spain		
Parasaurolophus cyrtocristatus	Parasaurolophus		FMNH P-27393	Field Museum of Natural History	Campanian(75.02-76.14 Ma)	Fossil Forest Member, Fruitland Formation	United States		The holotype skeleton of Parasaurolophus cyrtocristatus
Parasaurolophus tubicen	Parasaurolophus		PMU.R.1250	Paleontologiska Museet, Uppsala	Campanian(73.5-73.6 Ma)	Kirtland Formation	United States		Holotype skull (C) of Parasaurolophus tubicen
Parasaurolophus walkeri	Parasaurolophus		ROM 768	Royal Ontario Museum	Campanian(76.8-76.9 Ma)	Dinosaur Park Formation	Canada		The holotype skeleton of Parasaurolophus walkeri
Pareisactus evrostos	Pareisactus		MCD 5371	Museu de la Conca Dellà	Lower Maastrichtian	Conques Formation	Spain		
Parksosaurus warreni	Parksosaurus		ROM 804	Royal Ontario Museum	Campanian-Maastrichtian	Horseshoe Canyon Formation	Canada		
Penelopognathus weishampeli	Penelopognathus		IMM 2002-BYGB-1	Inner Mongolia Museum	Albian	Bayan Gobi Formation	China		
Planicoxa venenica	Planicoxa		DMNH 42504	Denver Museum of Natural History	Lower Cretaceous	Poison Strip Member, Cedar Mountain Formation	United States		
Plesiohadros djadokhtaensis	Plesiohadros		MPC-D100/745	Mongolian Paleontology Center	Upper Campanian?	Djadokhta Formation	Mongolia		
Portellsaurus sosbaynati	Portellsaurus		MQ98-II-1	Colección Museográfica de Cinctorres	Barremian	Margas de Mirambell Formation	Spain		Holotype dentary of Portellsaurus sosbaynati
Proa valdearinnoensis	Proa		AR-1/19	Museo Aragonés de Paleontología	Lower Albian	Escucha Formation	Spain		
Probactrosaurus gobiensis	Probactrosaurus		PIN 2232/1	Paleontological Institute, Russian Academy of Sciences	Barremian-Albian		China		
Probrachylophosaurus bergei	Probrachylophosaurus		MOR 2919	Museum of the Rockies	Campanian(78.5-78.2 Ma)	Judith River Formation	United States		Reconstructed holotype skull of Probrachylophosaurus bergei
Proplanicoxa galtoni	Proplanicoxa		NHMUK R8649	Natural History Museum, London	Early Cretaceous		United Kingdom	Nomen dubium, likely referrable to Mantellisaurus atherfieldensis	
Prosaurolophus maximus	Prosaurolophus		AMNH 5386	American Museum of Natural History	Campanian	Dinosaur Park Formation	Canada		Holotype skull of Prosaurolophus maximus
Protohadros byrdi	Protohadros		SMU 74582	Shuler Museum of Paleontology	Mid-Cenomanian	Woodbine Formation	United States		
Pteropelyx grallipes	Pteropelyx		AMNH 3791	American Museum of Natural History				Bones indistinguishable from Corythosaurus	
Qantassaurus intrepidus	Qantassaurus		NMV P199075	Museums Victoria	Upper Barremian	Wonthaggi Formation	Australia		Holotype dentary of Qantassaurus intrepidus
Ratchasimasaurus suranareae	Ratchasimasaurus		NRRU-A2064	Northeastern Research Institute of Petrified Wood and Mineral Resources, Nakhon Ratchasima Rajabhat University	Aptian	Khok Kruat Formation	Thailand		
Rhabdodon priscus	Rhabdodon		MPLM 30 (lectotype), MPLM 31, 32, 34, 36, 51, 59, 60, 61 (paralectotypes)	Palais Longchamp Museum	Early Maastrichtian	Rognacian Formation	France		Lectotype (A–E) and paralectotype (F–G) dentaries of Rhabdodon priscus
Rhinorex condrupus	Rhinorex		BYU 13258	Brigham Young University Museum of Paleontology	Campanian	Neslen Formation	United States		
Riabininohadros weberae	Riabininohadros		ZGTM 5751	Chernyshev Central Research Museum of Geology and Exploration	Upper Maastrichtian		Crimea		
Sahaliyania elunchunorum	Sahaliyania		GMH W453	Geological Museum of Heilongjiang	Maastrichtian	Yuliangze Formation	China		
Saurolophus angustirostris	Saurolophus		PIN 551/8	Paleontological Institute, Russian Academy of Sciences	Upper Campanian-Lower Maastrichtian	Nemegt Formation	Mongolia		
Saurolophus osborni	Saurolophus		AMNH 5220	American Museum of Natural History	Early Maastrichtian	Horseshoe Canyon Formation	Canada		Skull of the holotype of Saurolophus and Saurolophus osborni
Secernosaurus koerneri	Secernosaurus		FMNH P13423	Field Museum of Natural History	Late Campanian-Early Maastrichtian	Bajo Barreal Formation	Argentina		
Sektensaurus sanjuanboscoi	Sektensaurus		UNPSJB-PV 1054	National University of Patagonia San Juan Bosco	Coniacian-Maastrichtian	Lago Colhué Huapi Formation	Argentina		
Sellacoxa pauli	Sellacoxa		BMNH R 3788	Natural History Museum, London	Lower Valanginian	Lower Wadhurst Clay Formation	United Kingdom		
Shantungosaurus giganteus	Shantungosaurus		GMV 1780-1	Geological Museum of China	Middle-Late Campanian	Wangshi Group	China		
Shuangmiaosaurus gilmorei	Shuangmiaosaurus		LPM 0165	Liaoning Paleontological Museum	Mid-Cretaceous	Sunjiawan Formation	China		
Siamodon nimngami	Siamodon		PRC-4	Paleontological Research and Education Centre, Mahasarakham University	Aptian	Khok Kruat Formation	Thailand		
Siluosaurus zhanggiani	Siluosaurus		IVPP V.11117 (1-2)	Institute of Vertebrate Paleontology and Paleoanthropology	Early Cretaceous	Gongpoquan Basin	China	Nomen dubium	
Sirindhorna khoratensis	Sirindhorna		NRRU3001-166	Northeastern Research Institute of Petrified Wood and Mineral Resources, Nakhon Ratchasima Rajabhat University	Aptian	Khok Kruat Formation	Thailand		
Syngonosaurus macrocercus	Syngonosaurus		CAMSM B55570-78, B55580-86	Sedgwick Museum of Earth Sciences	Upper Albian	Gault Formation	United Kingdom		
Talenkauen santacrucensis	Talenkauen		MPM-10001	Museo Padre Molina	Maastrichtian	Pari Aike Formation	Argentina		
Tanius sinensis	Tanius		PMU 24720	Museum of Evolution of Uppsala University	Upper Campanian-Lower Maastrichtian	Jiangjunding Formation	China		
Telmatosaurus transsylvanicus	Telmatosaurus		BMNH R.3386	Natural History Museum, London	Upper Maastrictian	Sânpetru Formation	Romania		Lectotype skull of Telmatosaurus transsylvanicus
Tenontosaurus dossi	Tenontosaurus		FWMSH 93B1	Fort Worth Museum of Science and History	Early Cretaceous	Twin Mountains Formation	United States		
Tenontosaurus tilletti	Tenontosaurus		AMNH 3040	American Museum of Natural History	Aptian-Albian	Cloverly Formation	United States		
Tethyshadros insularis	Tethyshadros		SC 57021	Italian State Collections	Late Campanian-Early Maastrichtian	Liburnian Formation	Italy		The holotype skeleton of Tethyshadros insularis
Theiophytalia kerri	Theiophytalia		YPM 1887	Peabody Museum of Natural History	Lower Cretaceous	Purgatoire Formation	United States		Holotype skull of Theiophytalia kerri
Thespesius occidentalis	Thespesius		USNM 219, 220, 221	National Museum of Natural History	Late Cretaceous	Lance Formation	United States	Nomen dubium	The syntype vertebrae of Thespesius occidentalis
Tlatolophus galorum	Tlatolophus		CIC/P/147	Colección Paleontológica del Centro INAH	Upper Campanian	Cerro del Pueblo Formation	Mexico		
Trachodon mirabilis	Trachodon		ANSP 9260	Academy of Natural Sciences of Philadelphia	Late Cretaceous	Judith River Formation	United States	Nomen dubium	The holotype teeth of Trachodon
Transylvanosaurus platycephalus	Transylvanosaurus		LPB (FGGUB) R.2070	University of Tübingen	Maastrichtian	Pui Beds	Romania		
Trinisaura santamartaensis	Trinisaura		MLP08-III-1-1	Museo de La Plata	Upper Campanian	Snow Hill Island Formation	Antarctica		Skeletal diagram of Trinisaura santamartaensis showing the holotype elements
Tsintaosaurus spinorhinus	Tsintaosaurus		IVPP V 725	Institute of Vertebrate Paleontology and Paleoanthropology	Late Campanian-Early Maastrichtian	Jingangkou Formation	China		The holotype skull of Tsintaosaurus spinorhinus
Ugrunaaluk kuukpikensis	Ugrunaaluk		UAMES 12995	University of Alaska Museum	Lower Maastrichtian	Prince Creek Formation	United States		
Uteodon aphanoecetes	Uteodon		CM 11337	Carnegie Museum of Natural History	Lower-Middle Tithonian	Brushy Basin Member, Morrison Formation	United States		
Valdosaurus canaliculatus	Valdosaurus		BMNH R185, R186	Natural History Museum, London	Barremian	Wealden Group	United Kingdom		
Velafrons coahuilensis	Velafrons		CPC-59	Paleontological Collection of Coahuila	Late Campanian	Cerro del Pueblo Formation	Mexico		
Weewarrasaurus pobeni	Weewarrasaurus		LRF 3067	Australian Opal Centre	Early Cenomanian	Wallangulla Sandstone, Griman Creek Formation	Australia		Holotype dentary of Weewarrasaurus pobeni
Willinakaqe salitralensis	Willinakaqe		MPCA-Pv SM 8	Museo Provincial Carlos Ameghino	Late Cretaceous	Allen Formation	Argentina	Nomen vanum	
Wulagasaurus dongi	Wulagasaurus		GMH W184	Geological Museum of Heilongjiang	Maastrichtian	Yuliangze Formation	China		Holotype dentary of Wulagasaurus dongi
Xuwulong yueluni	Xuwulong		GSGM F00001	Gansu Geological Museum	Aptian-Albian	Xinminpu Group	China		
Yamatosaurus izanagii	Yamatosaurus		MNHAH D1-033516	Museum of Nature and Human Activities	Early Maastrictian (71.94-71.69 Ma)	Kita-ama Formation	Japan		Holotype dentary of Yamatosaurus izanagii
Yueosaurus tiantaiensis	Yueosaurus		ZMNH M8620	Zhejiang Museum of Natural History	Albian-Cenomanian	Liangtoutang Formation	China		
Yunganglong datongensis	Yunganglong		SXMG V 00001	Shanxi Museum of Geology	Upper Cretaceous	Zhumapu Formation	China		Holotype vertebrae of Yunganglong datongensis
Zalmoxes robustus	Zalmoxes		BMNH R.3392	Natural History Museum, London	Upper Maastrichtian	Sânpetru Formation	Romania		
Zalmoxes shqiperorum	Zalmoxes		BMNH R.4900	Natural History Museum, London	Upper Maastrichtian		Romania		
Zhanghenglong yangchengensis	Zhanghenglong		XMDFEC V0013	XIxia Museum of Dinosaur Fossil Eggs of China	Middle Santonian	Majiacun Formation	China		Holotype maxilla of Zhanghenglong yangchengensis
Zuoyunlong huangi	Zuoyunlong		SXMG V 00004	Shanxi Museum of Geology	Cenomanian?	Zhumapu Formation	China		

== See also ==
- List of marginocephalian type specimens
- List of thyreophoran type specimens
- List of other ornithischian type specimens
- List of non-avian theropod type specimens
- List of sauropodomorph type specimens
- List of Mesozoic birds
