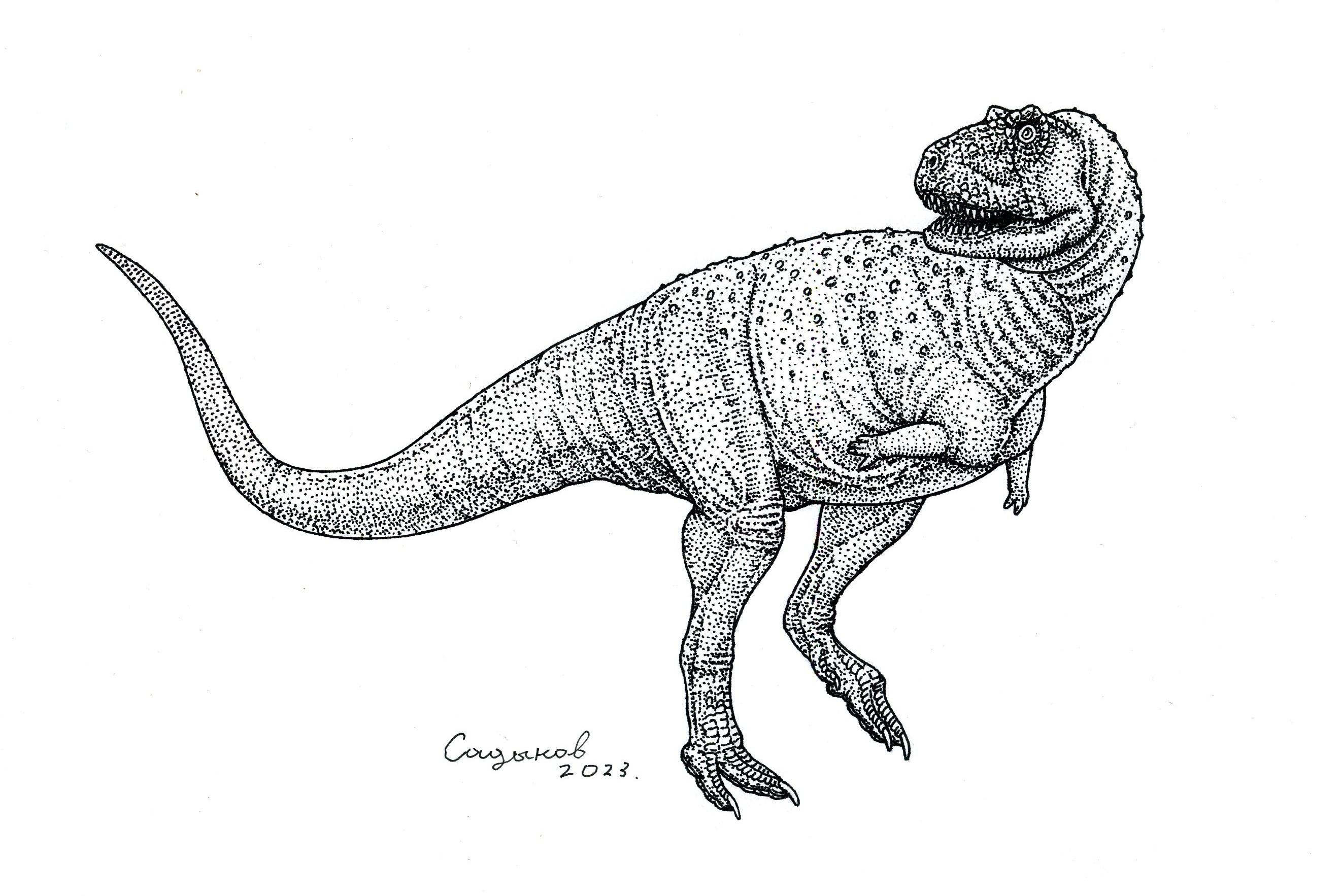
- Speculative life restoration

Scientific classification
- Kingdom: Animalia
- Phylum: Chordata
- Class: Reptilia
- Clade: Dinosauria
- Clade: Saurischia
- Clade: Theropoda
- Family: †Abelisauridae
- Clade: †Brachyrostra
- Genus: †Niebla; Rolando et al., 2020
- Species: †N. antiqua

Binomial name
- †Niebla antiqua Rolando et al., 2020

= Niebla antiqua =

Niebla antiqua Temporal range: Late Cretaceous, Maastrichtian

Species of abelisaurid theropod dinosaur

Niebla antiqua is an extinct species of abelisaurid theropod dinosaurs from the Late Cretaceous (Maastrichtian) of Río Negro province, Argentina. Niebla antiqua is the only species in the genus Niebla, known from a partial, non-articulated skeleton. The holotype, found in the Allen Formation, represents an adult individual about nine years old in minimum age.

== Discovery and naming ==
The holotype, MPCN-PV-796, was found near Matadero Hill, 70 kilometres (43 mi) south of General Roca, Río Negro Province, Argentina. The fossil material includes a near-complete braincase, fragmentary jaw and teeth, relatively complete scapulocoracoid, dorsal ribs and incomplete vertebrae.

The genus name Niebla comes from the Spanish word for "mist", referring to the foggy days during the excavation of the fossil. The specific name, antiqua, is derived from a Latin word meaning "old."

== Description ==
Niebla represents one of the most derived abelisaurids. Despite its relatively small size, especially when compared to related dinosaurs like Carnotaurus, the holotype represents an adult. Based on the remains, Niebla would have been roughly 4–4.5 metres (13–15 ft) long.

The scapulocoracoid is notably similar to that of Carnotaurus in having a posterodorsally oriented glenoid, a dorsoventrally expanded and wide coraco-scapular plate, and a very narrow and straight scapular blade. These features are very different from those of other abelisaurids, which may indicate a unique conformation of the pectoral girdle among these South American theropods.

== Paleoecology ==
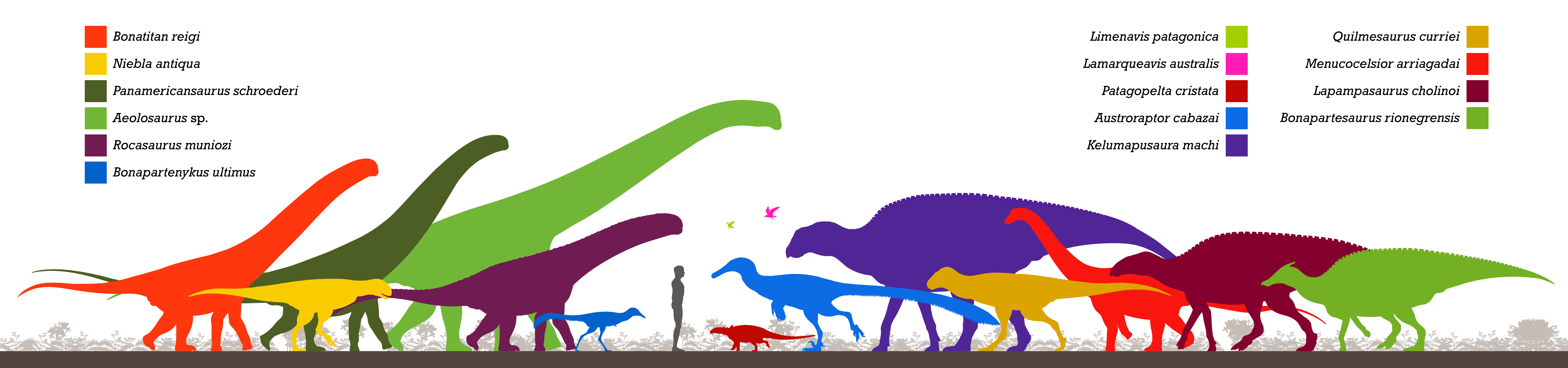
Niebla and other dinosaur fauna from the Allen Formation (Niebla in yellow, second from left)

Niebla is known from the Allen Formation of Argentina. The pterosaur Aerotitan, as well as many theropods (Quilmesaurus, Bonapartenykus, Austroraptor), sauropods (Bonatitan, Aeolosaurus, Menucocelsior, Panamericansaurus, Pellegrinisaurus, Rocasaurus), the ankylosaur Patagopelta, and ornithopods (Lapampasaurus, Kelumapusaura, Willinakaqe, and Bonapartesaurus), are also known from the formation.
