= Angolabatis =

Angolabatis Temporal range: Campanian– Maastrichtian

Scientific classification
- Domain: Eukaryota
- Kingdom: Animalia
- Phylum: Chordata
- Class: Chondrichthyes
- Subclass: Elasmobranchii
- Order: Rajiformes
- Family: †Hypsobatidae
- Genus: †Angolabatis; Cappetta, 2006

Genus of Cretaceous ray

Angolabatis is an extinct genus of skate from the Late Cretaceous of the Cretaceous. It is represented by a single described species, A. benguelaensis. It was described from isolated teeth found in the late Campanian to early Maastrichtian rocks of Quimbala, a site in the Benguela Basin of Angola. These teeth were originally placed under the genus Angolaia; however, this name was preoccupied by a living genus of leafhopper. Teeth attributed to this genus have been described from the contemporary Allen Formation of the Cerro Tortuga locality in the Santa Rosa Basin of the Río Negro province, Argentina. The Argentinian specimens likely represent a new species, but the fragmentary nature of the finds precludes a formal description of a new taxon. While A. benguelaensis was found in marine deposits, the Argentinian species was found among freshwater fish.
