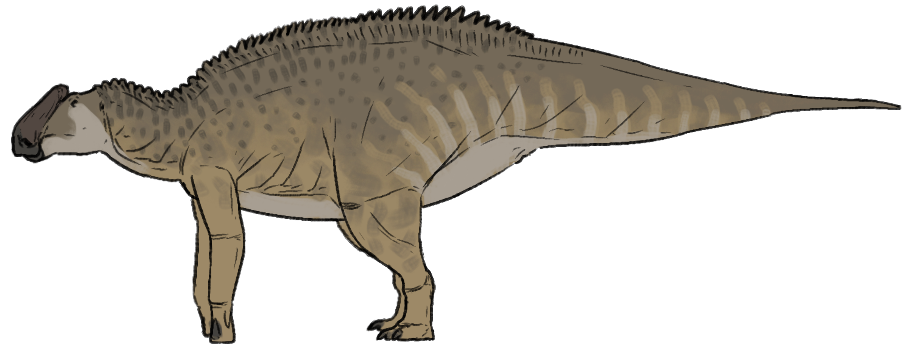
- Life restoration

Scientific classification
- Kingdom: Animalia
- Phylum: Chordata
- Class: Reptilia
- Clade: Dinosauria
- Clade: †Ornithischia
- Clade: †Ornithopoda
- Family: †Hadrosauridae
- Subfamily: †Saurolophinae
- Clade: †Austrokritosauria
- Genus: †Bonapartesaurus; Cruzado-Caballero & Powell 2017

Type species
- †Bonapartesaurus rionegrensis Cruzado-Caballero & Powell 2017

= Bonapartesaurus =

Bonapartesaurus Temporal range: Campanian-Maastrichtian ~73–66 Ma

Extinct genus of dinosaurs

Bonapartesaurus (meaning "Bonaparte's lizard", named after José Bonaparte) is an extinct genus of herbivorous ornithopod dinosaur belonging to Hadrosauridae, which lived in the area of modern Argentina during the Campanian and Maastrichtian stages of the Late Cretaceous.

== Discovery and naming ==
The remains were excavated by the Argentine paleontologist Jaime Powell and collaborators in 1984 and described by him in 1987, where he identified the dinosaur remains as a possible "indeterminate lambeosaurine", comparing it mainly with the genera Hypacrosaurus and Barsboldia due to great size of the neural spines.

In 2010, Rubén D. Juárez Valieri and his team erected a new genus and hadrosaurid species called Willinakaqe salitralensis from different materials found in 2 different locations (Salitral Moreno and Islas Malvinas) of the Allen Formation, which are mostly housed in the collection of the Carlos Ameghino Provincial Museum, where the specimen was examined by Powell, and was made the paratype of this new genus, in addition to the holotype of Lapampasaurus as material attributed to W. salitralensis from the second locality and housed in the Provincial Museum of Natural History, in the province of La Pampa.

Later, the Spanish paleontologist Penélope Cruz-Caballero and the Argentine Rodolfo Coria reviewed the material attributed to the genus Willinakaqe in 2016, where they concluded that fossils may represent more than one taxon of hadrosaurid and that the characteristics used in the diagnosis would not be valid. Also, the specimen is not preserved in good condition in addition to being incomplete, and therefore non-diagnostic, degrading it to the status of an indeterminate saurolophine and making Willinakaqe salitrensis a nomen vanum.

In a 2017 study, Cruzado-Caballero and Powell (who died before the paper was published) reassigned the paratype of W. salitralensis to its own genus and species, Bonapartesaurus rionegrensis, converting the former into a chimera of different hadrosaurids, and hence, an invalid name.

== Description ==
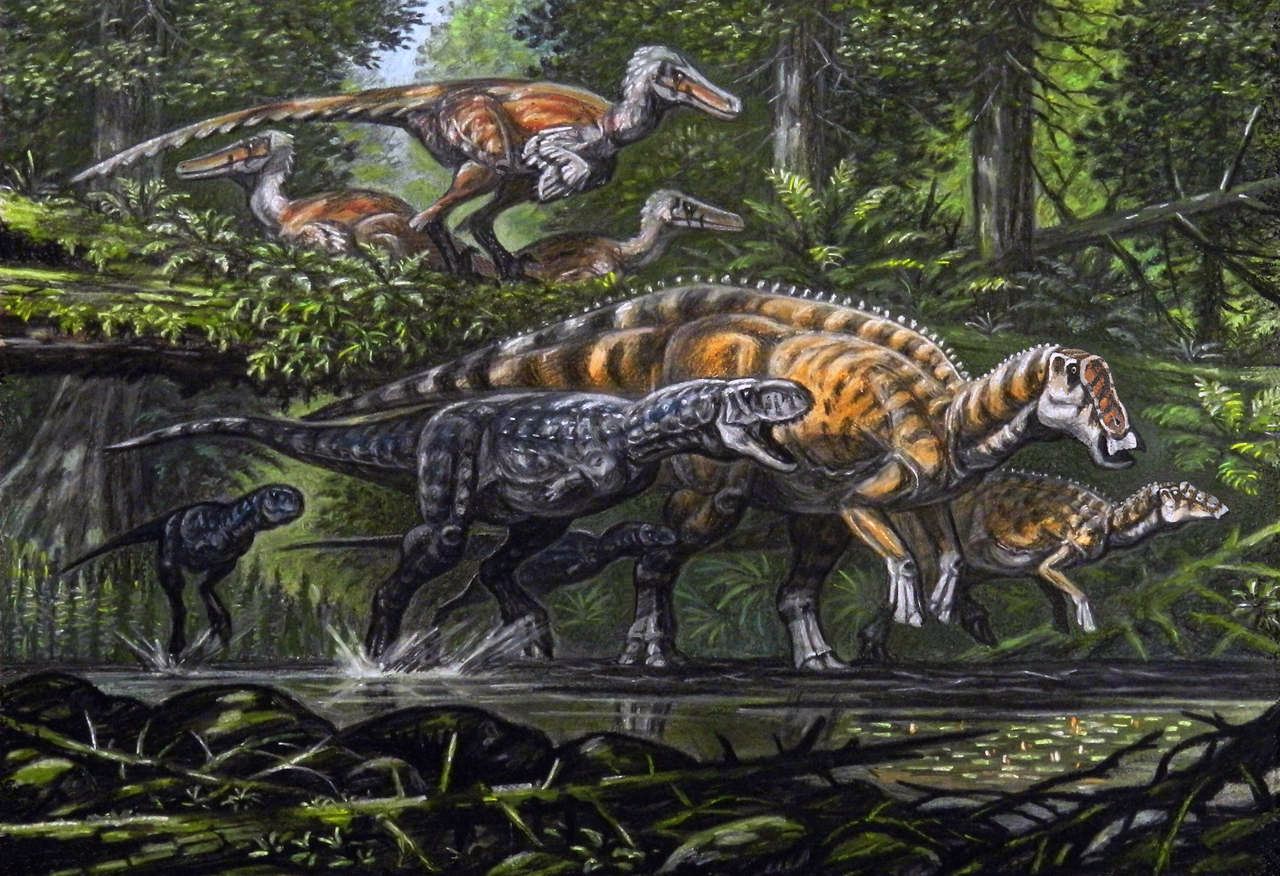
Quilmesaurus chasing Bonapartesaurus, while an Austroraptor group watches

The holotype specimen MPCA-Pv SM2/1-71, consists of a partial skeleton including 4 dorsal vertebrae, a complete sacrum, 8 anterior caudal vertebrae, 9 medial caudal vertebrae, 2 blocks with 5 medial caudal vertebrae each, 18 haemal arches, 3 dorsal ribs, a distal fragment of the right scapula, a distal fragment of the left humerus, a left ulna, a right ilium, a nearly complete left pubis, distal fragments of both ischia, both femurs, tibias, and fibulae, a left astragalus, a right calcaneus, an almost complete articulated left foot and two blocks with tendons. All the material present was extracted from the Salitral Moreno site of the Río Negro province in southern Argentina, from the lower member of the Allen Formation, which dates to the Late Cretaceous (Campanian to Maastrichtian).

Bonapartesaurus is characterized by the following combination of unique characters: the proportion between the height of the neural, sacral and centrum spines is greater than 3.5; the neural spines of the anterior part of the caudal vertebrae are extremely long (between three and a half and four times the height of the centrum) and evenly the distal expansion; a pre-acetabular process slightly flexed ventrally, with the angle greater than 150°; the proportion between the maximum dorsoventral depth of the posterior end of the dorsoventral preacetabular process and the distance from the pubic peduncle to the dorsal margin of the iliac bone is inferior to 0,50; The ratio between height and anteroposterior dorsoventral length of the iliac lamina is 0.8 or higher; an asymmetric lateral profile of the supraacetabular process; the posterior portion of the mediolateral postacetabular process markedly thicker as a result of the dorsomedial torsion of the postacetabular process; an expanded cnemial crest limited anteriorly to the proximal end of the tibia; and the articular surface of the astragalus for the internal malleolus of the tibia is moderately expanded medially, articulating with only a part of the ventral surface of the tibial internal malleolus.

== Paleopathologies ==
In 2021, Cruzado-Caballero and colleagues used CT scans to identify three palaeopathologies present on the bones of the Bonapartesaurus holotype. These were located on two caudal vertebrae and the left metatarsal II bone. The two caudal vertebrae had suffered fractures of the spinous processes. In the first one, the injury was caused by impact and demonstrated post-traumatic infection. The cause of the pathology on the other vertebra is unknown. There was a tumour in the metatarsal bone which was probably a malignant bone tumour such as osteosarcoma. These pathologies likely caused pain and hampered the animal's normal functioning, but were not the direct cause of its death.

== Phylogeny ==
The first phylogenetic analysis of Bonapartesaurus followed Paul Sereno's definition for Hadrosauridae from 1998, in addition to using the traditional classification of Hadrosaurinae (prior to the consensus of Prieto-Marquez in 2010), which includes all non-crested hadrosaurids along with the fragmentary genus Hadrosaurus within the same subfamily. It is also placed within the Saurolophini tribe, being more derived than Prosaurolophus, but more basal than Saurolophus spp., in contrast to the tentative classification of Willinakaqe within the Kritosaurini tribe. The following cladogram is based on the phylogenetic analysis of Cruzado-Caballero & Powell in 2017, with the relationships with Lambeosaurinae and Hadrosauroidea not shown:

- Hadrosaurinae / Saurolophinae
  - - Hadrosaurus foulkii
    - Wulagasaurus dongi
    - Acristavus gagslarsoni
    - - Maiasaura peeblesorum
      - Brachylophosaurus canadensis
  - - - Kritosaurus navajovius
      - - Gryposaurus notabilis
        - Gryposaurus monumentensis
        - Gryposaurus incurvimanus
        - Gryposaurus latidens
    - - - Kerberosaurus manakini
        - - Shantungosaurus giganteus
          - - Edmontosaurus regalis
            - - Edmontosaurus saskatchewanensis
              - Edmontosaurus annectens
      - - - Lophorhothon atopus
          - - Prosaurolophus maximus
            - - Bonapartesaurus rionegrensis
              - - Saurolophus osborni
                - Saurolophus angustirostris

In the 2023 description of the South American hadrosauroid Gonkoken, Alarcón-Muñoz et al. recovered Bonapartesaurus as a member of the Austrokritosauria, a clade of entirely South American saurolophines closely related to kritosaurins. The results of their phylogenetic analyses of Saurolophinae are displayed in the cladogram below:

- Saurolophinae
  - - - Wulagasaurus
      - Acristavus
    - - Maiasaura
      - - Probrachylophosaurus
        - Brachylophosaurus
  - - - Austrokritosauria
        - Secernosaurus
        - - Bonapartesaurus
          - - Kelumapusaura
            - Huallasaurus
      - Kritosaurini
        - Kritosaurus
        - - - Rhinorex
            - Gryposaurus latidens
          - - Gryposaurus notabilis
            - Gryposaurus monumentensis
    - - Kamuysaurus
      - - - Prosaurolophus
          - - Saurolophus osborni
            - Saurolophus angustirostris
        - - - Laiyangosaurus
            - Kerberosaurus
          - - Shantungosaurus
            - - Edmontosaurus regalis
              - Edmontosaurus annectens

== See also ==
- Timeline of hadrosaur research
- 2017 in archosaur paleontology
