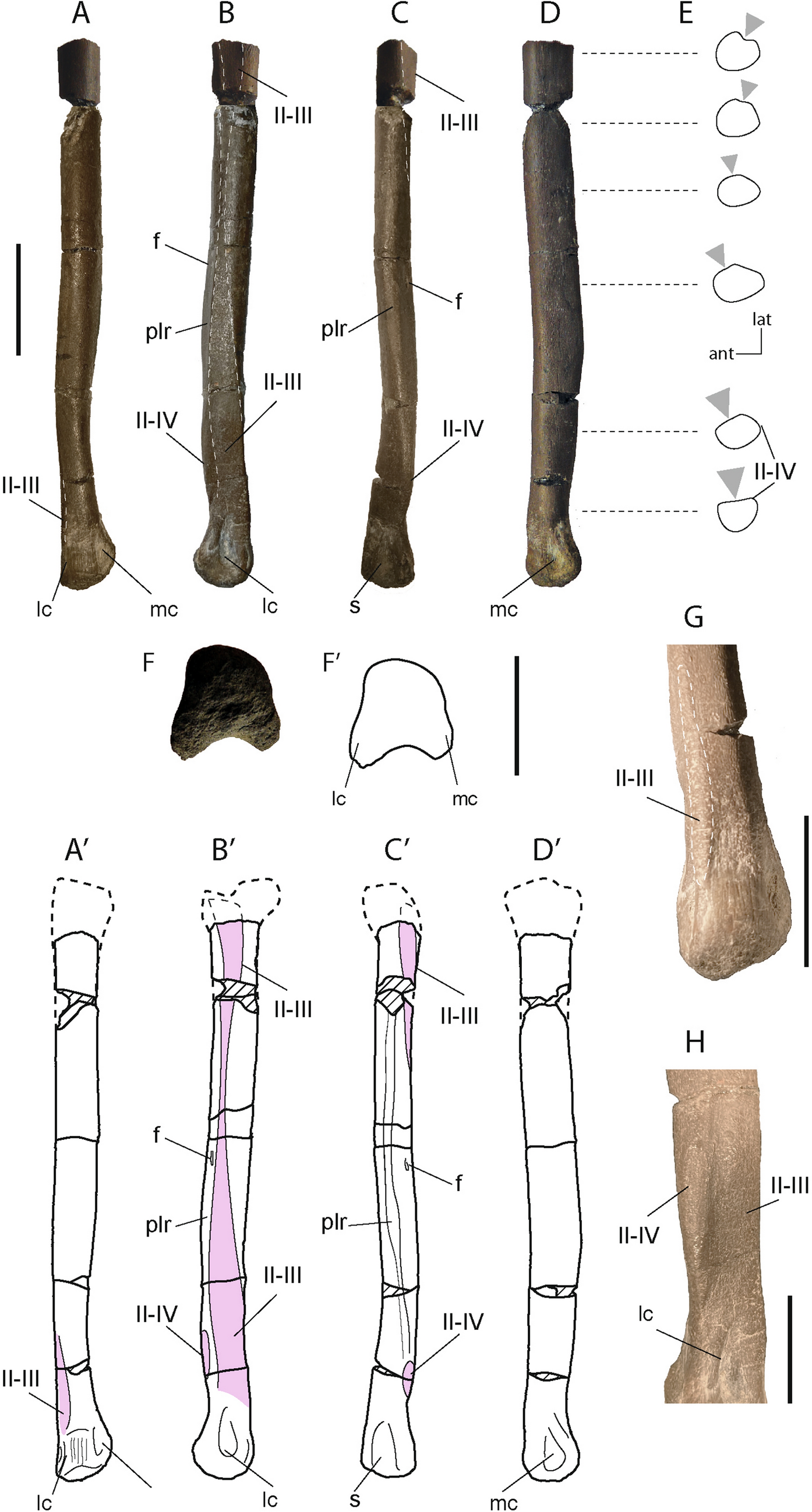
- Holotype metatarsal MCD-7073

Scientific classification
- Domain: Eukaryota
- Kingdom: Animalia
- Phylum: Chordata
- Clade: Dinosauria
- Clade: Saurischia
- Clade: Theropoda
- Family: †Troodontidae
- Subfamily: †Jinfengopteryginae
- Genus: †Tamarro; Sellés et al., 2021
- Species: †T. insperatus

Binomial name
- †Tamarro insperatus Sellés et al., 2021

= Tamarro =

Tamarro Temporal range: Late Cretaceous, 66.1–66 Ma

Genus of troodontid dinosaur from the Late Cretaceous period

Tamarro (named after a mythological creature in local culture) is a genus of troodontid theropod from the Late Cretaceous Talarn Formation (Tremp Group) of Spain. The genus contains a single species, Tamarro insperatus, known from a partial metatarsal described in 2021.

== Discovery and naming ==
The holotype of Tamarro, MCD-7073, a metatarsal, was found in 2003 at the Sant Romà d'Abella site, belonging to the Talarn Formation of the Tremp Group. In 2021, Sellés et al. described it as a new genus and species, Tamarro insperatus; the generic name is that of a small creature in the folklore of Pallars, Spain, while the specific name means "unexpected", referring to the unexpected discovery of the fossil.

== Classification ==
Sellés et al. placed Tamarro in the Jinfengopteryginae, making it the first member of the subfamily from Europe. They also suggested that its ancestors migrated from Asia to Europe sometime between the Cenomanian and the Maastrichtian.

- Troodontidae
  - Geminiraptor
  - Hesperornithoides
  - - - Sinovenatorinae
      - Jinfengopteryginae
        - Jinfengopteryx
        - - Liaoningvenator
          - - Philovenator
            - - IGM 100/1128
              - IGM 100/140
              - Tamarro
    - - IGM 100/44
      - - - - Xixiasaurus
            - Sinusonasus
          - - Tochisaurus
            - Daliansaurus
        - - Gobivenator
          - Troodontinae

== Paleobiology ==
Analysis of the holotype suggests it was a subadult; its large size suggests it grew quickly early in its life.

== Paleoecology ==
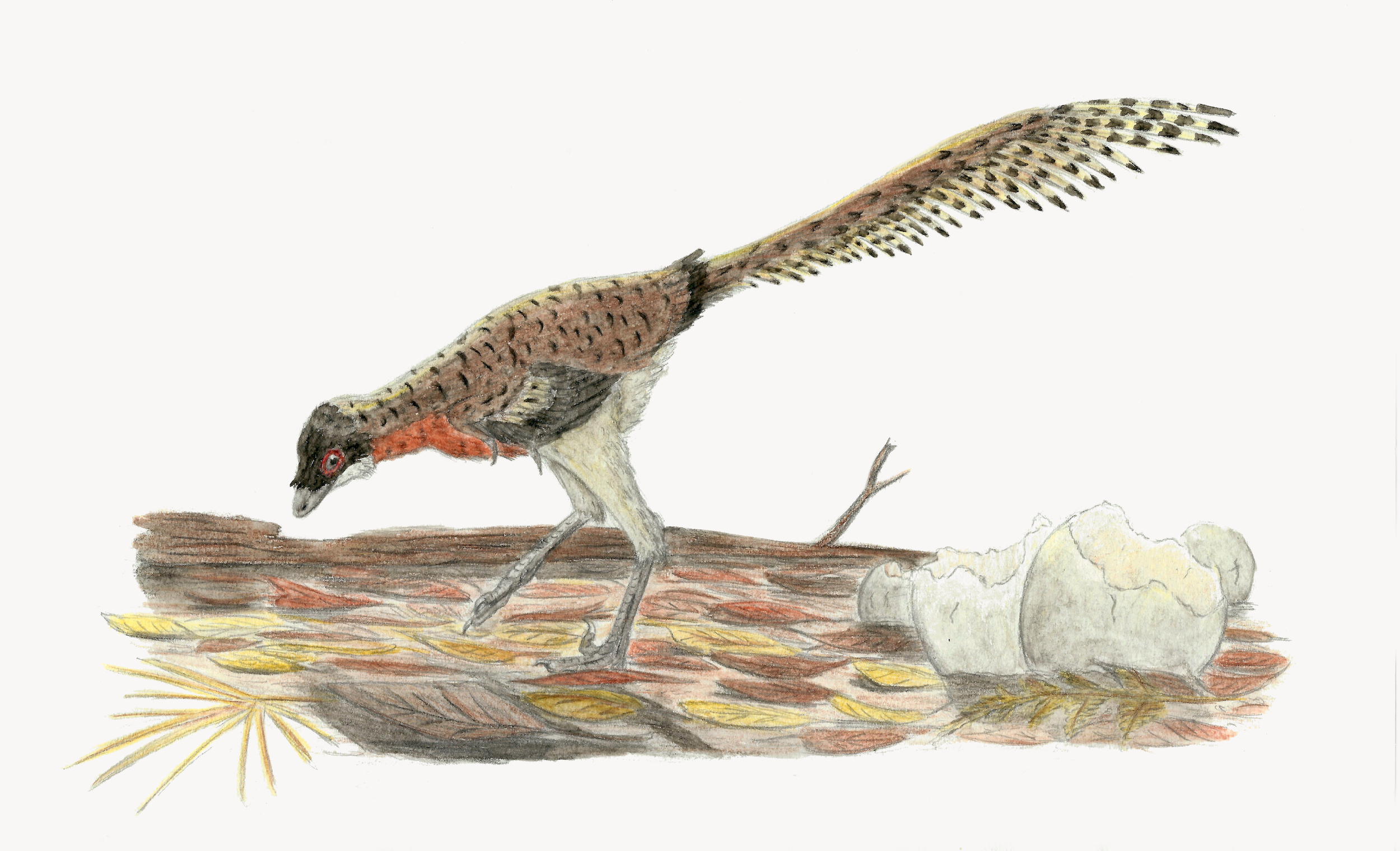
Hypothetical reconstruction of Tamarro insperatus based on related genera

Tamarro lived on the Ibero-Armorican Island, and its discovery increases knowledge about the diversity of small theropods on the Cretaceous European archipelago. It would have lived at the same time as dwarf sauropods and lambeosaurine hadrosaurs. The holotype of Calvarius, a styracosternan ornithopod, has also been named from the Talarn Formation.
