= Paleoteius =

Paleoteius Temporal range: Late Cretaceous, Maastrichtian

Scientific classification
- Kingdom: Animalia
- Phylum: Chordata
- Class: Reptilia
- Order: Squamata
- Infraorder: Scincomorpha (?)
- Genus: †Paleoteius; Agnolín et al., 2026
- Species: †P. lakui

Binomial name
- †Paleoteius lakui Agnolín et al., 2026

Genus of fossil lizards

Paleoteius is an extinct genus of lizard from the Late Cretaceous (Maastrichtian age) Allen Formation of Argentina. The genus contains a single species, Paleoteius lakui, known from a partial skull and fragments of the postcranial skeleton. It has apparent affinities to the clade Scincomorpha, and potentially the family Xantusiidae, although its exact relationships differ based on the phylogenetic methodology used. Paleoteius is the most complete fossil terrestrial lizard known from the Late Cretaceous of South America.

== Discovery and naming ==
Paleoteius type locality in Río Negro Province, Argentina

The Paleoteius fossil material was discovered at the 'Bonapartenykus site' on Arriagada Farm, representing fluvial sandstone outcrops of the Allen Formation, 70 kilometres (43 mi) south of the city of General Roca in Río Negro Province, Argentina. The specimen is housed in the Museo Patagónico de Ciencias Naturales in General Roca, where it is permanently accessioned as specimen MPCN-PV-1183. The specimen consists of a partial skull and skeleton belonging to a single individual. The cranial material includes the left maxillae, frontal, parietal, part of the jugal, parts of the quadrate, the right prefrontal, and various unidentified fragments. The identified postcranial remains include three complete, articulated trunk vertebrae and an isolated presacral vertebral centrum, the bottom part of the left humerus, the top parts of both femora, and other fragments.

In 2026, Federico L. Agnolín and colleagues described Paleoteius lakui as a new genus and species of lizard based on these fossil remains, establishing MPCN-PV-1183 as the holotype specimen. The generic name, Paleoteius, combines the Ancient Greek word παλαιός (palaiós), meaning 'old', with 'teius', derived from the Tupi–Guarani word teyú, the most common native term for squamates in that region. The specific name, lakui, is derived from the Mapudungun word laku, meaning 'grandfather'.
