= Osmakasaurus =

Osmakasaurus Temporal range: Valanginian, 137 Ma

Scientific classification
- Kingdom: Animalia
- Phylum: Chordata
- Class: Reptilia
- Clade: Dinosauria
- Clade: †Ornithischia
- Clade: †Ornithopoda
- Clade: †Ankylopollexia
- Clade: †Styracosterna
- Genus: †Osmakasaurus; McDonald, 2011
- Species: †O. depressus

Binomial name
- †Osmakasaurus depressus (Gilmore, 1909)

Synonyms
- Camptosaurus depressus Gilmore, 1909; Planicoxa depressa Carpenter & Wilson, 2008

Extinct genus of dinosaurs

Osmakasaurus (meaning "canyon lizard", ósmaka meaning "canyon" in the Lakota language) is a genus of iguanodontian dinosaur which lived in the Early Cretaceous (Valanginian age) Chilson Member of the Lakota Formation in what is now Buffalo Gap of South Dakota, United States. This genus was named by Andrew T. McDonald in 2011 and the type species is O. depressus.

== Discovery and naming ==
The holotype, USNM 4753, was discovered by Nelson Horatio Darton in 1896 within a layer of the Lakota Formation. The type species O. depressus was previously referred to as Camptosaurus depressus, and was first described in 1909 by Charles W. Gilmore. It was assigned to the genus Planicoxa as Planicoxa depressa in 2008. In 2011, it was assigned to the new genus Osmakasaurus.
