= Siluosaurus =

Siluosaurus Temporal range: Early Cretaceous, 130–112 Ma

Scientific classification
- Kingdom: Animalia
- Phylum: Chordata
- Class: Reptilia
- Clade: Dinosauria
- Clade: †Ornithischia
- Genus: †Siluosaurus; Dong, 1997
- Species: †S. zhanggiani

Binomial name
- †Siluosaurus zhanggiani Dong, 1997

Extinct genus of dinosaurs

Siluosaurus (meaning "Silu (Chinese for Silk Road, referring to the discovery location) lizard") is a genus of ornithischian dinosaur from the Early Cretaceous (Barremian-Albian) Xinminbao Group of Gansu, China. It is based on the specimen IVPP V.11117 (1-2), which consists of two teeth. It is an obscure genus, with no papers doing more than mentioning it since it was described in 1997. The type species is S. zhanggiani.

== History ==
The holotype teeth of Siluosaurus were recovered during the 1992 Sino-Japanese Silk Road Dinosaur Expedition in the lower portion of the Xinminbao Group. One tooth, seven millimetres long, was from the upper beak (premaxilla), and the other, 3.7 millimetres high, was from the cheek region of the upper jaw (maxilla). Dong Zhiming, who named the genus in 1997, suggested that it was a hypsilophodontid, and described the teeth as the smallest ornithopod teeth yet known. The type species is Siluosaurus zhanggiani. The specific name honours Zhang Qian, the Chinese diplomat who reconnoitred the Silk Road in the second century B.C. It was regarded without comment as a dubious name in the most recent review of basal ornithopods, a not-uncommon fate for dinosaur names based on teeth. Fonseca et al. (2024) recovered this genus as an indeterminate member of Cerapoda in their supplementary material.

== Paleobiology ==
As a hypsilophodontid or other basal ornithopod, Siluosaurus would have been a bipedal herbivore. Its size has not been estimated, but as most adult hypsilophodonts were 1–2 meters (3.3–6.6 ft) long, this genus would have been of similar to smaller size, based on Dong's comments.
