= Calvarius =

Calvarius Temporal range: Late Cretaceous (Maastrichtian), 66.1–66 Ma

Scientific classification
- Kingdom: Animalia
- Phylum: Chordata
- Class: Reptilia
- Clade: Dinosauria
- Clade: †Ornithischia
- Clade: †Ornithopoda
- Clade: †Styracosterna
- Genus: †Calvarius; Prieto-Márquez & Sellés, 2023
- Species: †C. rapidus

Binomial name
- †Calvarius rapidus Prieto-Márquez & Sellés, 2023

Genus of ornithopod dinosaurs

Calvarius (meaning "suffering") is an extinct genus of styracosternan ornithopod from the Late Cretaceous (Maastrichtian age) Talarn Formation of Spain. The genus contains a single species, Calvarius rapidus, known from a single metatarsal. The slender morphology of this bone may indicate Calvarius had a cursorial (adapted to run) ecology, in contrast to its slower-moving relatives.

== Discovery and naming ==
The holotype specimen, MCD-8734, is a single fourth metatarsal discovered in 2019 in layers of the Talarn Formation ('Pallars Jussà' locality, Tremp Group) in Catalonia, Spain. In 2023, Albert Prieto-Márquez and Albert Sellés described Calvarius rapidus as a new genus of styracosternan dinosaurs based on this specimen. The genus name, "Calvarius", refers to the type locality, Serrat del Calvari. It is further derived from the Catalan calvari, meaning "suffering", referencing proximity of the genus to the K-Pg extinction event. The specific name, "rapidus", is a Latin word meaning "fast", referring to the likely cursorial habits inferred by the slender metatarsal anatomy.

== Description and classification ==
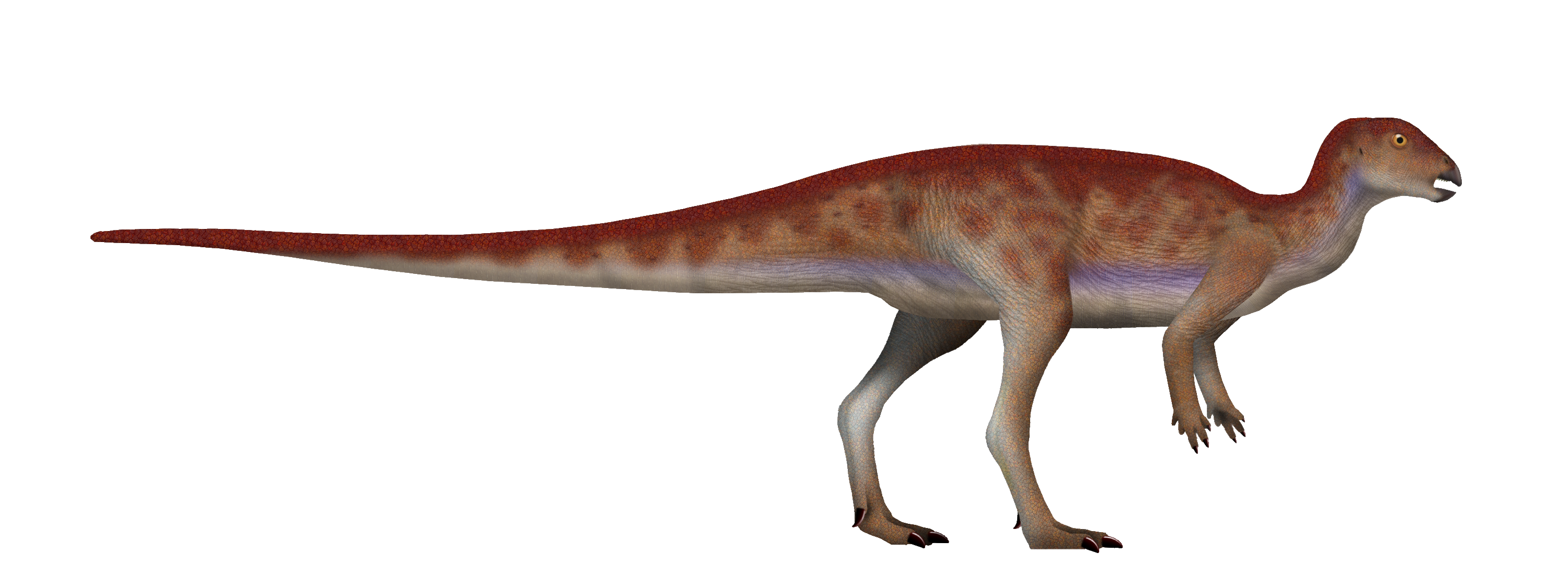
Life restoration of the bipedal Hypsilophodon, which Calvarius was convergently similar to

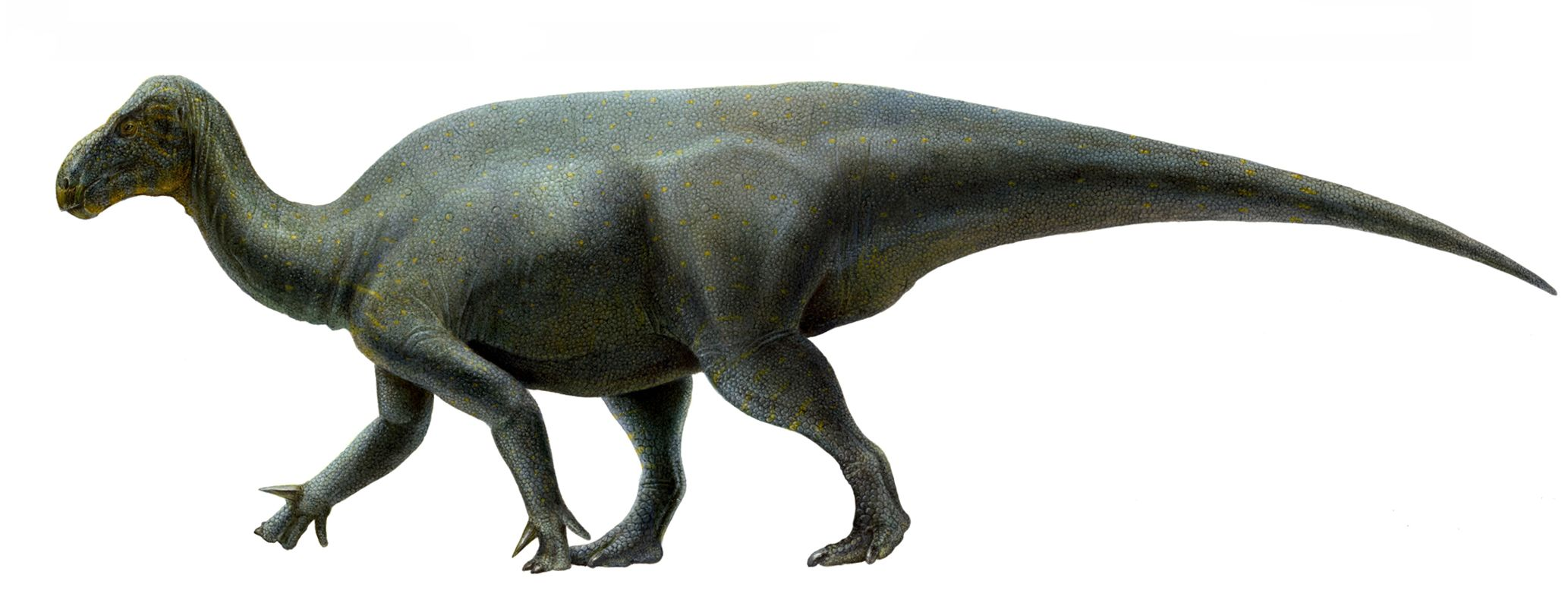
Life restoration of Iguanacolossus, a more typical quadrupedal styracosternan

The highly modified metatarsal of Calvarius is slender and elongated, with no equivalents among its close relatives. It is convergently similar to the corresponding gracile metatarsals of more basal bipedal ornithischians such as Hypsilophodon and Dysalotosaurus. However, various anatomical characteristics indicate Calvarius was a member of the typically quadrupedal Styracosterna. As such, it may have occupied the cursorial niche of the smaller, bipedal non-styracosternan ornithopods.

In their 2023 description of Calvarius, Prieto-Márquez & Sellés were unable to determine a precise phylogenetic position for this taxon via phylogenetic analyses, as these results recovered a large unresolved polytomy of styracosternans.

== Paleoenvironment ==
Calvarius is known from the Talarn Formation, which dates to the latest Maastrichtian age of the late Cretaceous period. At the end of the Cretaceous, much of Europe was an archipelago. The Talarn Formation outcrops represent part of this, deemed the 'Ibero-Armorican Island'. The putative troodontid Tamarro has also been named from the formation. Other European localities of similar age have yielded other dinosaurs including rhabdodontid ornithopods, various hadrosauroids, nodosaurid ankylosaurs, small titanosaur sauropods, and abelisauroid and maniraptoran theropods.
