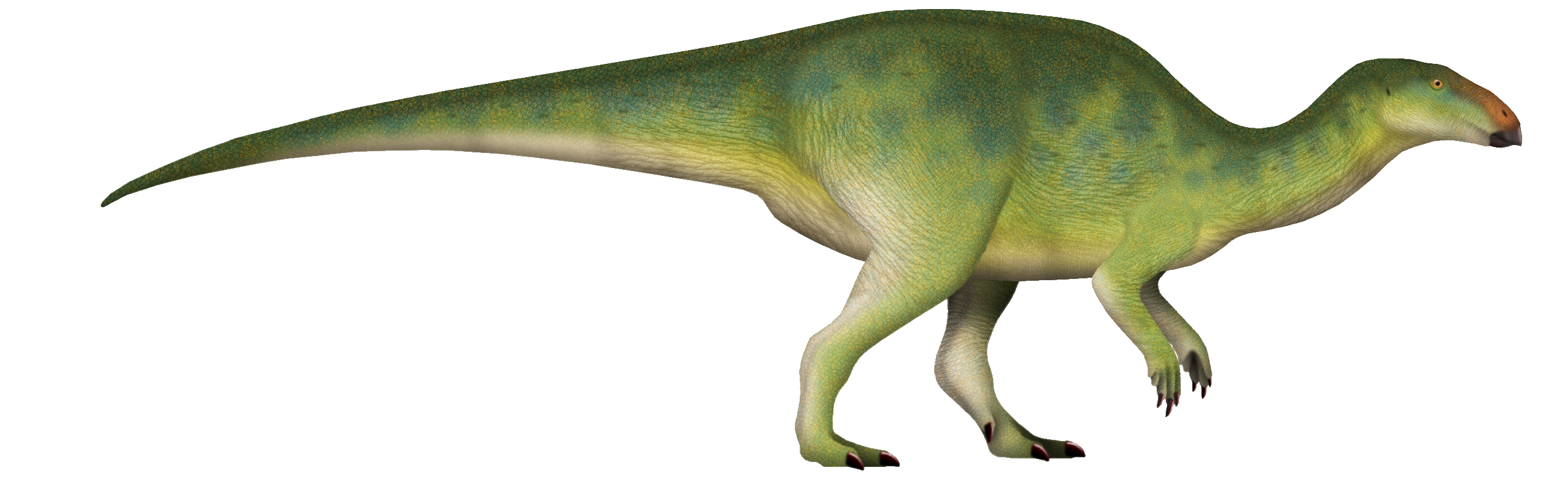
- Life restoration of Planicoxa

Scientific classification
- Kingdom: Animalia
- Phylum: Chordata
- Class: Reptilia
- Clade: Dinosauria
- Clade: †Ornithischia
- Clade: †Ornithopoda
- Clade: †Ankylopollexia
- Clade: †Styracosterna
- Genus: †Planicoxa; DiCroce & Carpenter, 2001
- Species: †P. venenica

Binomial name
- †Planicoxa venenica DiCroce & Carpenter, 2001

= Planicoxa =

Planicoxa Temporal range: Early Cretaceous, 129–125 Ma

Extinct genus of dinosaurs

Planicoxa is a genus of advanced iguanodontian dinosaur from the Early Cretaceous of North America. It is known from the partial skeletons of several individual specimens. Its fossils were discovered in Utah, United States.

The type species for the genus is Planicoxa venenica, first described by Tony DiCroce and Kenneth Carpenter in 2001. Its discovery was made in the Poison Strip Sandstone Member of the Cedar Mountain Formation in Grand County, Utah, United States. The generic name, Planicoxa, which means "flat hip", refers to the flat appearance of the ilium formed by horizontal folding over of the postacetabular process (rear portion of the ilium), the defining characteristic of the genus; venenica, the specific name, is Latin for "poison" in reference to the Poison Strip Sandstone Member of the Cedar Mountain Formation where the discovery was made. The taxon is represented by a well-preserved ilium, femora, tibiae, and vertebrae, as well as other material. The femora are standard for ornithopods, but the ilium has a short, horizontal postacetabular process that is functionally an antitrochanter. The discovery of P. venenica added significant information to the Barremian-Albian fauna of the Cedar Mountain Formation. The species is estimated to have reached 4.5 metres (15 ft) and weighed 450 kilograms (990 lb).

A second species, P. depressa, was created by Carpenter and Wilson (2008) for material previously named Camptosaurus depressus by Charles Gilmore in 1909. That material was collected from the Lakota Formation near the town of Hot Springs, South Dakota. It too has the odd flat ilium formed by the horizontal postacetabular process. This species differs from P. venenica in that the ilium is not as arched, has a thicker (more robust) preacetabular process (long, forward projection of the ilium), a shallower acetabular notch (hip-socket), and a proportionally narrower brevis shelf (a shelf for muscles on the inside of the rear part of the ilium). It is known from some vertebrae and two ilia. Isolated iguanodontid bones from the Lakota Formation probably belong to this species. In 2011, it was assigned to its own genus, Osmakasaurus.
