= Napaisaurus =

Napaisaurus Temporal range: Early Cretaceous, 120–100 Ma

Scientific classification
- Domain: Eukaryota
- Kingdom: Animalia
- Phylum: Chordata
- Clade: Dinosauria
- Clade: †Ornithischia
- Clade: †Ornithopoda
- Clade: †Styracosterna
- Genus: †Napaisaurus; Ji & Zhang, 2022

Type species
- Napaisaurus guangxiensis Ji & Zhang, 2022

Extinct genus of iguanodontian dinosaurs

Napaisaurus is a genus of iguanodontian ornithopod dinosaur from the Early Cretaceous Xinlong Formation of Guangxi, China. The type and only species is N. guangxiensis.

== Discovery and naming ==
The Napaisaurus holotype, FS-20-007–008, consists of a right ilium and ischium discovered in 2020. A mix of diagonstic characters observed in the material led Ji & Zhang to describe it as a new genus and species in 2022. The generic name, "Napaisaurus", combines a reference to the type locality in the Napai Basin with the Greek word "saurus", meaning "lizard". The specific name, "guangxiensis", references Guangxi Zhuang Autonomous Region where the fossils were discovered. Napaisaurus represents the first basal iguanodontian to be named from southern China.

Napaisaurus was mentioned in a review of fossil of ornithischians from Southeast Asia and southern China in 2023 by Manitkoon et al. They suggested that the Napaisaurus holotype should be compared to the undescribed ischium and ilium of Sirindhorna in future research.
