= Neslen Formation =

Geologic formation in Utah, United States

- Stratigraphic range: 76–75 Ma
- Type: Formation
- Unit of: Mesaverde Group
- Underlies: Castlegate Sandstone
- Overlies: Sego Sandstone
- Thickness: ~100 meters

Lithology
- Primary: Mudstone, stilttone and sandstone
- Other: Coal

Location
- Region: Utah
- Country: United States

The Upper Cretaceous Neslen Formation is a geologic formation in Utah. It preserves fossils dating back to the Cretaceous period. It has been exploited for coal. The Kaiparowits Formation is closely associated.

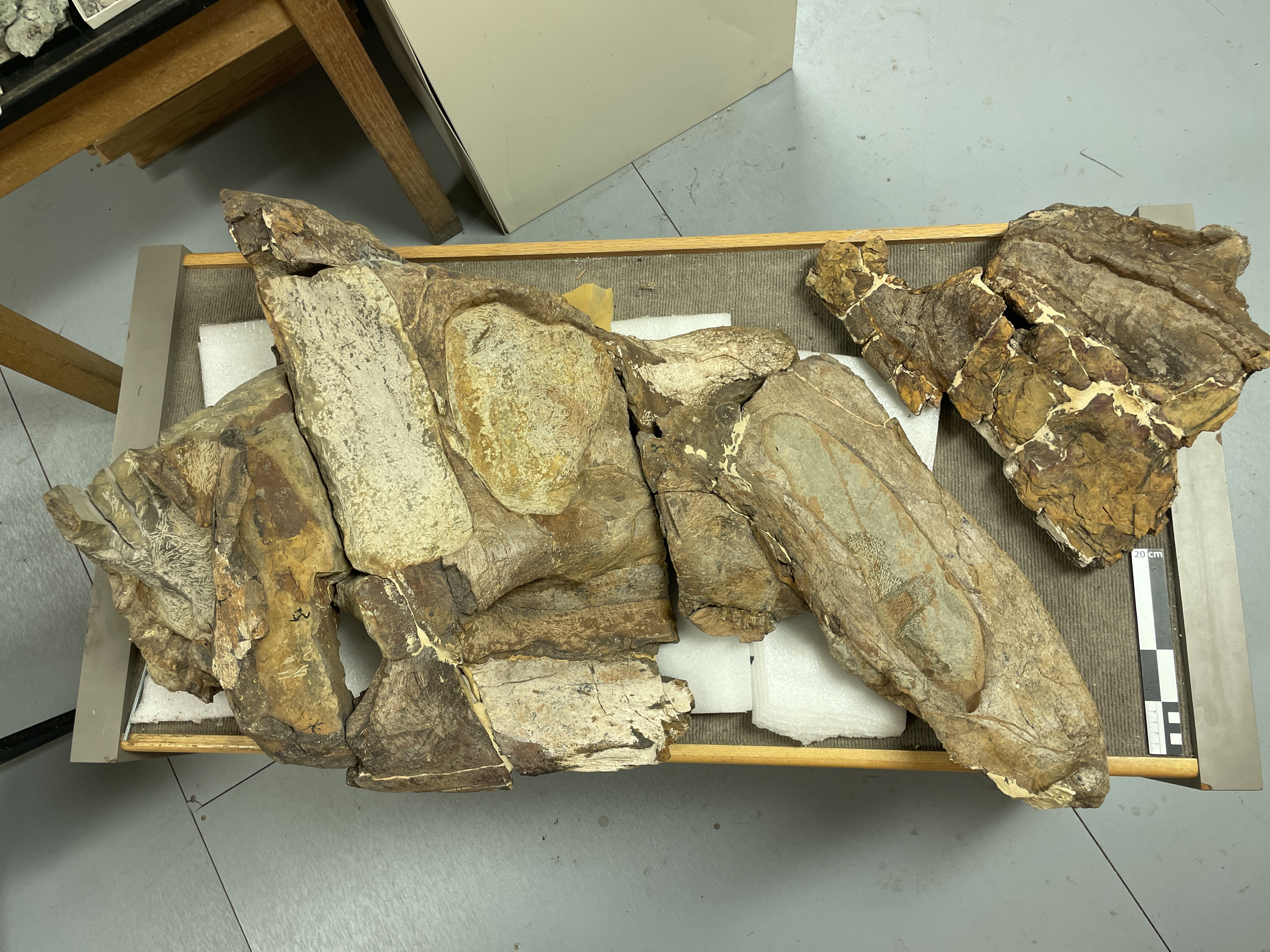
Skull of Rhinorex condrupus from the Neslen Formation of Utah

Two different types of dinosaur fossils have been reported from the formation. The first is a diagnostic tyrannosaurid foot, the second being the type and only specimen of Rhinorex.

== See also ==
- List of fossiliferous stratigraphic units in Utah
- Paleontology in Utah
