= Allen Formation =

Geological formation in Argentina

- Stratigraphic range: Mid Campanian-Maastrichtian; ~73–66 Ma
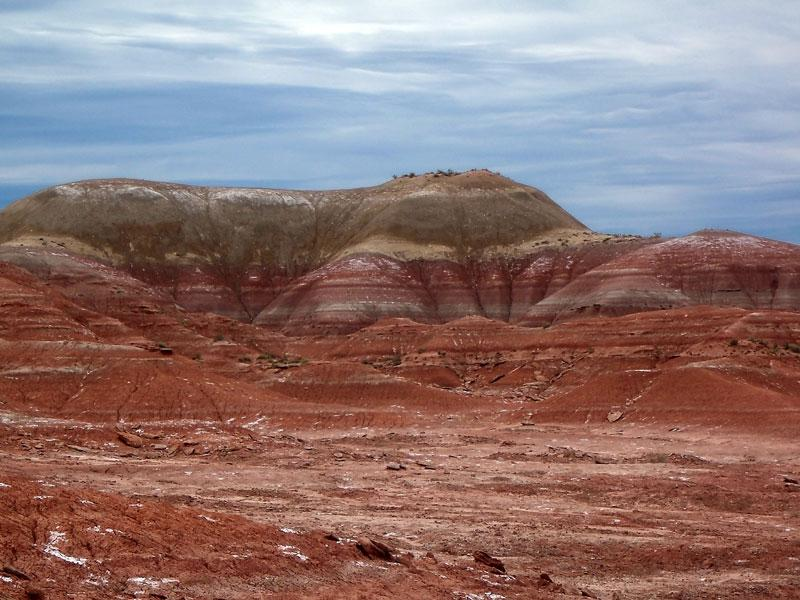
- Outcrop of the Allen and Anacleto Formations at Auca Mahuida
- Type: Geological formation
- Unit of: Malargüe Group
- Underlies: Jagüel Formation
- Overlies: Anacleto Formation
- Thickness: up to 70 m (230 ft)

Lithology
- Primary: Mudstone, sandstone
- Other: Limestone

Location
- Coordinates: 40.0°S 66.6°W
- Approximate paleocoordinates: 42.8°S 52.2°W
- Region: Neuquén, Río Negro & La Pampa Provinces
- Country: Argentina
- Extent: Neuquén Basin

Type section
- Named by: Uliana & Dellapé
- Year defined: 1981
- Allen Formation (Argentina)

The Allen Formation is a geological formation in Argentina whose strata date back to the Late Cretaceous (middle Campanian to late Maastrichtian). Dinosaur remains are among the fossils that have been recovered from the formation. Indeterminate chelid remains and other vertebrates have also been discovered in this formation.

== Description ==
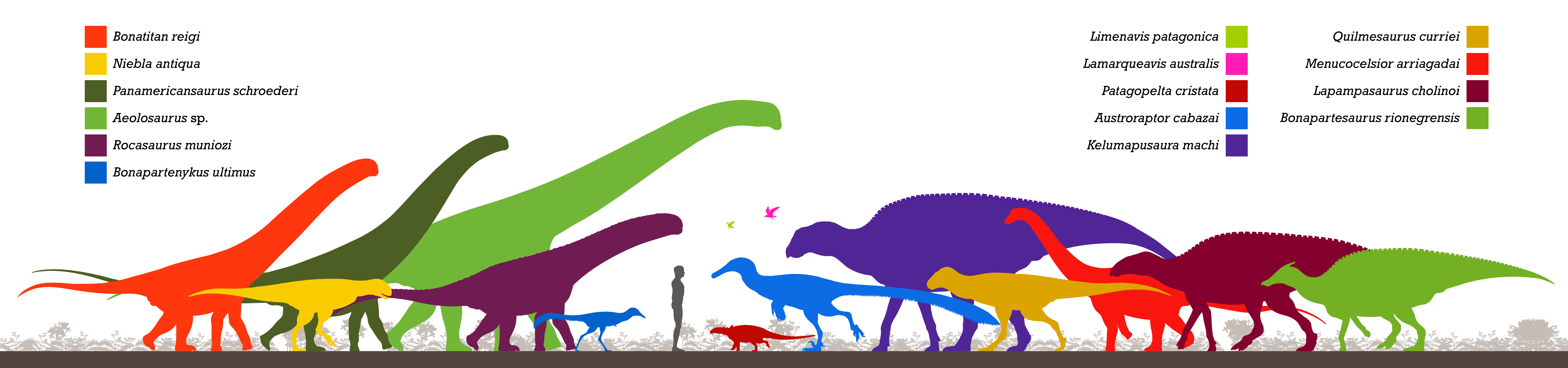
Fauna of Allen Formation

Uliana and Dellapé defined the formation's stratotype in 1981 in the eastern area of the Bajo de Añelo, where the relation between the base and top is clearly exposed. The deposits are mostly clastic, interbedded with banks of limestone and layers of anhydrite, which were defined as continental and shallow marine facies associated with semiarid conditions.

The interpreted sedimentary paleoenvironments range from purely continental such as ephemeral lacustrine, aeolian and fluvial systems to coastal marine paleoenvironments with development of estuaries and tidal flats, followed by a lagoon sedimentary stage from marsh to sea with carbonate precipitation in an area protected from waves, ending with a retraction leading to the accumulation of evaporites.

Armas and Sánchez performed a detailed facies analysis of the formation in 2015, where the authors concluded the formation represents a hybrid coastal system of tidal flats, dominated by Atlantic ingressions, with a large storm influence in some areas linked to aeolian systems.

A study of pollen found in outcrops of the middle member of the Allen Formation supported a late Maastrichtian age for these layers.

== Fossil content ==
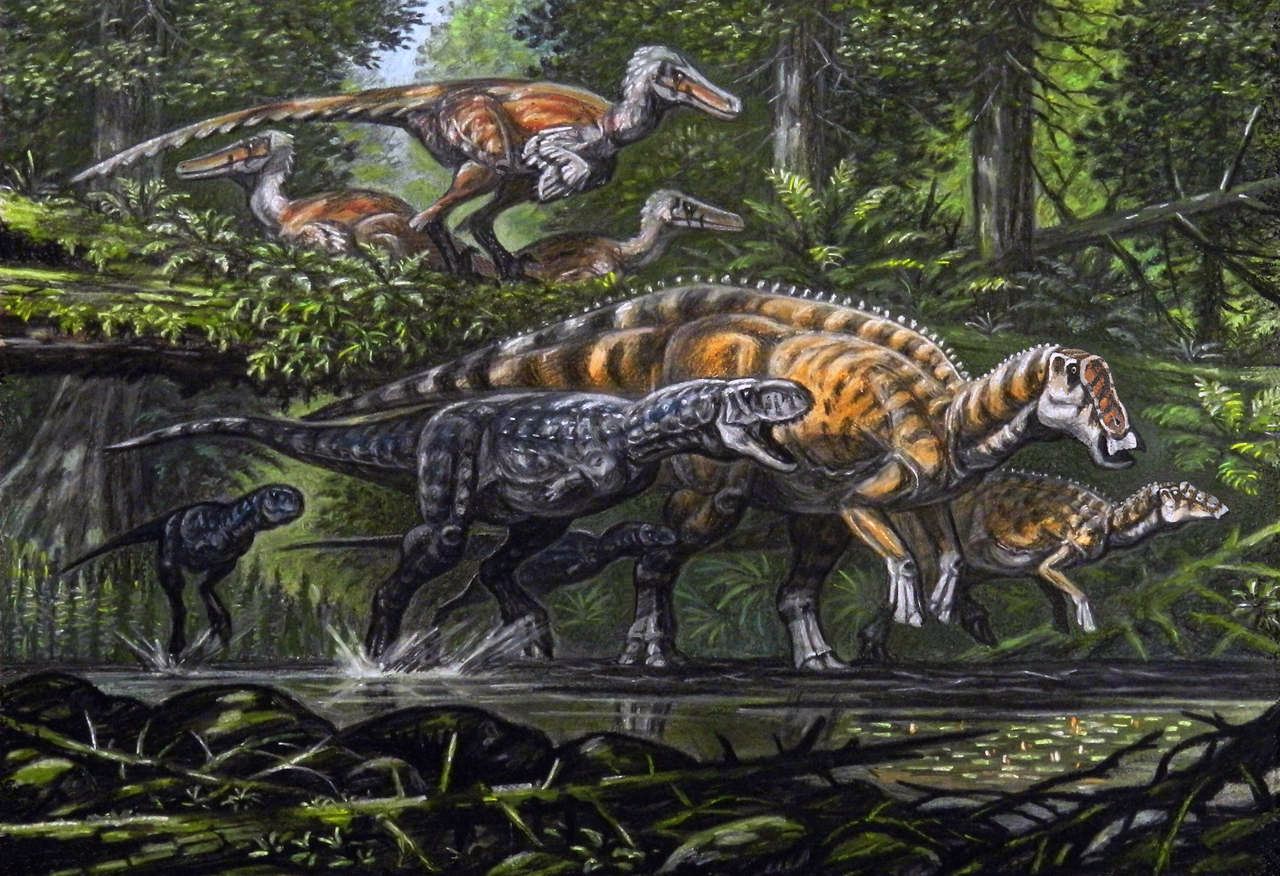
Life restoration of some dinosaurs discovered in the Allen Formation

Color key: Taxon / Reclassified taxon / Taxon falsely reported as present / Dubious taxon or junior synonym / Ichnotaxon / Ootaxon / Morphotaxon

Notes
Uncertain or tentative taxa are in small text
~~crossed out~~ taxa are discredited.

=== Dinosaurs ===
Dinosaur eggs are known from the formation.

==== Ornithischians ====
===== Ankylosaurs =====
Genus	Species	Location	Stratigraphic position	Material	Notes	Images
Ankylosauria Indet.	Indeterminate	Arriagada Farm		Two teeth, five osteoderms, and a partial sacrum	Fossil remains possibly belonging to a parankylosaur distinct from Patagopelta	
Patagopelta	P. cristata	Salitral Moreno locality	Lower	Multiple specimens and fragmentary remains, including skull bones, vertebrae, limb bones and girdles, and osteoderms.	A parankylosaur	

===== Hadrosaurs =====
Genus	Species	Location	Stratigraphic position	Material	Notes	Images
Bonapartesaurus	B. rionegrensis	Salitral Moreno and Islas Malvinas.	Lower	A partial skeleton.	A austrokritosaurian saurolophine	
Kelumapusaura	K. machi	Cerro Matadero, Arriagada Farm	Upper	Partial skull, a cervical vertebrae, several sacrals, sternal rib and sternal plate, and multiple referred specimens found in a bonebed	A austrokrytosaurian saurolophine	
Lapampasaurus	L. cholinoi	Islas Malvinas	Lower	Elements of the axial and appendicular skeleton of a subadult individual	A hadrosaurid hadrosaur	
Willinakaqe	W. salitralensis	Salitral Moreno site.	Lower	A right premaxilla.	A saurolophine hadrosaurid	

==== Saurischians ====
===== Sauropods =====
Genus	Species	Location	Stratigraphic position	Material	Notes	Images
Aeolosaurus	A. rionegrinus		Lower		A aeolosaurin lithostrotian	Aeolosaurus Bonatitan Rocasaurus Pellegrinisaurus
Bonatitan	B.reigi		Lower	Braincases, caudal vertebrae, and several limb elements	A saltasaurin saltasaurine	Aeolosaurus Bonatitan Rocasaurus Pellegrinisaurus
Menucocelsior	M. arriagadai		Lower	Seventeen caudal vertebrae and several appendicular bones: a right humerus, a left fibula and some metapodial.	A eutitanosaurian titanosaur	Aeolosaurus Bonatitan Rocasaurus Pellegrinisaurus
Panamericansaurus	P. schroederi			"Five tail vertebrata, sacral vertebrae, left humerus and rib fragments"	A aeolosaurin lithostrotian	Aeolosaurus Bonatitan Rocasaurus Pellegrinisaurus
Pellegrinisaurus?	P. powelli		Lower (if it is from the formation)	"Dorsal and caudal vertebrae, partial femur"	A opisthocoelocaudiine saltasaurid	Aeolosaurus Bonatitan Rocasaurus Pellegrinisaurus
Rocasaurus	R. muniozi		Middle	"Partial postcranial skeleton"	A saltasaurin saltasaurine	Aeolosaurus Bonatitan Rocasaurus Pellegrinisaurus
Titanosauria	indeterminate		Middle	Teeth and partial skeleton	Lacks diagnostic materials to be named.	Aeolosaurus Bonatitan Rocasaurus Pellegrinisaurus

===== Theropods =====
Genus	Species	Location	Stratigraphic position	Material	Notes	Images
Austroraptor	A. cabazai		Lower	A fragmentary skeleton including parts of the skull, lower jaw, a few neck and torso vertebrae, some ribs, a humerus, and assorted bones from both legs	A unenlagiine theropod	
Bonapartenykus	B. ultimus		Upper	A holotype consists of a mid-dorsal vertebra, both scapulocoracoids, left tibia and femur, left pubis articulated with the pubic peduncle of the ilium, the anterior blade of the left ilium, and two partially preserved eggs.	A patagonykine alvarezsaurid	
Lamarqueavis	L. australis		Lower	"Right coracoid with damaged sternal and omal extremities, and lacking acrocoracoidal process"	A cimolopterygid ornithuran	
Limenavis	L. patagonica		Lower	"Partial forelimb"	A ornithuran bird	
Niebla	N. antiqua		Upper	Braincase, fragmentary jaw and teeth, relatively complete scapulocoracoid, dorsal ribs, and incomplete vertebrae.	A brachyrostran abelisaurid	
Quilmesaurus	Q. curriei		Upper	Femur and distal tibia	A carnotaurin furileusaurian	

=== Pterosaurs ===
Fragmentary fossils are known from the formation.

Genus	Species	Location	Stratigraphic position	Material	Notes	Images
Aerotitan	A. sudamericanus	Bajo de Arriagada	Upper	Partial rostrum	The first unambiguous azhdarchid pterosaur from South-America	

=== Fish ===
Genus	Species	Location	Stratigraphic position	Material	Notes	Images
Atlantoceratodus	A. patagonicus			3 tooth plates	A ceratorontiform lungfish	
Belonostomus	B. lamarquensis				A aspidorhynchid fish	
Chondrichthyes Indet	indeterminate			11 vertebral centra		
Diplomystidae Indet.	indeterminate			4 incomplete pectoral spines		
Siluriformes Indet.	indeterminate			5 incomplete pectoral spines		
Lepisosteidae Indet	indeterminate			6 vertebral centra		
Teleostei Indet.	indeterminate			10 isolated teeth		
cf. Percichthyidae Indet.	indeterminate			19 fragmentary vertebrae		

=== Squamata ===
Genus	Species	Location	Stratigraphic position	Material	Notes	Images
Alamitophis	A. argentinus			incomplete trunk vertebra	A madtsoiid snake	
Madtsoiidae Indet.	indeterminate			incomplete trunk vertebra		
Paleoteius	P. lakui	Bonapartenykus site on Arriagada Farm	Upper	A specimen consists of a partial skull and skeleton belonging to a single individual.	A scincomorph lizard	
Patagoniophis	P. parvus			incomplete trunk vertebra	A madtsoiid snake	
Pleurodonta Indet.	indeterminate			incomplete left maxilla		
?Scincoidea Indet.	indeterminate			incomplete left maxilla		
Teiioidea Indet.	indeterminate			incomplete right maxilla		

=== Turtles ===
Genus	Species	Location	Stratigraphic position	Material	Notes	Images
Iaremys	I. batrachomorpha				A chelid turtle	
Trapalcochelys	T. sulcata				A meiolaniform turtle	
Yaminuechelys	Y. gasperinii				A chelid turtle	

=== Rhynchocephalia ===
Genus	Species	Location	Stratigraphic position	Material	Notes	Images
Lamarquesaurus	L. cabazai	Cerro Tortuga			A neosphenodontian sphenodontian	

=== Plesiosauria ===
Genus	Species	Location	Stratigraphic position	Material	Notes	Images
Kawanectes	K. lafquenianum	Quarry of the “Bentonitas Patagónicas” company	Upper	A partial skeleton consists of six cervical vertebrae, three dorsal vertebrae, three sacral vertebrae, nine caudal vertebrae, right femur, right humerus, ilium, one 216 mesopodial element, one caudal phalanx and one caudal rib .	A weddellonectian elasmosaurid	

=== Frogs ===
Unnamed frogs belonging to the family Calyptocephalellidae and Leptodactylidae, and those with no family designation were also found.

Genus	Species	Location	Stratigraphic position	Material	Notes	Images
Calyptocephalella	C. satan	Cerro Tortuga	Lower	A right incomplete maxilla.	A calyptocephalellid frog	
Kuruleufenia	K. xenopoides	Cerro Tortuga, Bajo Santa Rosa, and Cerro Bonaparte	Lower	An almost complete sphenethmoid.	A pipid frog	

=== Mammals ===
The mammal fauna of the Allen Formation is known from seven teeth, which document the presence of several species.

Genus	Species	Location	Material	Notes	Images
Mesungulatum	M. lamarquensis	Cerro Tortuga	Two upper molars and a fragmentary lower molar	A dryolestoid mammal	
Groebertherium	G. stipanicici	Cerro Tortuga	One upper molar	A dryolestoid mammal	
cf. Brandonia	sp.	Cerro Tortuga	One lower molar	A dryolestoid mammal	
Barberenia	B. allenensis	Cerro Tortuga	One upper molariform	A dryolestoid mammal	
Solanutherium	S. walshi	Cerro Tortuga	A right lower molar and left dentary fragment.	A meridiolestid cladotherian	
Trapalcotherium	T. matuastensis	Cerro Tortuga	One first lower molar	A feruliotheriid gondwanathere	

=== Plants ===
Genus	Species	Location	Stratigraphic position	Material	Notes	Images
Podocarpoxylon	P. mazzonii	Valcheta Petrified Forest, Río Negro Province.	Lower	Fossil wood	A conifer tree	
Wintucycas	W. stevensonii	Salitral Ojo de Agua, Río Negro Province.	Lower	Silicificated cycad trunks	An encephalartoid cycad	

== See also ==
- List of dinosaur-bearing rock formations
- Adamantina Formation
- La Colonia Formation
- Lecho Formation
- Los Alamitos Formation
- Los Llanos Formation
- Marília Formation
