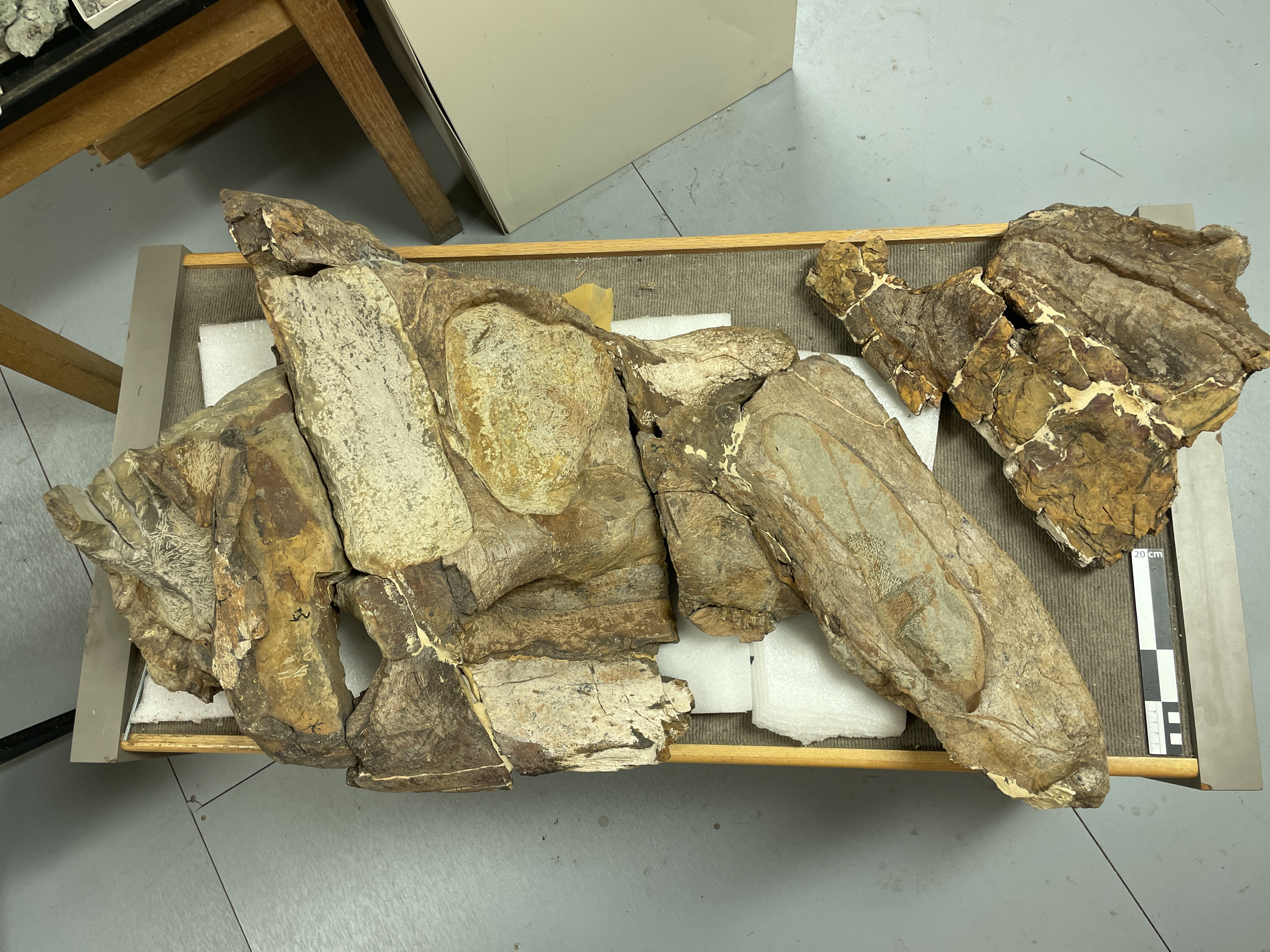
- Holotype skull

Scientific classification
- Kingdom: Animalia
- Phylum: Chordata
- Class: Reptilia
- Clade: Dinosauria
- Clade: †Ornithischia
- Clade: †Ornithopoda
- Family: †Hadrosauridae
- Subfamily: †Saurolophinae
- Tribe: †Kritosaurini
- Genus: †Rhinorex; Gates & Scheetz, 2014

Type species
- †Rhinorex condrupus Gates & Scheetz, 2014

= Rhinorex =

Rhinorex Temporal range: Late Cretaceous, 75 Ma

Extinct genus of reptiles

Rhinorex is a genus of kritosaurin hadrosaur from the Late Cretaceous Neslen Formation, in central Utah. Its exact placement in time is uncertain, though it probably dates to 75 million years ago and was discovered in estuarine sediments.

== Discovery ==
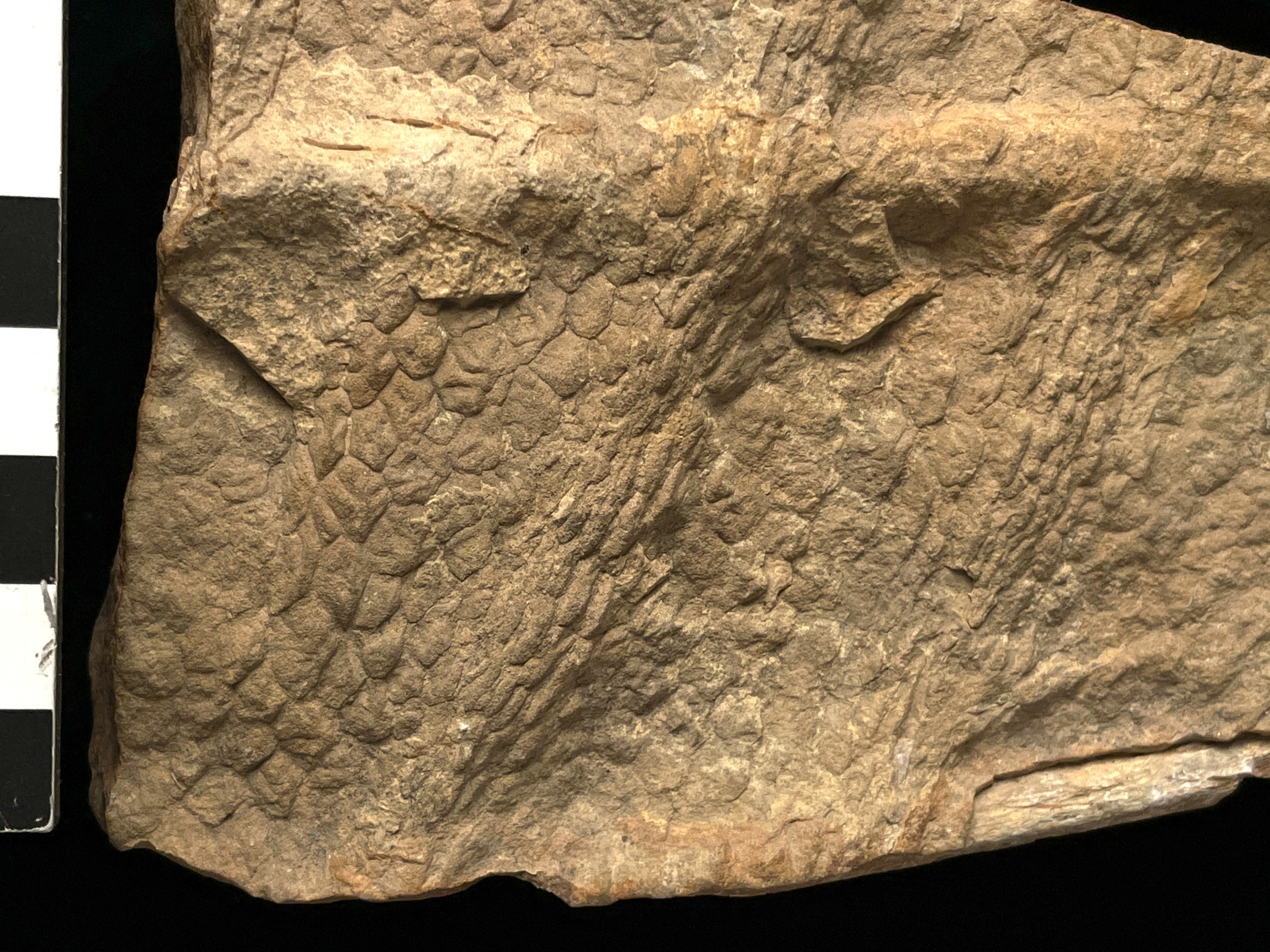
Skin impressions

The holotype specimen BYU 13258 is composed of a partial but mostly articulated skeleton, which includes the skull, the vertebral column, a partial pelvis, and skin impressions.

The type and only species known is Rhinorex condrupus. The genus name is derived from the Greek word "rhinos" which means "nose", and the Latin word "rex" which means "king." The specific name is derived from the Latin word "condo" which means "bury" and refers to the specimen being buried in rock and the Latin word "rupes" which means "cliffs" and is a reference to the fossil being discovered in the Book Cliffs of Utah.

== Classification ==
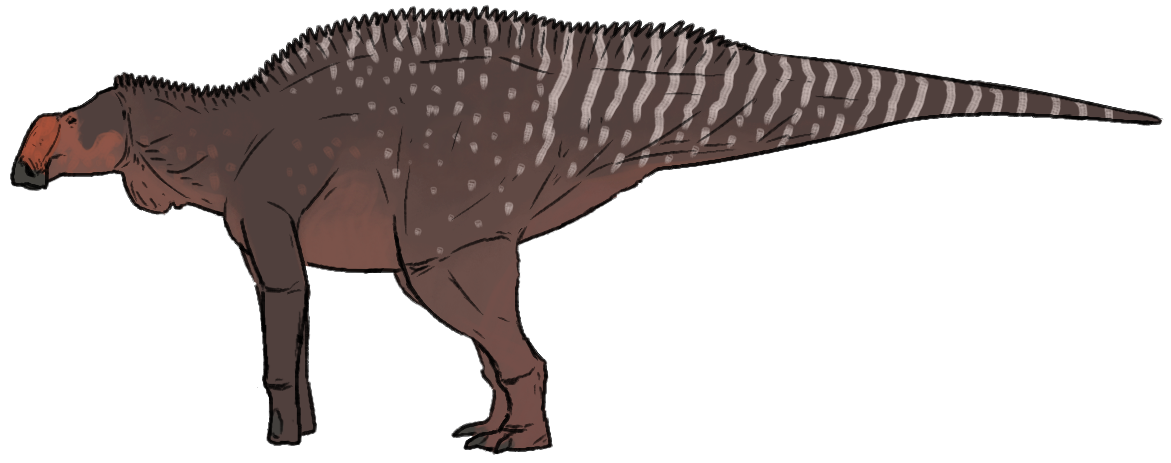
Life restoration

It is likely a close relative of Gryposaurus, and indeed some have suggested that it falls within the genus Gryposaurus, as the phylogenetic analysis indicates.

It is found in a very similar time and place as Gryposaurus monumentensis and Gryposaurus sp. This would challenge the idea of provincialism in Late Cretaceous Laramidian faunas. It may be that Rhinorex lived in more coastal environments than Gryposaurus.

== See also ==
- Timeline of hadrosaur research
