= Lapampasaurus =

Lapampasaurus Temporal range: Late Cretaceous, 76–70 Ma

Scientific classification
- Kingdom: Animalia
- Phylum: Chordata
- Class: Reptilia
- Clade: Dinosauria
- Clade: †Ornithischia
- Clade: †Ornithopoda
- Family: †Hadrosauridae
- Genus: †Lapampasaurus; Coria, Riga & Casadío, 2012

Type species
- †Lapampasaurus cholinoi Coria, Riga & Casadío, 2012

Extinct genus of reptiles

Lapampasaurus is an extinct genus of hadrosaurid known from the Late Cretaceous Allen Formation (late Campanian or early Maastrichtian stage) of La Pampa Province, Argentina. It contains a single species, Lapampasaurus cholinoi. The generic name refers to the Argentine province of La Pampa. The specific name honours the late collector José Cholino. The material includes cervical, dorsal, sacral and caudal vertebrae, the forelimb girdle, and the partial hindlimb.

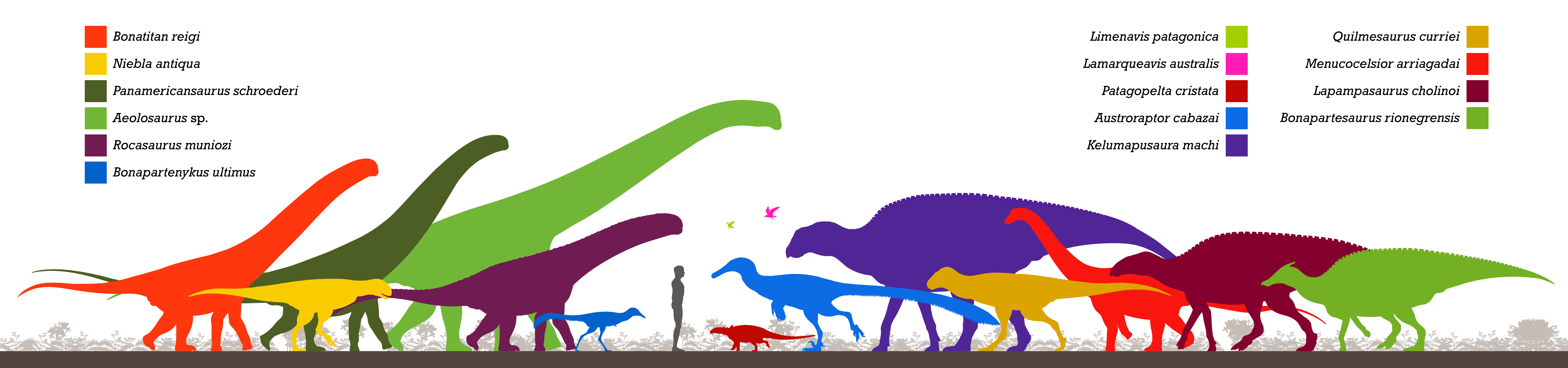
Contemporaneous known fauna from the Allen Formation (Lapampasaurus in maroon, right)

== See also ==
- Timeline of hadrosaur research
