= Kundur =

Kundur may refer to:

- Kundur, Afghanistan, a village in Herat Province which is primarily Mogholi speaking
- Kundur, Iran, a village in East Azerbaijan Province, Iran
- Kundur, Russia, a rural locality in Amur Oblast, Russia
- Kundur Island, an island in Indonesia, in the Riau Archipelago, and part of the Riau Islands Province
- Kündür, an official in the Khazar government
- Deepa Kundur, Canadian engineer
- Kundura, an administrative block in Jeypore subdivision, Koraput district, Odisha, India
- Frankincense, kundur in Indian languages
- Momordica charantia or Bitter melon, kandur/kunduru in Indian languages

== See also ==
- Kandar (disambiguation)
- Kandara (disambiguation)
- Kundra (disambiguation)
- Kundar (disambiguation)
- Kunturi (disambiguation)
- Kunduru, an Indian surname
