= Mark Steiner (musician) =

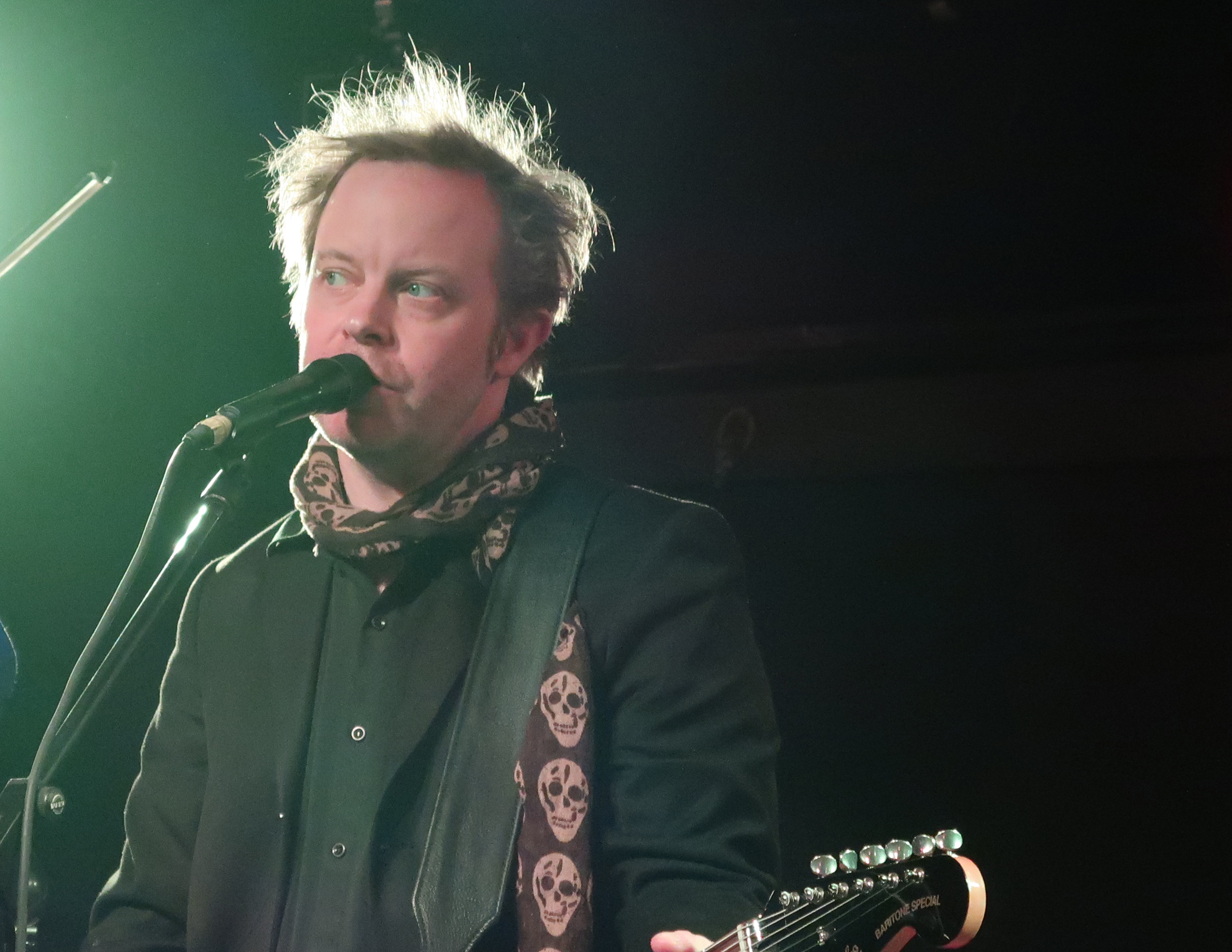
- Mark Steiner, November 2017, Berlin, Badehaus

Background information
- Also known as: Piker, Piker Ryan
- Born: Mark Steiner; 1970 (age 54–55)
- Genres: Post-punk
- Occupation(s): Musician, songwriter, film maker
- Years active: 1988–present
- Labels: Stagger Records (Paris), Z-Man Records (Melbourne), Plug Ugly Records (New York City), Rabben Records (Oslo)
- Website: Stagger Home Music, Stagger Records (France), Z-Man Records (Australia)

Mark Steiner (born 1970) is a Norwegian-American rock musician, guitarist, songwriter and producer.

In 1997, through a classified ad in The Village Voice, Steiner started a band called Piker Ryan's Folly. It gave its last performance in 2000 at CBGB, at an event intended to save a neighboring tenement building, 295 Bowery, from demolition. Afterwards Eric Wolter and Steiner started a new band called Kundera. In 2002, Steiner moved to Oslo, Norway. In 2006, he contributed a track to a tribute CD for Australian musician Rowland S. Howard. In 2007 he recorded songs in Paris and New York for a debut solo CD Fallen Birds. In 2009, a second record "Broken" was released in a two-CD edition by Z-Man Records. In late 2014, he released Saudade under the name of Mark Steiner & His Problems, which featured both original works as well as interpretations of songs by deceased artists Billie Holiday, Lou Reed, Bruno Adams, Robert Burås, and Rowland S. Howard. He has performed as an opening act for Michael Gira, Kid Congo Powers, Devendra Banhart, Mick Harvey, Madrugada, Norwegian singer Ingrid Olava, Rowland S. Howard, Hugo Race and others.

== Band history ==
- Unified Division (vocalist, songwriter);
- The Third of May (bass guitar);
- Piker Ryan's Folly (vocalist, songwriter) with founding member Phil "The Tremolo King" Vanderyken (guitar) and members Christopher Mele (drums), Peter Mele (bass), Eric Wolter (piano) and several others;
- Kundera (vocalist, songwriter, guitar) with founding members Eric "The Heretic" Wolter (piano, vocalist) and Susan Mitchell (violin) and featured guest member Jerome O'Brien (string bass);
- The Mirror Reveals (bass guitar) with founding member James Babbo (guitar, songwriter) and members Kit Messick (vocalist) and Joanna Dalin (violin);
- Chimney Sweepers (vocalist, songwriter, guitar – Norway, 2003);
- Mark Steiner and The Broken Men (vocalist, songwriter, guitar – Norway and New York City, 2004–2005);
- Mark Steiner and The Debauchery (vocalist, songwriter, guitar – Norway, 2006);
- Mark Steiner and The Fallen Birds (vocalist, songwriter, guitar – France and Norway, 2006–2008);
- Mark Steiner and The Fallen Little Birds (vocalist, songwriter, guitar – 2008 Australian Tour);
- Saudade (baritone guitar, co-vocalist and co-songwriter) with founding member Thomas Borge (bass) and member Tobias "Tex" Lange (drums);
- Mark Steiner and The Broken Birds (vocalist, songwriter, guitar – 2009 Australian Tour);
- Mark Steiner and His Problems (vocalist, songwriter, guitar – present).

== Discography ==
- Piker Ryan's Folly: Lowlife EP-CD (Spectre Productions, 1998);
- Piker Ryan's Folly: Bowery Blues LP-CD (live at CBGB) (Spectre Productions, 1999);
- The Mirror Reveals (vocal): "The Undying Man" single from Frames of Teknicolor LP-CD (Middle Pillar Presents, 2000);
- The Mirror Reveals (vocal): "Moon's on Fire" single from This Infinite Eye LP-CD (Middle Pillar Presents, 2004);
- Mark Steiner and The Debauchery: "Reason" single from In Glorious Mono compilation 2-CD (HoneyMilk Records, 2006);
- Mark Steiner: "Silver Chain" single from A Tribute to Rowland S. Howard compilation 2-CD (Stagger Records Stagg002, 2006);
- Mark Steiner: Fallen Birds Mini-LP CD and 12" gatefold vinyl EP (Stagger Records Stagg003, 2007);
- Mark Steiner: Broken 12" vinyl LP (Z-Man Records (Australia), 2009) and CD (Stagger Records Stagg008, 2009);
- Mark Steiner: Broken / Fallen Birds special edition 2-CD (Z-Man Records (Australia), 2009);
- Mark Steiner and The Fallen Birds: Beautiful Thief 10" gatefold vinyl EP (b/w Mark Steiner featuring Tex Napalm "Sea of Disappointment", Stagger Records, Stagg007, 2009);
- Mark Steiner & His Problems: Saudade CD (Plug Ugly Records (USA), 2014);
- Mark Steiner & His Problems: Saudade limited edition 2x12" vinyl LP (Rabben Records (Norway), 2015).

== Filmography ==
- To Build an Empire, 1996 documentary feature on the New Jersey gothic-punk band Empire Hideous (Director/Camera/Editor/Producer);
- Xmas Trip, 1996 music video for the Matador band Run On (Director/Camera/Editor/Producer).
