= Kundra =

Kundra may refer to:

Places

- Kundra, Budaun, is a village in Budaun district, Uttar Pradesh, India

People

- Karan Kundra (born 1984), Indian television actor
- Navin Kundra (born 1985), British-Indian singer/songwriter
- Nitin Kundra, British-Indian actor
- Raj Kundra (born 1975), British-Indian businessman
- Vivek Kundra (born 1974), Indian-American administrator
- Bharat Kundra, Indian actor, model, and anchor
- Shilpa Shetty Kundra, Indian actress, businesswoman

== See also ==
- Kundar (disambiguation)
- Kundur (disambiguation)
- Kundera, an unrelated Czechoslovak surname
  - Milan Kundera (1929–2023), Czech novelist
  - František Kundra (born 1980), Slovak football midfielder
