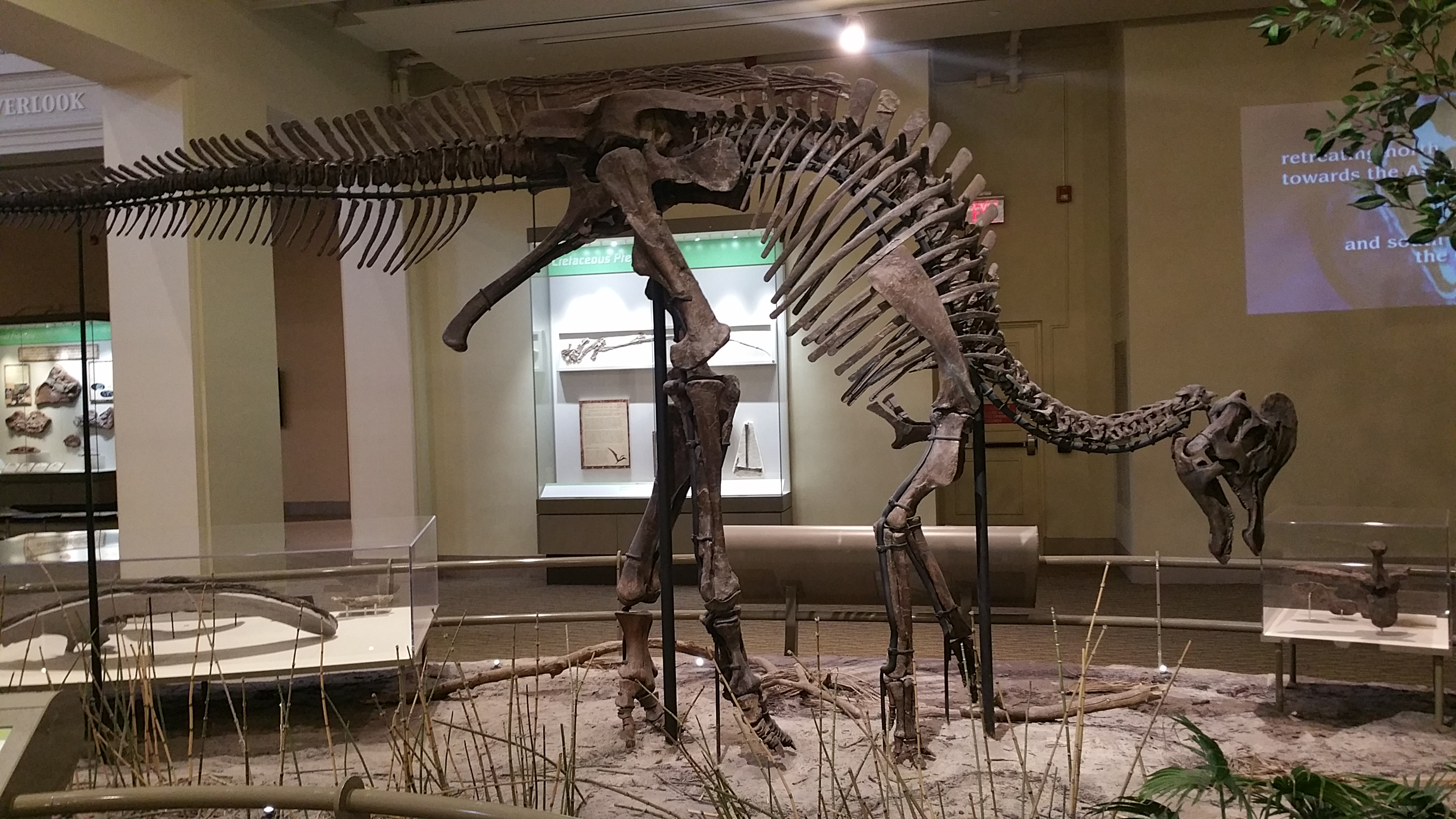
- Skeleton at the Carnegie Museum of Natural History

Scientific classification
- Kingdom: Animalia
- Phylum: Chordata
- Class: Reptilia
- Clade: Dinosauria
- Clade: †Ornithischia
- Clade: †Ornithopoda
- Family: †Hadrosauridae
- Subfamily: †Lambeosaurinae
- Tribe: †Lambeosaurini
- Genus: †Corythosaurus; Brown, 1914

Type species
- †Corythosaurus casuarius Brown, 1914

Species
- †C. casuarius Brown, 1914 (type); †C. intermedius (Parks, 1923 [originally Stephanosaurus]); †?C. stebingeri (Horner & Currie, 1994 [originally H. stebingeri])

Synonyms
- List: Corythosaurus excavatus Gilmore, 1923; Stephanosaurus intermedius Parks, 1923; Procheneosaurus erectofrons (Parks, 1931 [originally Tetragonosaurus]); Tetragonosaurus erectofrons Parks, 1931; Corythosaurus bicristatus Parks, 1935; Corythosaurus brevicristatus Parks, 1935

= Corythosaurus =

Corythosaurus Temporal range: Late Cretaceous (Campanian), 77–75.7 Ma

Extinct genus of dinosaurs

Corythosaurus (/kəˌrɪθəˈsɔːrəs/; lit. 'helmeted lizard') is a genus of hadrosaurid "duck-billed" dinosaur from the Late Cretaceous period, about 77–75.7 million years ago, in what is now western North America. Its name is derived from the Greek word κόρυς, meaning "helmet", named and described in 1914 by Barnum Brown. Corythosaurus is now thought to be a lambeosaurine, thus related to Lambeosaurus, Nipponosaurus, Velafrons, Hypacrosaurus, and Olorotitan. Corythosaurus has an estimated length of 7.7–9 metres (25–30 ft) and has a skull, including the crest, that is 70.8 centimetres (27.9 in; 2.32 ft) tall.

Corythosaurus is known from many complete specimens, including the nearly complete holotype found by Brown in 1911. The holotype skeleton is only missing the last section of the tail and part of the front legs, but was preserved with impressions of polygonal scales. Corythosaurus is known from many skulls with tall crests that resemble those of the cassowary and a Corinthian helmet. The most likely function of the crest is thought to be vocalization. As in a trombone, sound waves would travel through many chambers in the crest and then get amplified when Corythosaurus exhaled. One Corythosaurus specimen has even been preserved with its last meal in its chest cavity. Inside the cavity were remains of conifer needles, seeds, twigs, and fruits, suggesting that Corythosaurus probably fed on all of these.

The two species of Corythosaurus are both present in slightly different levels of the Dinosaur Park Formation. Both still co-existed with theropods and other ornithischians, like Daspletosaurus, Brachylophosaurus, Parasaurolophus, Scolosaurus, and Chasmosaurus.

== Discovery and species ==
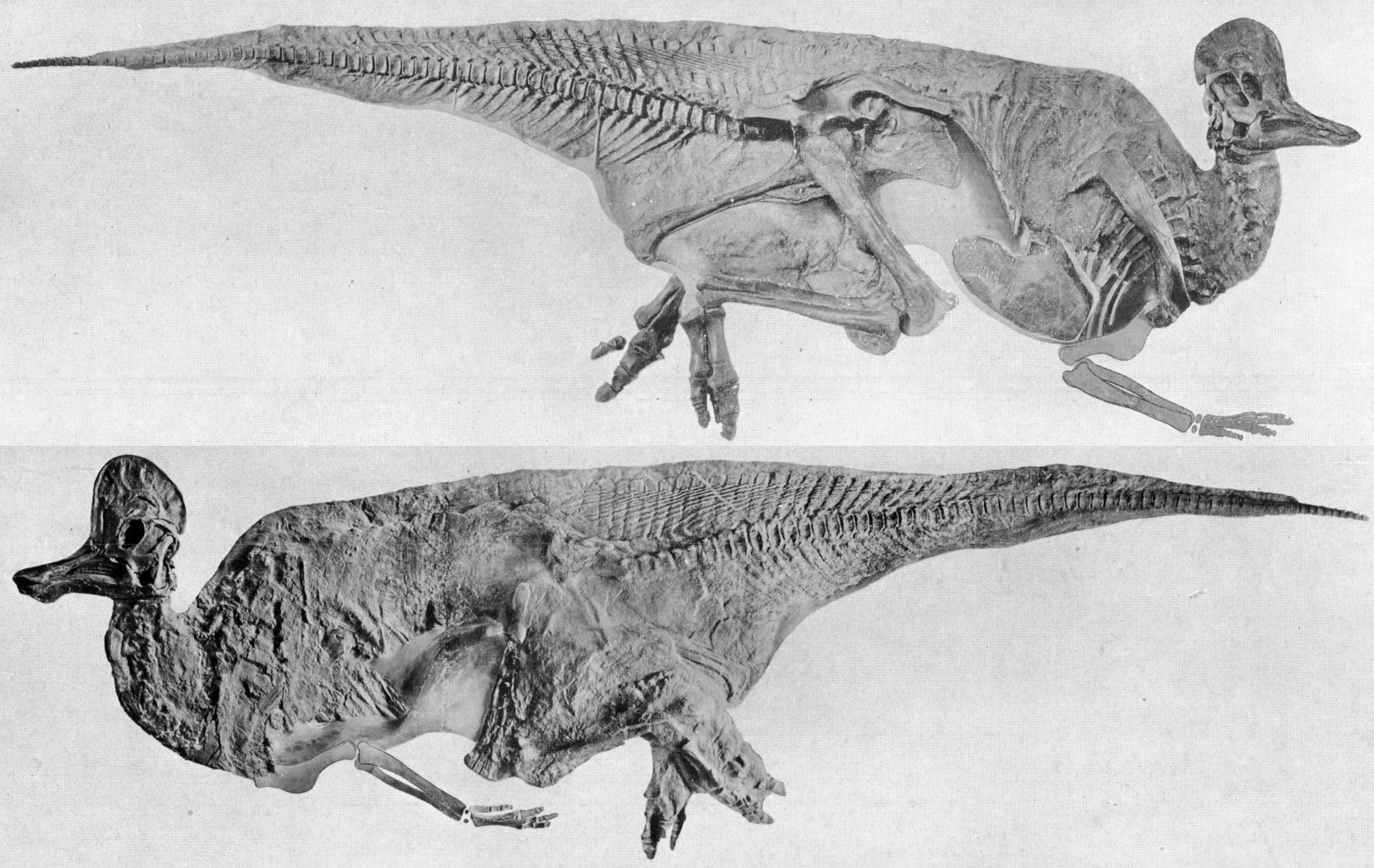
Fossil holotype specimen AMNH 5240 partially covered in skin impressions

The first specimen, AMNH 5240, was discovered in 1911 by Barnum Brown in Red Deer River of Alberta and secured by him in the Fall of 1912. As well as an almost complete skeleton, the find was notable because impressions of much of the creature's skin had also survived. The specimen came from the Belly River Group of the province. The left or underside of the skeleton was preserved in carbonaceous clay, making it difficult to expose the skin to the elements. The skeleton was articulated and missing only about the last 0.61 metres (2.0 ft) of the tail and front legs. Both scapulae and coracoids are preserved in position, but the rest of the front legs are gone (except for phalanges and pieces of the humeri, ulnae, and radii). Apparently, the remaining front legs were weathered or eroded away. Impressions of the integument were preserved covering over a large part of the skeleton's outlining and shows the form of the body. Another specimen, AMNH 5338, was found in 1914 by Brown and Peter Kaisen. Both specimens are now housed in the American Museum of Natural History in their original death poses.

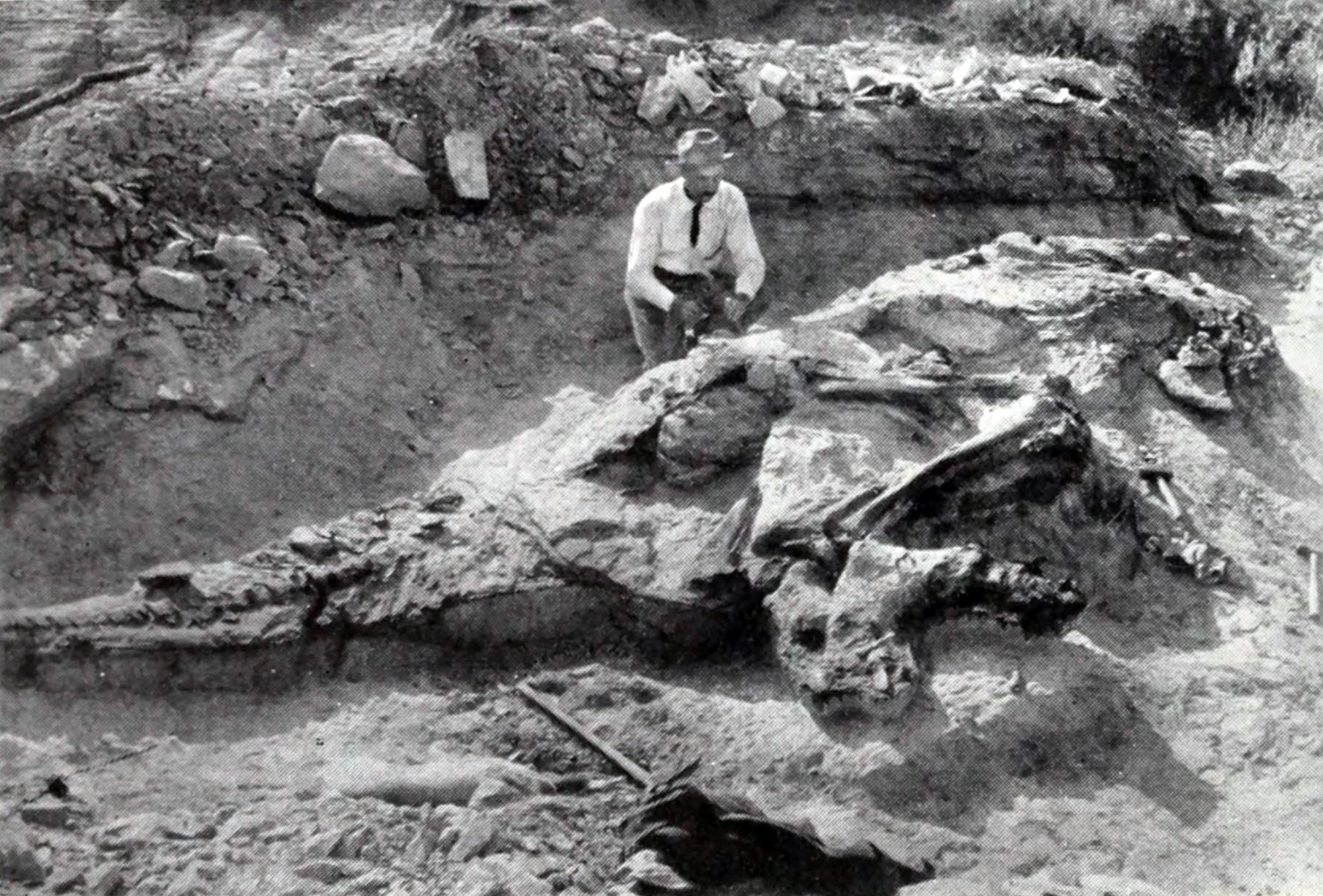
Excavation of the holotype specimen of C. casuarius by the Red Deer River

The type species, Corythosaurus casuarius, was named by Barnum Brown in 1914, based on the first specimen collected by him in 1912. AMNH 5240 is thus the holotype. In 1916, the original author, Brown, published a more detailed description that was also based on AMNH 5338, which is therefore the plesiotype. Corythosaurus is among many lambeosaurines that possess crests and it was the crest that lends Corythosaurus its name. The generic name Corythosaurus is derived from the Greek κόρυθος,(korythos), "Corinthian helmet", and means "helmeted lizard". The specific name, casuarius, refers to the cassowary, a bird with a similar skull crest. The full binomial of Corythosaurus casuarius thus means "Cassowary-like reptile, with a Corinthian helmet crest".

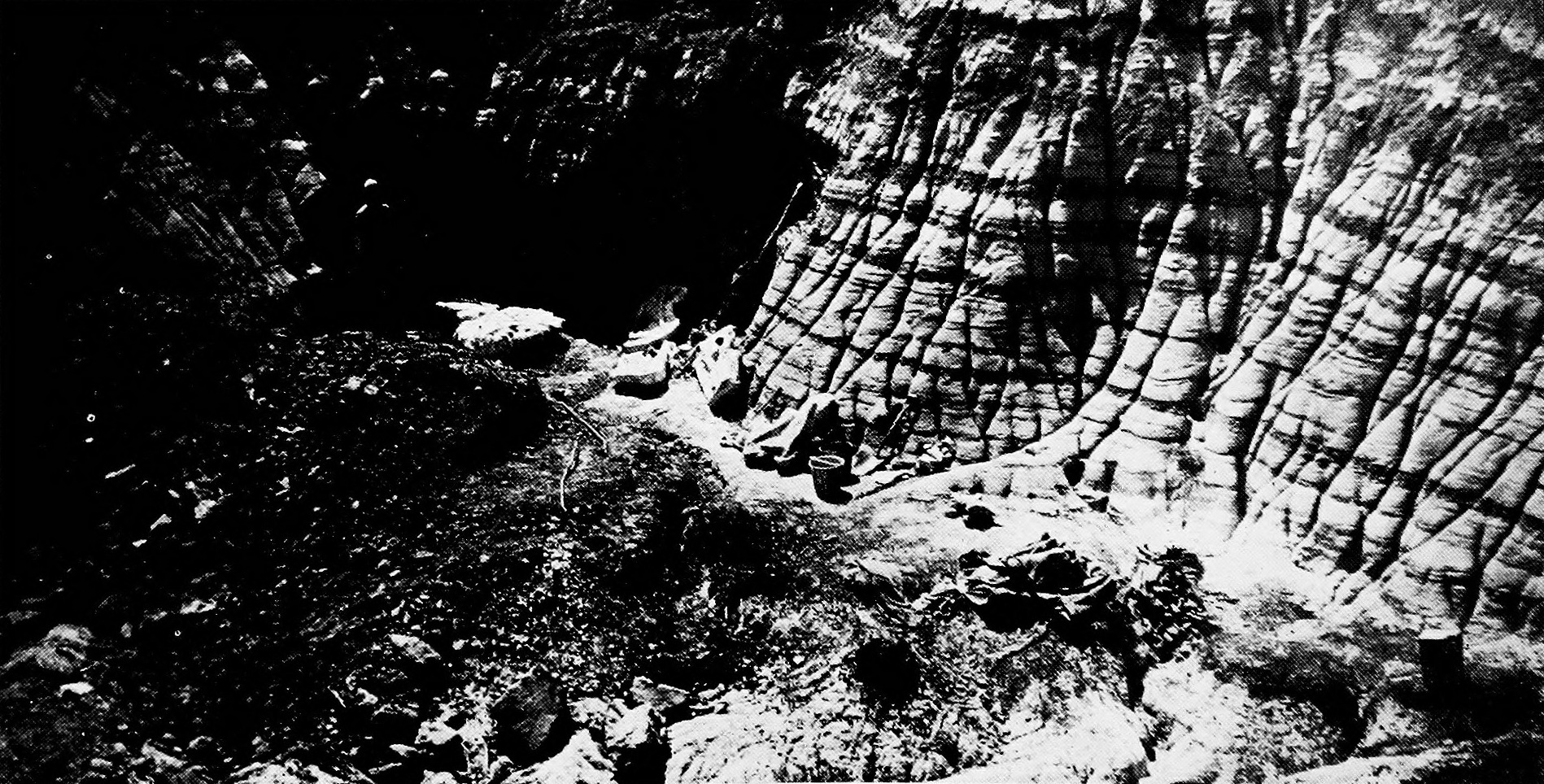
Quarry with one of the specimens lost at sea in 1916

The two best preserved specimens of Corythosaurus, found by Charles H. Sternberg in 1912, were lost on December 6, 1916, while being carried by the SS Mount Temple to the United Kingdom during World War I. They were being sent to Arthur Smith Woodward, a paleontologist of the British Museum of Natural History in England, when the ship transporting them was sunk by the German merchant raider SMS Möwe in the middle of the ocean.

There were formerly up to seven species described, including C. casuarius, C. bicristatus (Parks 1935), C. brevicristatus (Parks 1935), C. excavatus (Gilmore 1923), C. frontalis (Parks 1935), and C. intermedius (Parks 1923). In 1975, Peter Dodson studied the differences between the skulls and crests of different species of lambeosaurine dinosaurs. He found that the differences in size and shape may have actually been related to the sex and age of the animal. Only one species is currently recognized for certain, C. casuarius, although C. intermedius has been recognized as valid in some studies. It is based on specimen ROM 776, a skull found by Levi Sternberg in 1920, was named by William Parks in 1923. Originally, he named it Stephanosaurus intermedius earlier that year. The specific name of C. intermedius is derived from its apparent intermediate position according to Parks. C. intermedius lived at a slightly later time in the Campanian than C. casuarius and the two species are not identical, which supported the separation of them in a 2009 study. The invalid species, C. excavatus (specimen UALVP 13), was based on only a skull found in 1920 and wouldn't be reunited with the rest of its remains until 2012.

== Description ==
=== Size ===
Size of C. casuarius (left, red) and C. intermedius (right, yellow) compared to a human.

Benson et al. (2012) estimated that Corythosaurus has an average length of 9 metres (30 ft). In 1962, Edwin H. Colbert used models of specific dinosaurs, including Corythosaurus, to estimate their weight. The Corythosaurus model used was modelled by Vincent Fusco, after a mounted skeleton, and supervised by Barnum Brown. After testing, it was concluded that the average weight of Corythosaurus was 3.82 tonnes (3.76 long tons; 4.21 short tons). The total length of Corythosaurus specimen AMNH 5240 was found to be 8.1 m (27 ft) long, with a weight close to 3.1 tonnes (3.0510 long tons; 3.4172 short tons). In 2016, Gregory S. Paul estimated that C. casuarius reached 8 metres (26 ft) long and 2.8 metric tons (3.1 short tons) in weight and that C. intermedius reached 7.7 metres (25 ft) in length and 2.5 metric tons (2.8 short tons) in weight. A "morphologically adult-sized specimen" of C. casuarius measured approximately 9 metres (30 ft) long.

Proportionally, the skull is much shorter and smaller than that of Edmontosaurus (formerly Trachodon), Kritosaurus, or Saurolophus. But, when including its crest, its superficial area is almost as large.

=== Skull ===
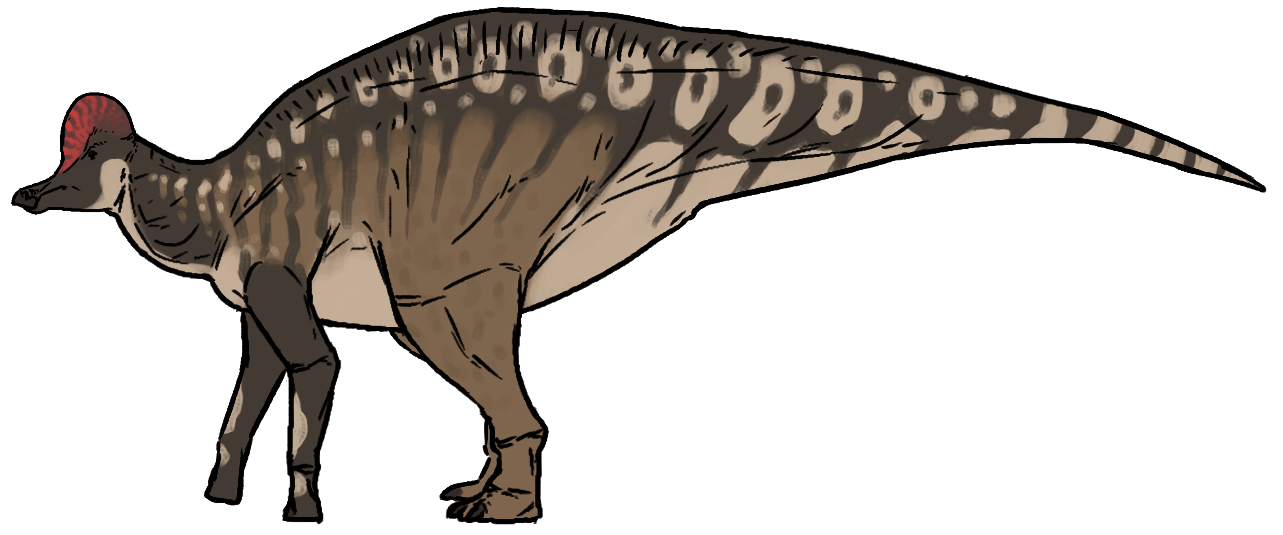
Life restoration of C. casuarius

Over twenty skulls have been found from this dinosaur. As with other lambeosaurines, the animal bore a tall, elaborate, bony crest atop its skull that contained the elongate narial passages. The narial passages extended into the crest, first into separate pockets in the sides, then into a single central chamber, and onward into the respiratory system. The skull of the type specimen has no dermal impressions on it. During preservation, it was compressed laterally and the width is now about two-thirds of what it would have been in real life. According to Brown, the compression also caused the nasals to shift where they pressed down on the premaxillaries. Because they were pressed on the premaxillaries, the nasals would have closed the nares. Apart from the compression, the skull appears to be normal. Contrary to what Brown assumed, the areas concerned were fully part of the praemaxillae.

As aforementioned, the crests of Corythosaurus resemble that of a cassowary or a Corinthian helmet. They are formed by a combination of the praemaxillae, nasals, prefrontals, and frontals, as in Saurolophus, but instead of projecting backwards as a spine, they rise up to make the highest point above the orbit. The two halves of the crest are separated by a median suture. In front of the orbit, the crest is made of thick bone.

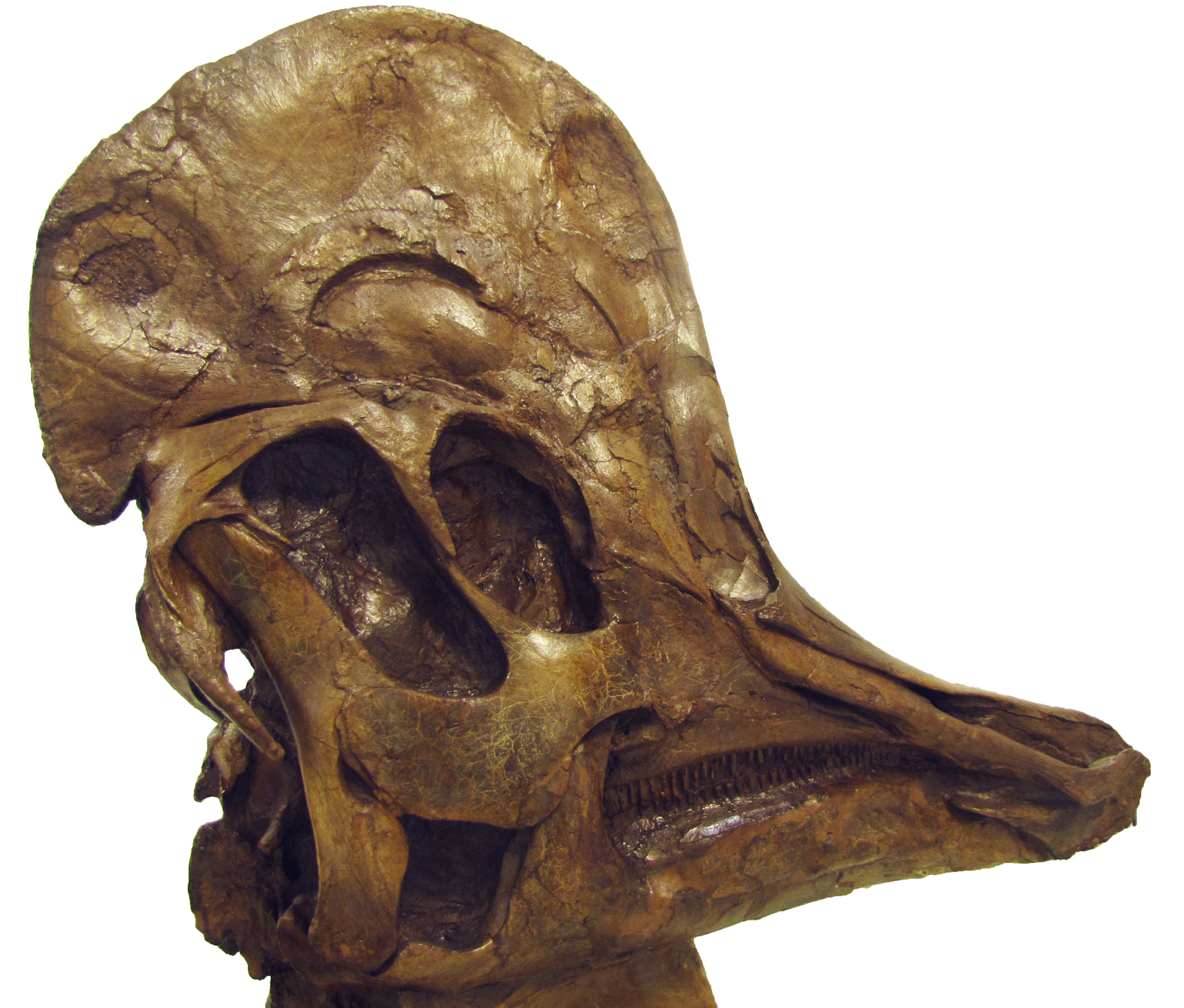
Skull of the type specimen

The nasals make up most of the crest. Brown assumed that they extended from the beaks' tip to the highest spot along the crest and that, unlike those in other genera, the nasals meet in the center and are not separated in front by an ascending premaxillary process. However, Brown mistook the praemaxillae for the nasals. The snout is actually largely formed by them and they do separate the nasals. Brown also thought that, on the top and back of the crest, the whole external face is covered by the frontals. Again he made a mistake, as what he assumed to be the frontals are in fact the nasals. The nasals end at the back of the squamosals in a hooked, short process. The prefrontals also make up part of the crest. However, Brown mistook the lower upper branch of the praemaxilla for the prefrontal. The actual prefrontal, which is triangular in shape, is located at the side of the crest base. It was seen by Brown as a part of the frontal. The real frontals, which are largely internal to the crest base structure, are not visible from the side.

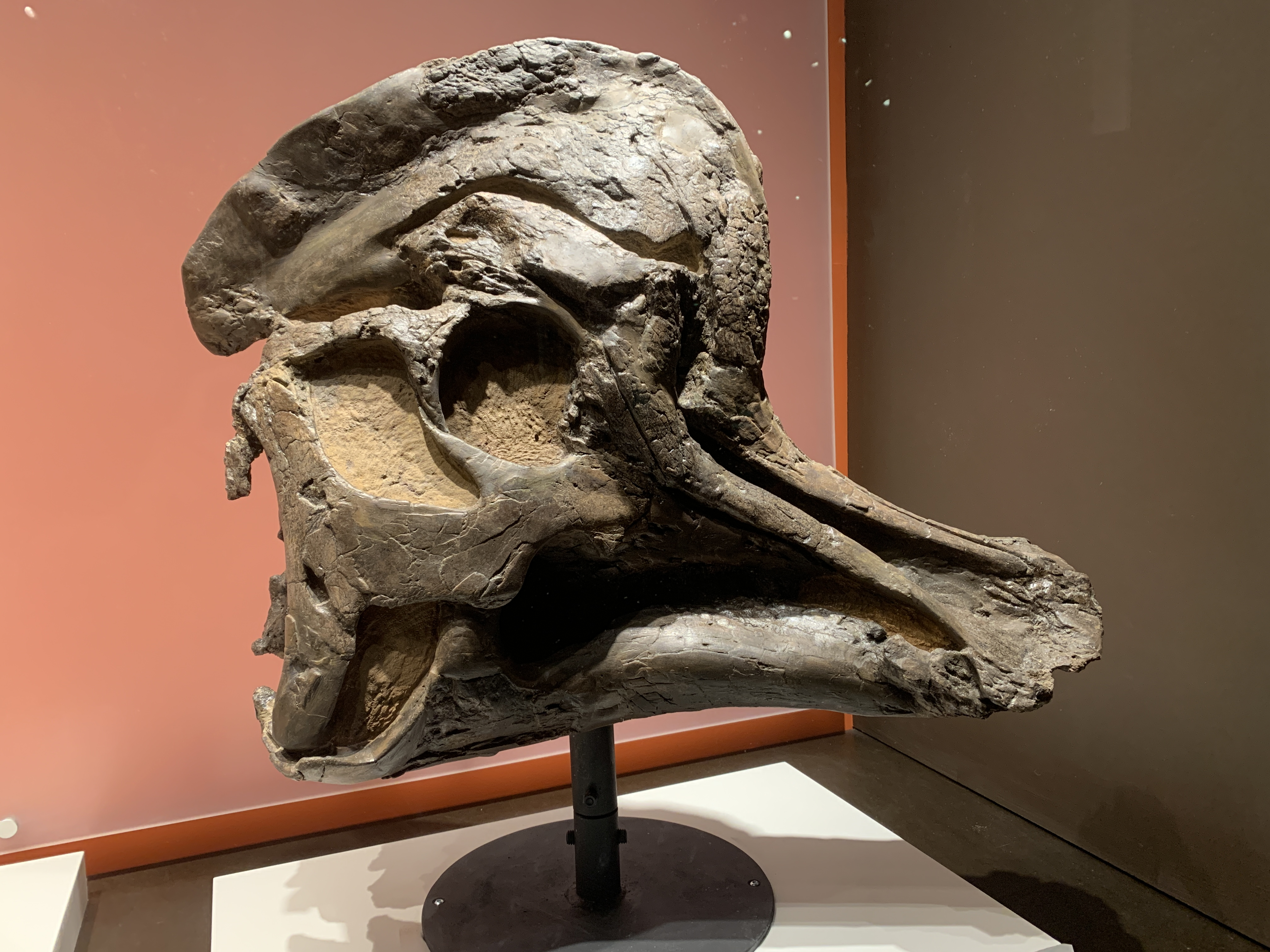
Skull of TMP 1984.121.0001

The mouth of the holotype of Corythosaurus is narrow. The praemaxillae each form two long folds that enclose air passages extending the narial passages to the front of the snout. There, they end in narrow openings, sometimes called "pseudonares", which are false bony nostrils. These were mistaken by Brown for the real nares or nostrils. These are actually situated inside the crest, above the eye sockets. As in Saurolophus, the expanded portion of the premaxillary in front of the pseudonaris' opening is elongate. By comparison, the bill of Kritosaurus is short and the pseudonares extend far forward. At the end of the Corythosaurus bill, the two pseudonares unite into one. Because of his incorrect identification, Brown assumed that the holotype's inferior process of the premaxillary was shorter than in Kritosaurus and Saurolophus and that the process does not unite with the lacrimal, which is another difference from those genera. The praemaxilla actually does touch the lacrimal and extends to the rear until well behind the eye socket.

The lower jaw of the holotype is 66.9 centimetres (26.3 in) long and 10 centimetres (3.9 in) deep. The total length of the crest from the beak to the uppermost tip of the type specimen is 83.7 centimetres (33.0 in), its total length is 81.2 centimetres (32.0 in), and its height is 70.8 centimetres (27.9 in).

=== Soft tissue ===
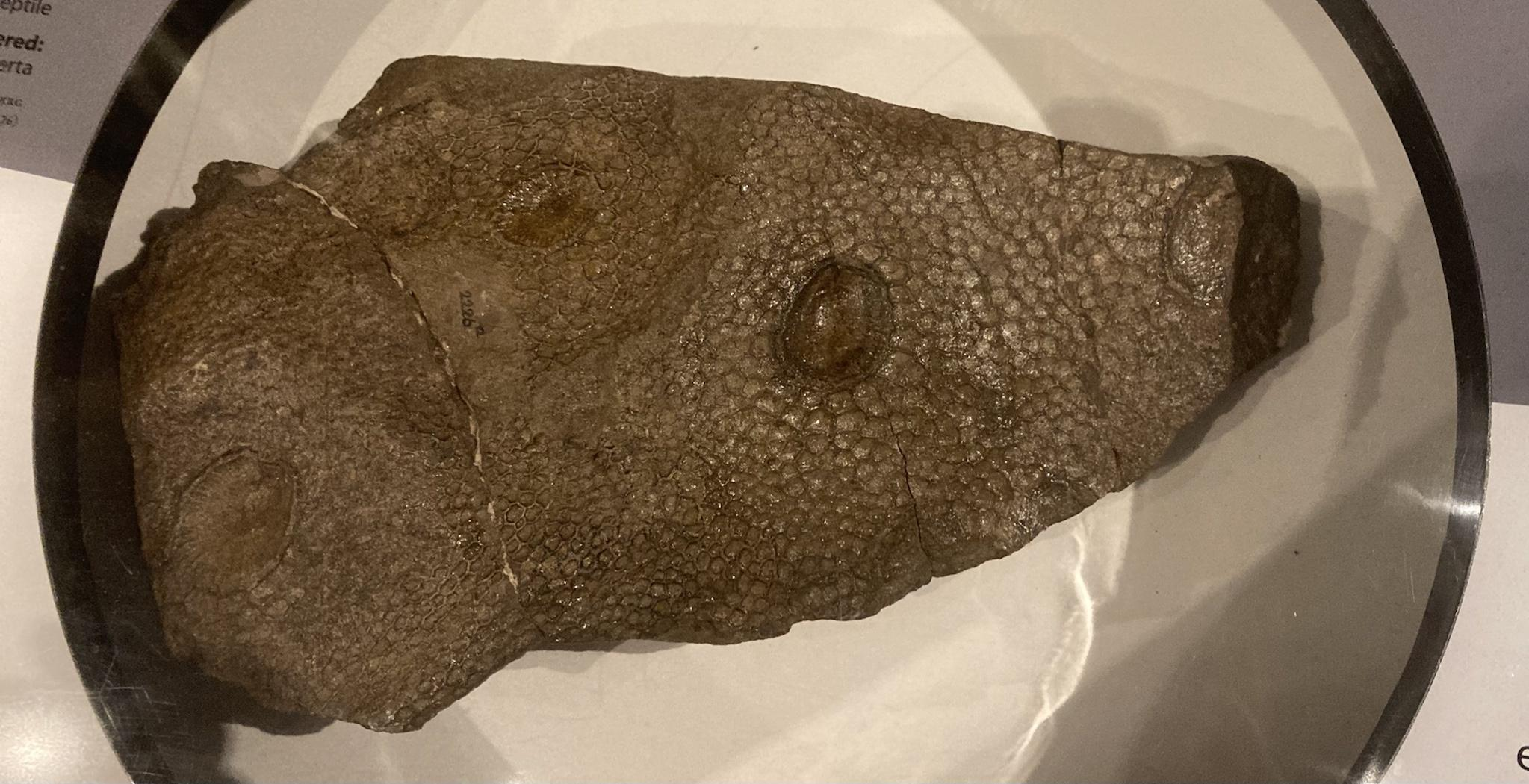
Replica of skin impressions

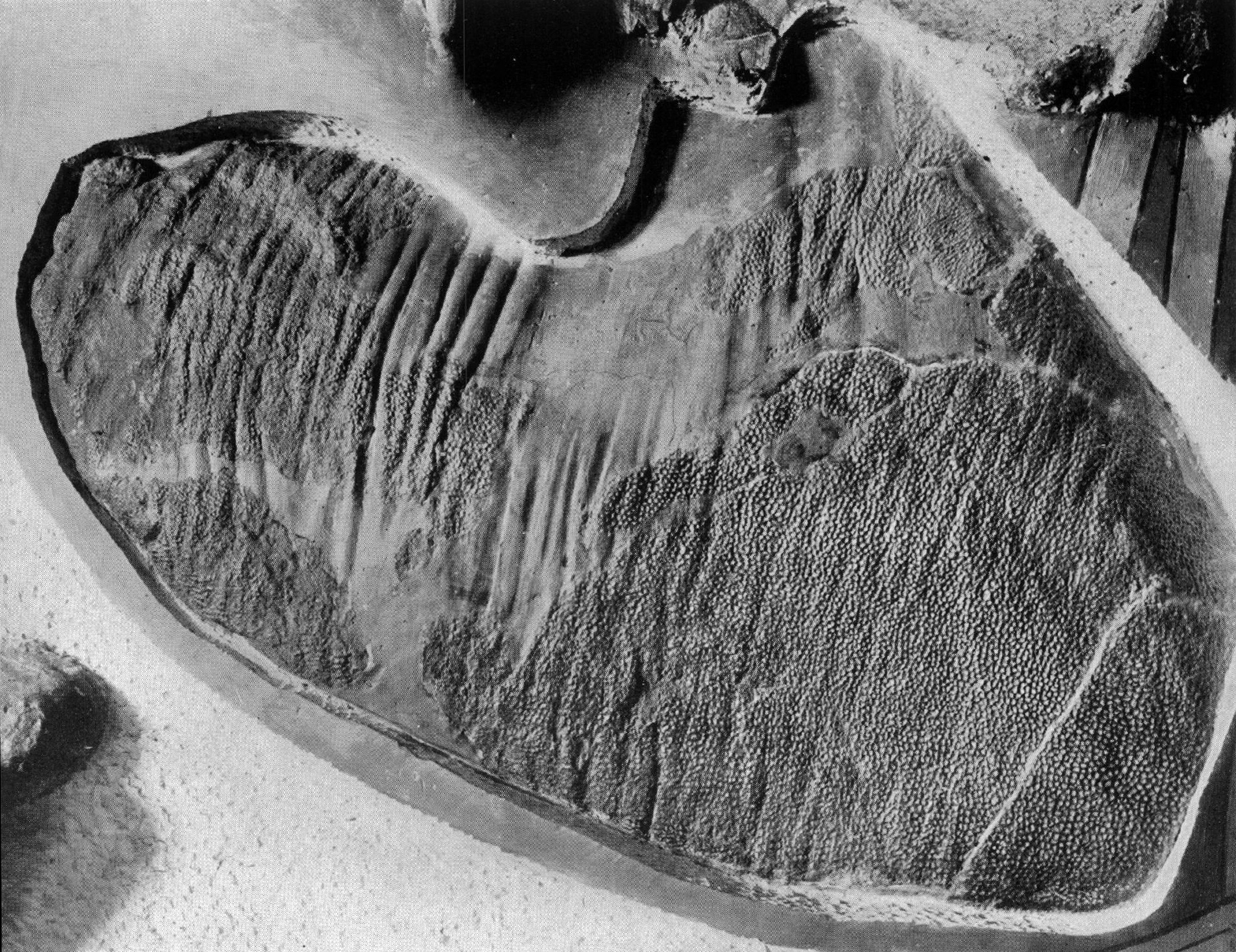
Abdominal skin impressions from Brown (1916)

In the holotype of C. casuarius, the sides and tail are covered in scales of several types. Polygonal tuberculate scales, covered in small bumps, vary in size across the body. Conical limpet-like scales are preserved only on a fold of skin preserved on the back of the tibia, but this was probably from the bottom of the belly instead of the leg. Separating the polygonal scales of C. casuarius are shieldlike scales, arranged close together in rows. Ossified tendons are present on all the vertebrae, except for those in the cervical region. On no vertebrae do the tendons extend below the transverse processes. Each tendon is flattened at its origin, transversely ovoid in the central rod, and ends at a rounded point.

Aside from those found on Corythosaurus casuarius, extensive skin impressions have been found on Edmontosaurus annectens and notable integument has also been found on Brachylophosaurus canadensis, Gryposaurus notabilis, Parasaurolophus walkeri, Lambeosaurus magnicristatus, L. lambei, Saurolophus angustirsotris, and on unidentified ornithopods. Of these, L. lambei, C. casuarius, G. notabilis, P. walkeri, and S. angustirsotris have preserved polygonal scales. The scales on L. lambei, S. angustirostris, and C. casuarius are all similar. Corythosaurus is one of very few hadrosaurids which have preserved skin impressions on the hind limbs and feet. A study in 2013 showed that, amongst hadrosaurids, Saurolophus angustirostris preserved the best and most complete foot and limb integument, although other species like S. osborni, Edmontosaurus annectens, and Lambeosaurus lambei (= L. clavinitialis) share a fair amount of preserved tissue on those regions.

It was once thought that this dinosaur lived mostly in the water, due to the appearance of webbed hands and feet. However, it was later discovered that the so-called "webs" were in fact deflated padding, much like that found on many modern mammals.

=== Distinguishing characteristics ===
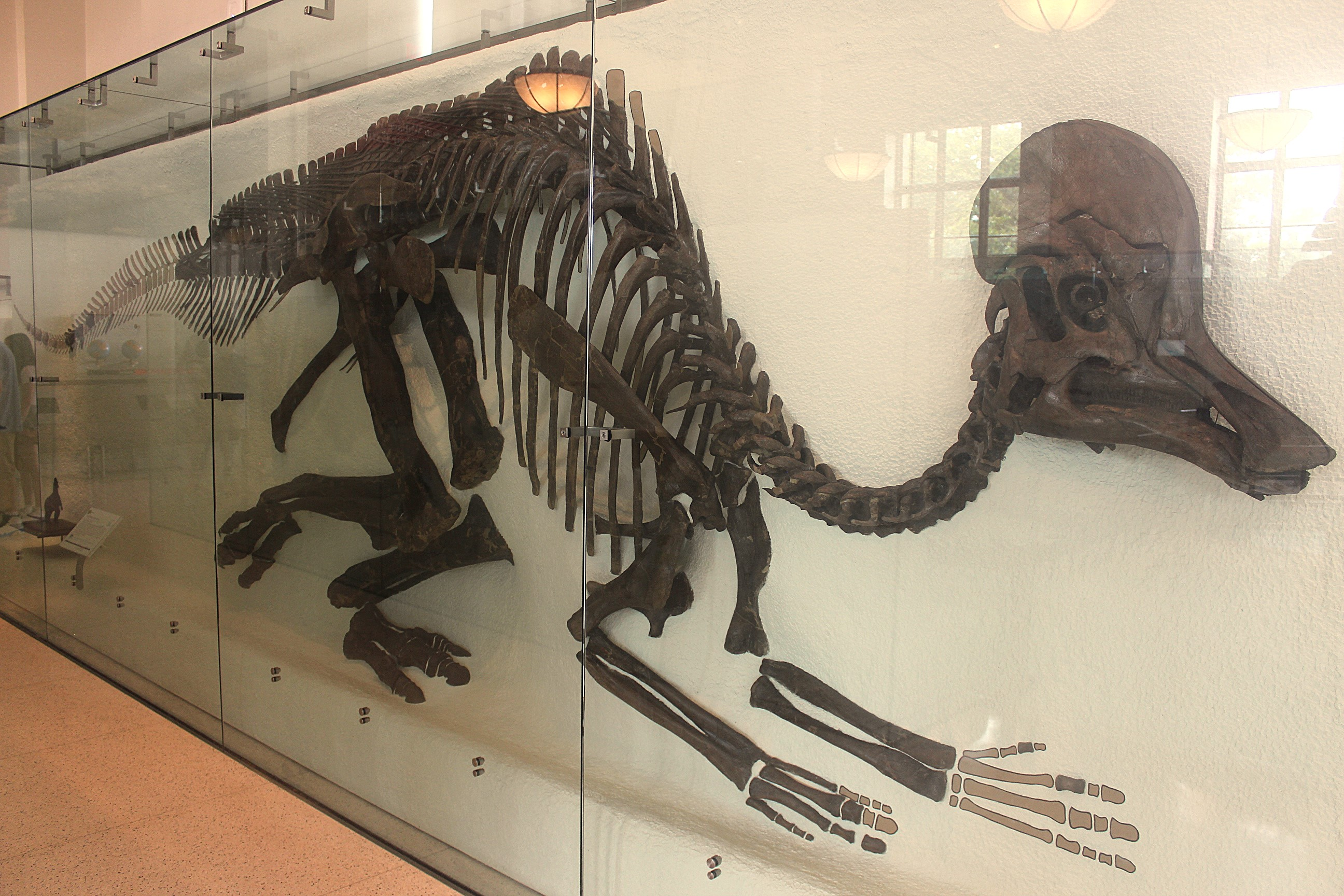
Skeleton at AMNH

A set of characters were indicated by Barnum Brown in 1914 to distinguish Corythosaurus from all other hadrosaurids from Alberta. These include a comparatively short skull with a high helmet-like crest formed by the nasals, prefrontals, and frontals; the nasals not being separated in front by the premaxillaries; a narrow beak with an expansion in front of an elongated naris; and a small narial opening.

In 1916, Brown expanded the character set to include even more features. In the revised version, these extra features include a comparatively short skull with a high helmet-like crest formed by nasals, prefrontals, and frontals; the nasals not being separated in front by premaxillaries; a narrow beak; expanded section in front of the elongated nares; a small narial opening; a vertebral formula of 15 cervicals, 19 dorsals, 8 sacrals, and 61+ caudals; possession of dorsal spines of a medium height; high anterior caudal spines; long chevrons; long scapulae that possess a blade of medium width; a radius considerably longer than the humerus; comparatively short metacarpals, an anteriorly decurved ilium; a long ischium with a foot-like terminal expansion; a pubis with an anterior blade that is short and broadly expanded at the end; a femur that is longer than the tibia; the phalanges of pes are short; that the integument over the sides and tail composed of polygonal tuberculate scales without pattern, but graded in size in different parts of the body; and a belly with longitudinal rows of large conical limpet-like scales separated by uniformly large polygonal tubercles. Again, the presumed traits of the snout are incorrect because Brown confused the praemaxillae with the nasal bones and the nasal bones with the frontals. Most of the postcranial traits are today known to be shared with various other lambeosaurines.

== Classification ==
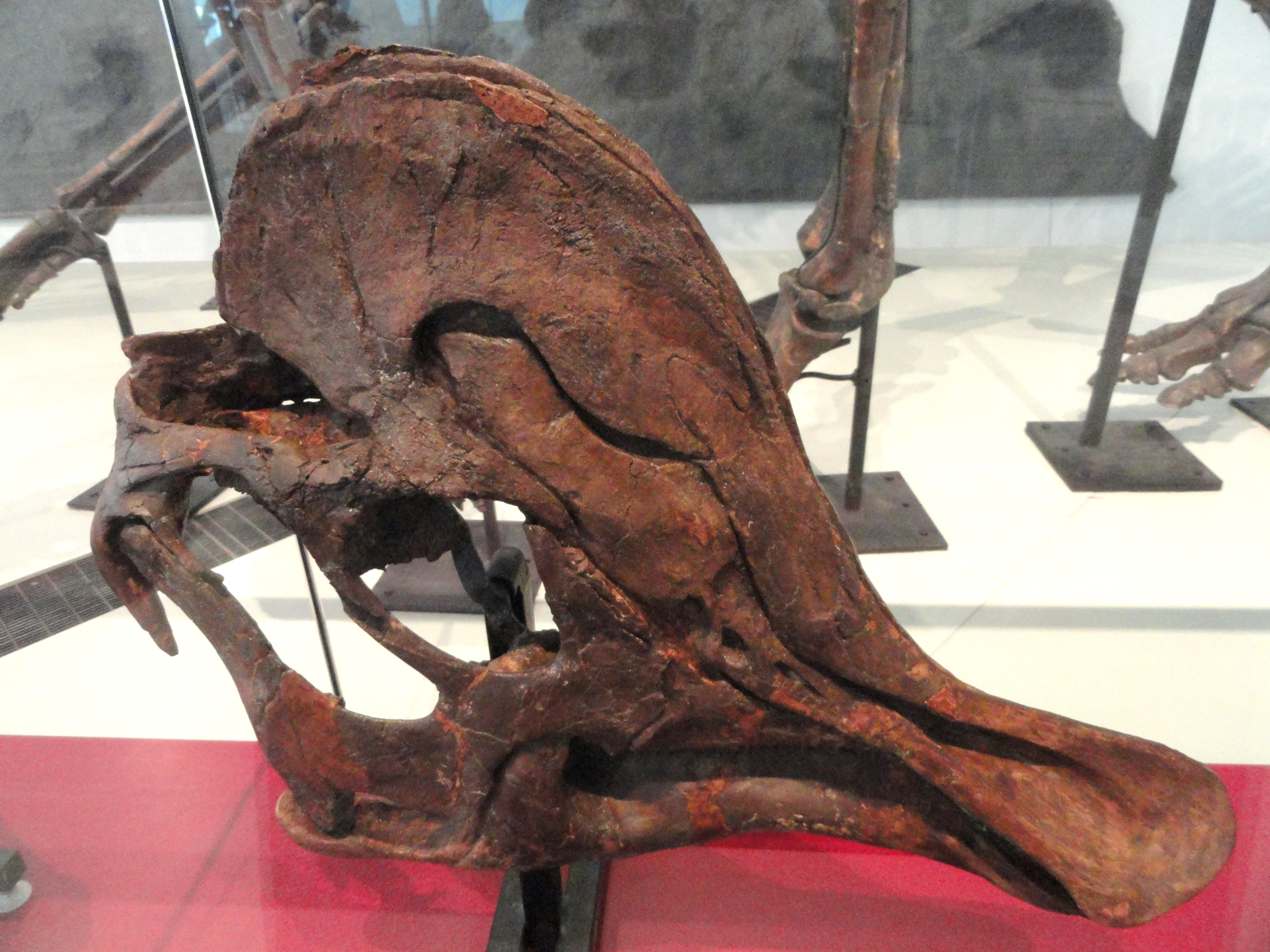
ROM 870, the skull of a subadult, originally named as a separate species, C. brevicristatus

Originally, Brown referred to Corythosaurus as a member of the family Trachodontidae (now Hadrosauridae). Inside Trachodontidae were the subfamilies Trachodontinae and Saurolophinae. Brown classified Hadrosaurus, Trachodon, Claosaurus, and Kritosaurus in Trachodontinae, whereas he classified Corythosaurus, Stephanosaurus, and Saurolophus in Saurolophinae.

Later, Brown revised the phylogeny of Corythosaurus, finding that it was closely related and possibly ancestral to Hypacrosaurus. The only differences he found between them were the development of the vertebrae and the proportions of the legs. During a study of dinosaurian ilia in the 1920s, Alfred Sherwood Romer proposed that the two orders of dinosaurs might have evolved separately and that birds, based on the shape and proportions of their ilia, might truly be specialized ornithischians. He used both Tyrannosaurus and Corythosaurus as a base model to analyze which theory is more likely true. He found that, even though birds are thought of as saurischians, it is very plausible for them to have evolved their specific pelvic musculature and anatomy if they evolved from ornithschians like Corythosaurus. However, even though the pelvic structure of Corythosaurus and other ornithischians does bear a greater superficial resemblance to birds than the saurischian pelvis does, birds are now known to be highly derived maniraptoran theropods.

Corythosaurus is currently classified as a hadrosaurid in the subfamily Lambeosaurinae. It is related to other hadrosaurs such as Hypacrosaurus, Lambeosaurus, and Olorotitan. With the exception of Olorotitan, they all share similar looking skulls and crests. However, research published in 2003 has suggested that even though it possesses a unique crest, Olorotitan is Corythosaurus's closest known relative. Benson et al. (2012) found that Corythosaurus was closely related to Velafrons, Nipponosaurus, and Hypacrosaurus, with them forming a group of fan-crested lambeosaurines.

In 2014, a study including the description of Zhanghenglong was published in the journal PLOS ONE. The study included an almost complete cladogram of hadrosauroid relationships, including Corythosaurus as the most derived lambeosaurine and being the sister taxon to Hypacrosaurus. The below cladogram is a simplified version including only Lambeosaurini.

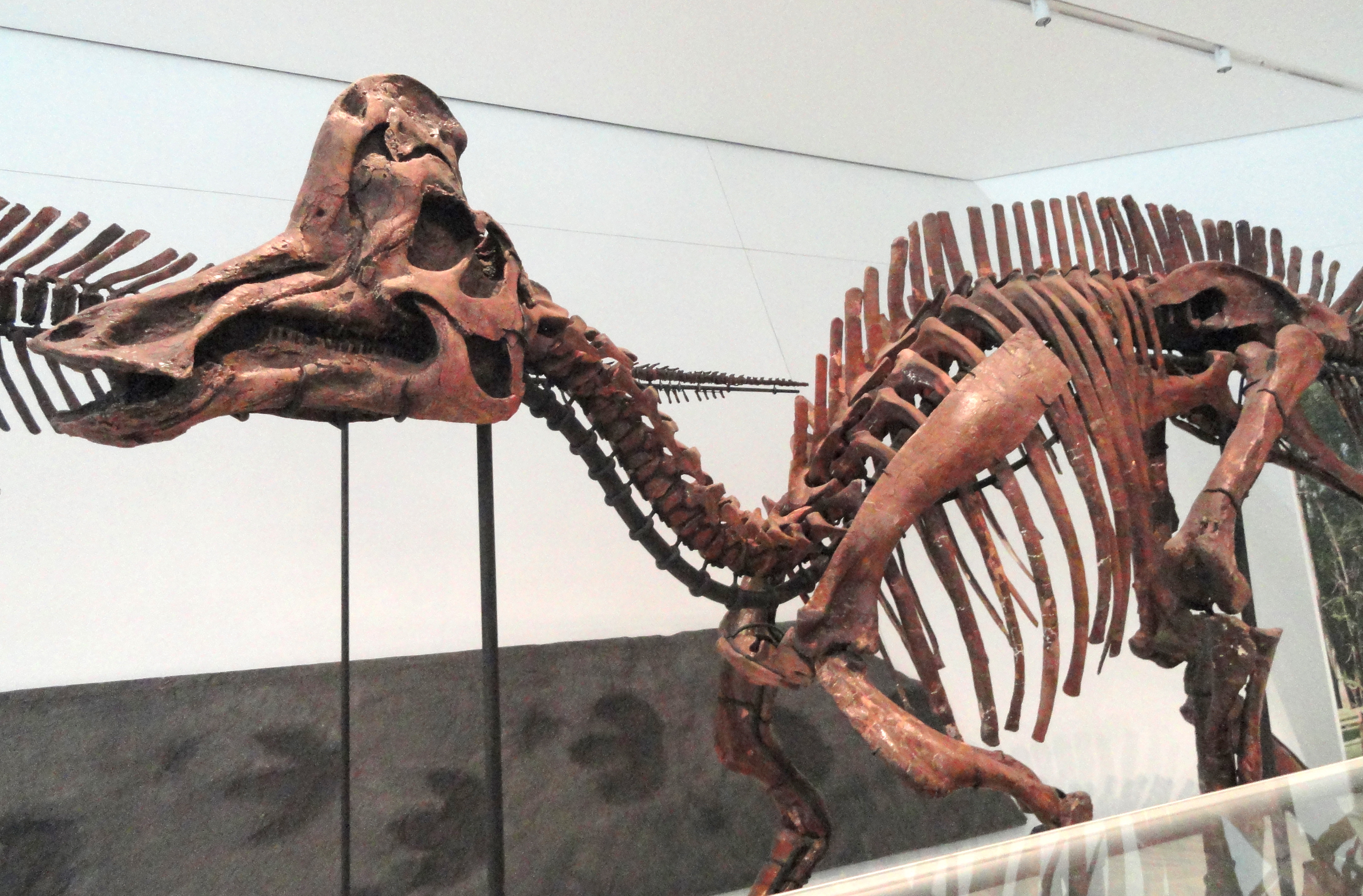
ROM 845, mounted skeleton of Corythosaurus cf. intermedius cf. excavatus Parks 1935 at the Royal Ontario Museum

- Lambeosaurini
  - Arenysaurus
  - - - Sahaliyania
      - Amurosaurus
    - - Lambeosaurus
        - Lambeosaurus magnicristatus
        - Lambeosaurus lambei
      - - Magnapaulia
        - - Velafrons
          - Olorotitan
          - Nipponosaurus
          - - Hypacrosaurus
              - Hypacrosaurus altispinus
              - Hypacrosaurus stebingeri
            - Corythosaurus
              - Corythosaurus casuarius
              - Corythosaurus intermedius

== Paleobiology ==
Comparisons between the scleral rings of Corythosaurus and modern reptiles suggest that it may have been cathemeral, meaning it was most active throughout the day at short intervals. The sense of hearing in hadrosaurids, specifically such as Lophorhothon, also seems to have been greatly developed because of an elongated lagena. The presence of a thin stapes (an ear bone that is rod-like in reptiles), combined with a large eardrum, implies the existence of a sensitive middle ear. It is possible that hadrosaurid ears are sensitive enough to detect as much sound as a modern crocodilian.

=== Crest function ===
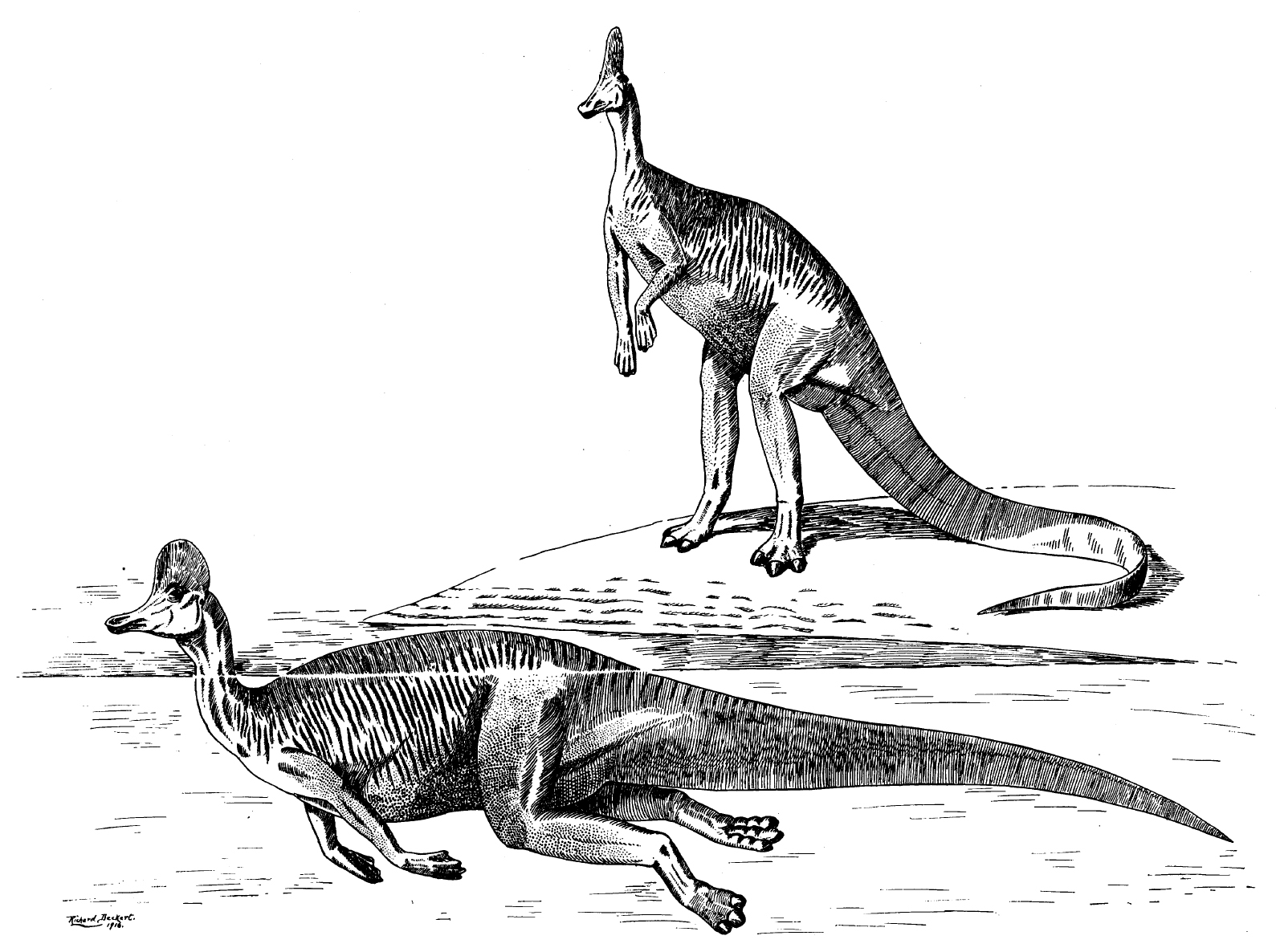
Outdated 1916 restoration showing C. casuarius as semi-aquatic

The internal structures of the crest of Corythosaurus are quite complex, making possible a call that could be used as a warning or for attracting a mate. Nasal passageways of Corythosaurus, as well as Hypacrosaurus and Lambeosaurus, are S-shaped, with Parasaurolophus only possessing U-shaped tubes. Any vocalization would travel through these elaborate chambers and probably get amplified. Scientists speculate that Corythosaurus could make loud, low pitched cries "like a wind or brass instrument", such as a trombone. The sounds could serve to alert other Corythosaurus to the presence of food or a potential threat from a predator. The nasal passages emit low-frequency sounds when Corythosaurus exhaled. The individual crests would produce different sounds, so it is likely that each species of lambeosaurine would have had a unique sound. However, even though the range for different lambeosaurine nasal passages vary greatly, they all probably made low-pitched sounds. This might be because low sounds (below 400 Hz) travel a set distance in any environment, while higher sounds (above 400 Hz) have a larger spread in the distance travelled.

When they were first described, crested hadrosaurs were thought to be aquatic, an assessment based incorrectly on webbing that is now known to be padding. The theory was that the animals could swim deep in the water and use the crest to store air to breathe. However, it has now been proven that the crest did not have any holes in the end and the water pressure at even 3 metres (9.8 ft) would be too great for the lungs to be able to inflate.

=== Growth ===
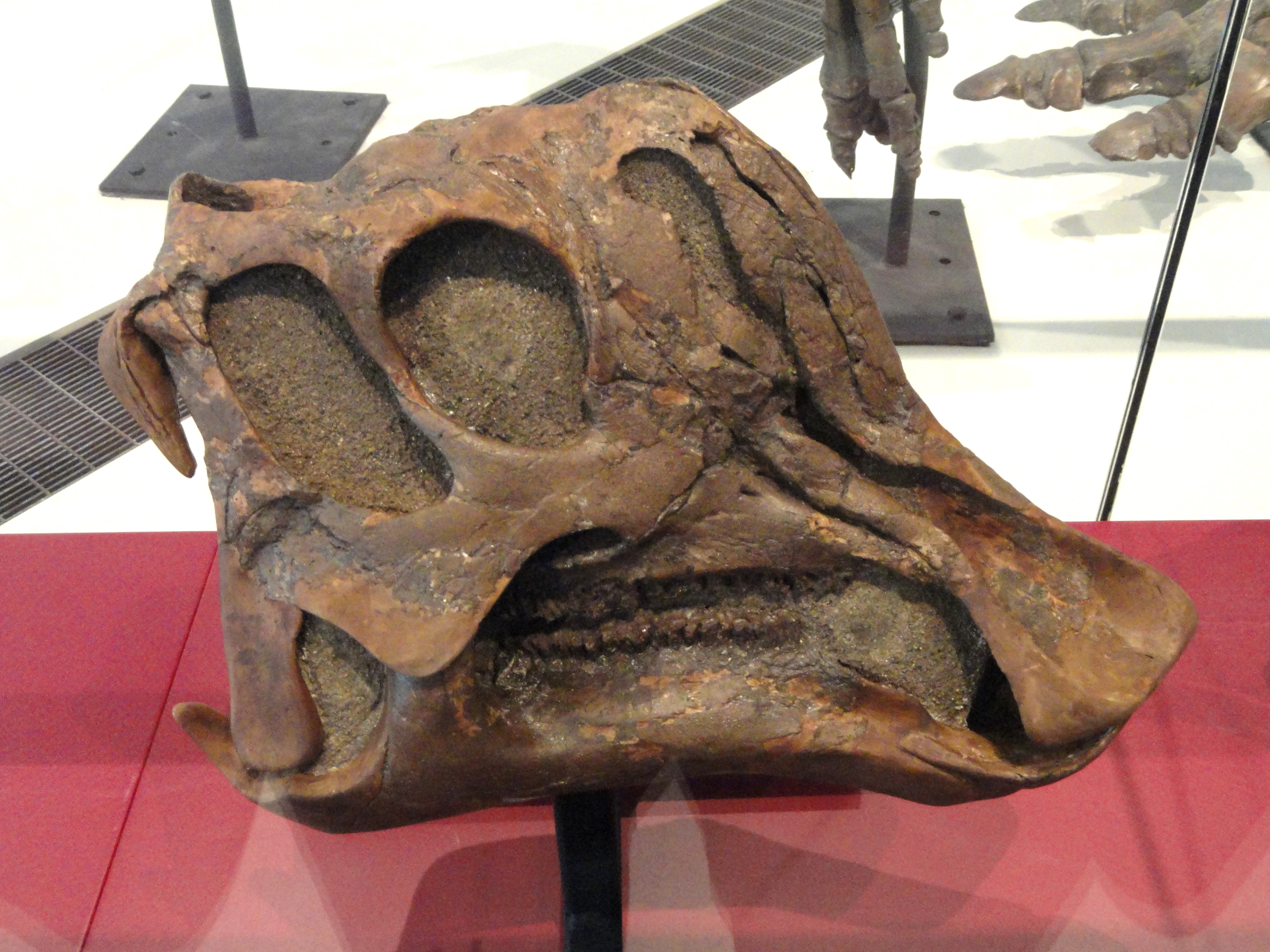
ROM 759, a juvenile skull, originally named as a separate species, Tetragonosaurus erectofrons

Corythosaurus casuarius is one of a few lambeosaurines, along with Lambeosaurus lambei, Hypacrosaurus stebingeri, and H. altispinus, to have had surviving fossilized juveniles assigned to it. Juveniles are harder to assign to species because, at a young age, they lack the distinctive larger crests of adults. As they age, lambeosaurine crests tend to grow and become more prominent come maturity. In the Dinosaur Park Formation, over fifty articulated specimens have been found that come from many different genera. Among them, juveniles are hard to identify at the species level. Earlier, four genera and thirteen species were recognized from the formation's area when paleontologists used differences in size and crest shape to differentiate taxa. The smallest specimens were identified as Tetragonosaurus, now seen as a synonym of Procheneosaurus, and the largest skeletons were called either Corythosaurus or Lambeosaurus. An adult was even identified as Parasaurolophus. Small lambeosaurines from the Horseshoe Canyon Formation were referred to Cheneosaurus.

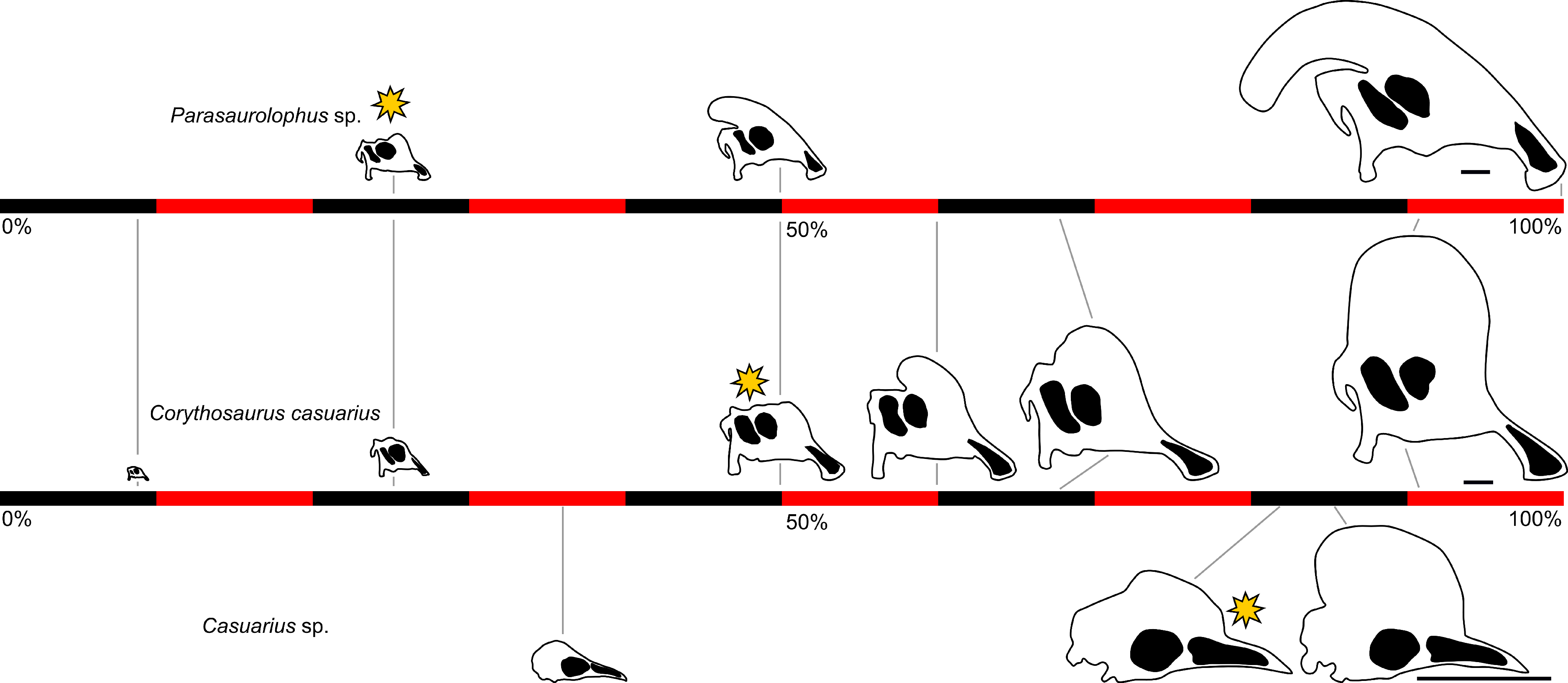
Skull growth of Parasaurolophus sp., Corythosaurus casuarius and Casuarius sp. The stars represent the age at which crest development starts

Corythosaurus started developing its crest when they were half the size of adults, but Parasaurolophus juveniles grew crests when they were only 25% as long as adults. Juvenile Corythosaurus, along with adults, had a premaxilla-nasal fontanelle. Young and adult Corythosaurus are similar to Lambeosaurus and Hypacrosaurus, but dissimilar to Parasaurolophus in that the sutures of the skull are sinuous, not smooth and straight. This feature helps to differentiate Parasaurolophini from Lambeosaurini. Generally, the crests of juveniles of lambeosaurines like Corythosaurus, Lambeosaurus, Hypacrosaurus stebingeri, parasaurolophines like Parasaurolophus, and primitive lambeosaurines like Kazaklambia are quite alike, although other features can be used to distinguish them.

Work by Dodson (1975) recognized that there were many less taxa present in Alberta. Tetragonosaurus was found to be juveniles of Corythosaurus or Lambeosaurus. T. erectofrons was assigned to Corythosaurus based largely on biometric information. The only non-typic specimen of Tetragonosaurus, assigned to T. erectofrons, was later found to be referable to Hypacrosaurus, although the holotype of the species was still found to be assignable to Corythosaurus.

=== Diet ===
Corythosaurus was an ornithopod, therefore being a herbivore. Benson et al. (2012) realized that the beak of Corythosaurus was shallow and delicate, concluding that it must have been used to feed upon soft vegetation. Based on the climate of the Late Cretaceous, they guessed that Corythosaurus would have been a selective feeder, eating only the juiciest fruits and youngest leaves. A Corythosaurus specimen has been preserved with its last meal in its chest cavity. Inside the cavity were remains of conifer needles, seeds, twigs, and fruits, meaning that Corythosaurus probably fed on all of these, implying that it was a browser.

== Paleoecology ==
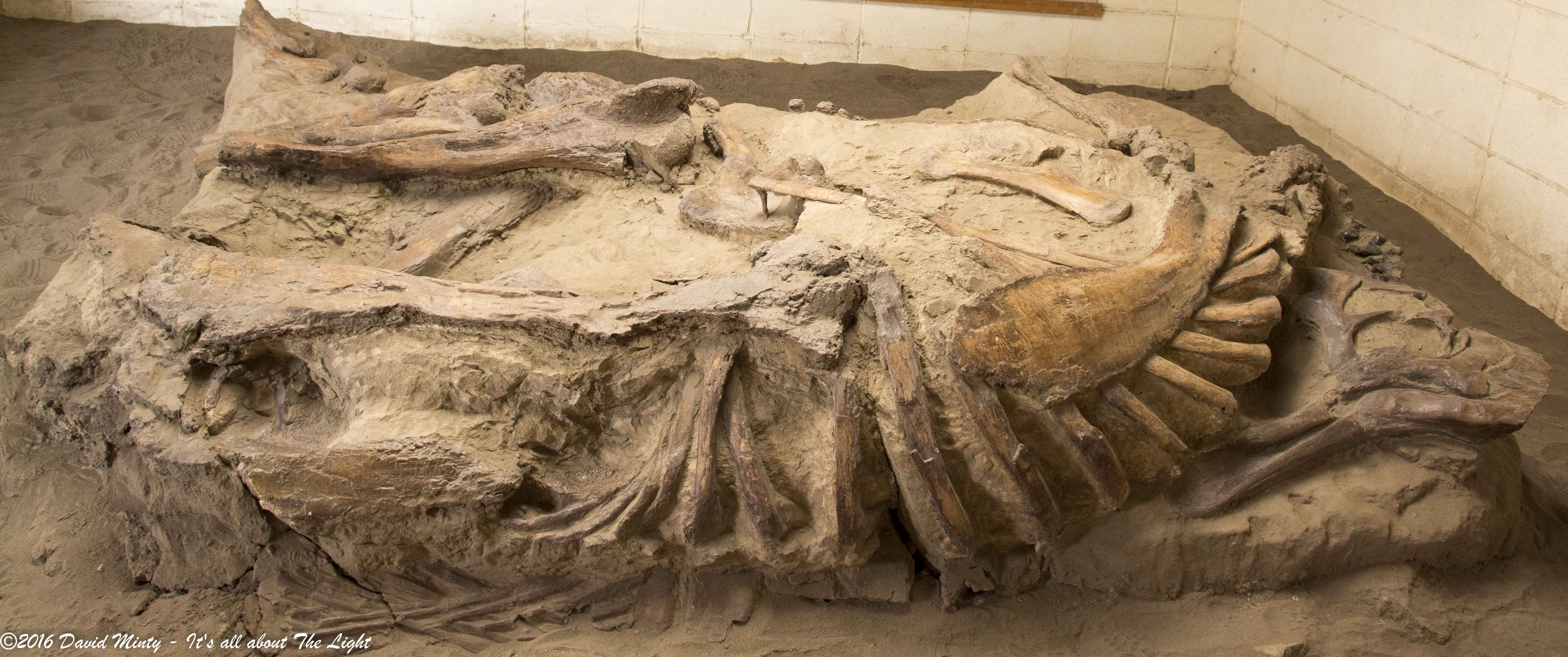
Skeleton from Dinosaur Provincial Park

Fossils have been found in the upper Oldman Formation and lower Dinosaur Park Formation of Canada. The Oldman Formation dates to the Campanian, about 77.5 to 76.5 million years ago, and the Dinosaur Park Formation dates from 76.6 to 74.8 million years ago. Corythosaurus lived from ~77–75.7 million years ago. In the Dinosaur Park Formation, C. casuarius lived from 76.6 to 75.9 mya, with C. intermedius living from 75.8 to 75.7 mya. In the Oldman Formation, C. casuarius, the only species of Corythosaurus from the deposits, lived about 77 to 76.5 mya. The holotype specimen was clearly a carcass that had floated up on a beach, as Unio shells, water-worn bones, and a baenid turtle were preserved all around it. Corythosaurus probably lived in a woodland forest and might have occasionally wandered into swampy areas.

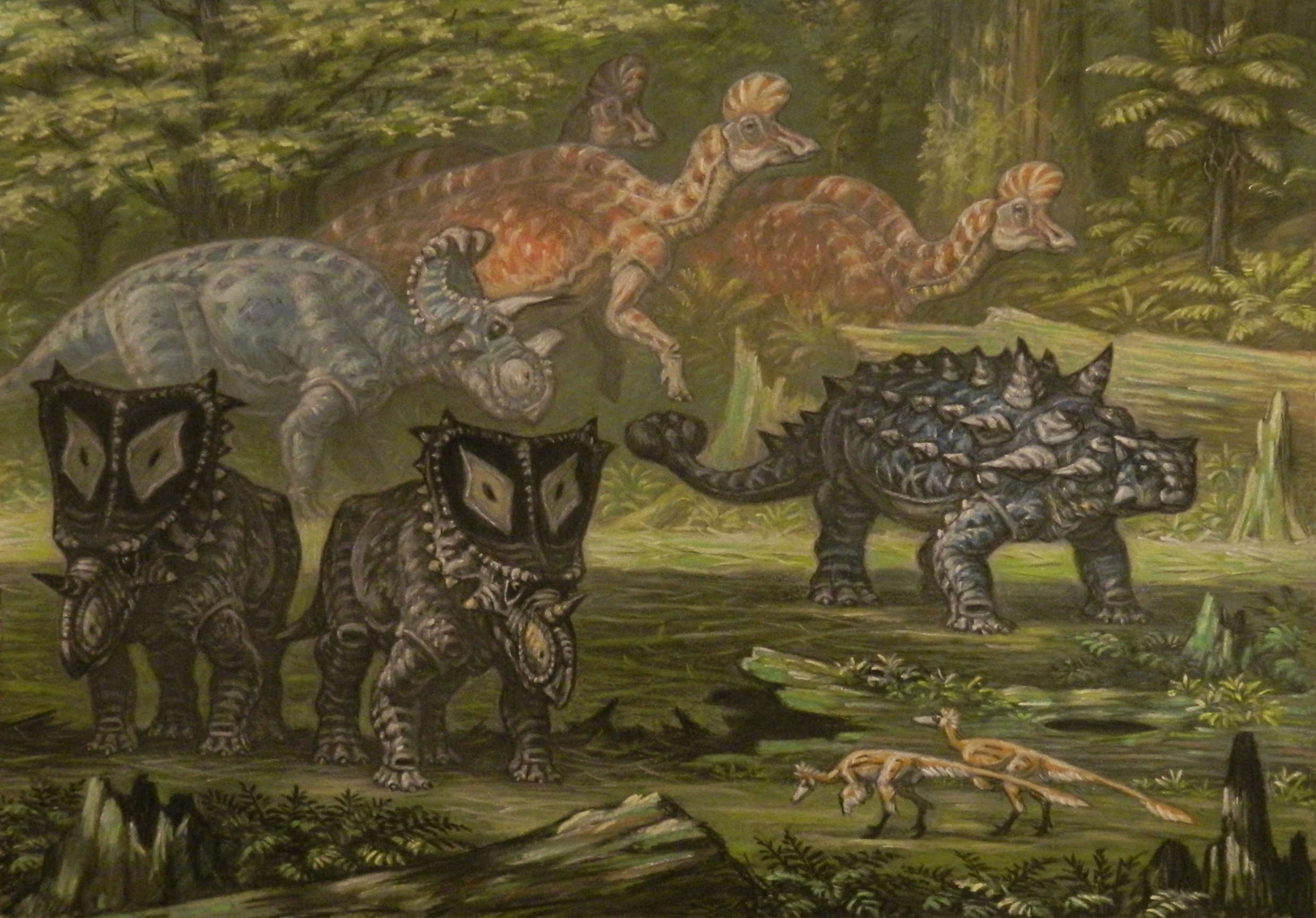
Herbivores of the Oldman Formation, Corythosaurus in the background

A limited fauna is known from the upper section of the Oldman Formation and Corythosaurus casuarius, as well as C. intermedius, are among the taxa. Also from the section of the formation are the theropods Daspletosaurus and Saurornitholestes, the hadrosaurids Brachylophosaurus, Gryposaurus, and Parasaurolophus, the ankylosaurid Scolosaurus, and the ceratopsians Coronosaurus and Chasmosaurus. Other genera are known, but do not persist from the upper section of the formation, therefore not being contemporaries of Corythosaurus.

Corythosaurus casuarius is widespread throughout the lower unit of the Dinosaur Park Formation. In it, Corythosaurus was found to be closely associated with the ceratopsid Centrosaurus apertus. Their associating was found in the Dinosaur Park, Judith River, and Mesaverde formations, as well as the Wind River Basin and the Wheatland County area. Corythosaurus lived alongside numerous other giant herbivores, such as the hadrosaurids Gryposaurus and Parasaurolophus, the ceratopsids Centrosaurus and Chasmosaurus, and the ankylosaurids Scolosaurus, Edmontonia, and Dyoplosaurus in the earliest stages of the formation, Dyoplosaurus, Panoplosaurus, and Euoplocephalus in the middle age, and Euoplocephalus alone in later stages of the formation. Studies of the jaw anatomy and mechanics of these dinosaurs suggests they probably all occupied slightly different ecological niches in order to avoid direct competition for food in such a crowded eco-space. The only large predators known from the same levels of the formation as Corythosaurus are the tyrannosaurids Gorgosaurus libratus and an unnamed species of Daspletosaurus.

Thomas M. Lehman has observed that Corythosaurus hasn't been discovered outside of southern Alberta, even though it is one of the most abundant Judithian dinosaurs in the region. Large herbivores like the hadrosaurs living in North America during the Late Cretaceous had "remarkably small geographic ranges" despite their large body size and high mobility. This restricted distribution strongly contrasts with modern mammalian faunas whose large herbivores' ranges "typical[ly] ... span much of a continent."

== See also ==
- Timeline of hadrosaur research
