= Kundar =

Kundar may refer to:

- Kundar River, in Afghanistan and Pakistan
- Flag of Afghanistan

Iran

- Kundar, alternate spelling of Kondor, Lorestan
- Kundar, alternate spelling of Kondor, Qazvin
- Kundar, alternate spelling of Kondor, Razavi Khorasan
- Kundar, alternate spelling of Kondor, Birjand, South Khorasan
- Kundar, alternate spelling of Kondor, Nehbandan, South Khorasan

== See also ==
- Kundur (disambiguation)
- Kundra (disambiguation)
