= Kunduru =

Kunduru (Telugu: కుందూరు) is a Telugu surname. Notable people with the surname include:

- Kunduru Jana Reddy (born 1982), Indian politician
- Kunduru Jayaveer Reddy (born 1980), Indian politician
- Kunduru Nagarjuna Reddy (born 1981), Indian politician
- Kunduru Raghuveer (born 1946), Indian politician
