= Jiayin =

Jiayin may refer to:

- Jiayin County in Heilongjiang, China
- Wood Tiger (Chinese Zodiac), one of the terms in the Sexagenary cycle
- The Tiger (political magazine) (甲寅; Jiǎyín), 1910s Chinese magazine
- Jiayin, town in Honghe County, Yunnan, China

== People ==
- Lei Jiayin, Chinese actor
- Liu Jiayin, Chinese filmmaker
- Jiang Jiayin, Chinese basketball player
- Xu Jiayin, Chinese billionaire and criminal
