= Kundera =

Kundera is a Czech surname. Notable people with the surname include:

- Ludvík Kundera (1920–2010), Czech writer and translator, cousin of Milan Kundera
- Ludvík Kundera (musicologist) (1891–1971), Czech musicologist and pianist who was head of the Janáček Academy of Music and Performing Arts, father of Milan Kundera
- Milan Kundera (1929–2023), Czech writer
- Rudolf Kundera (1911–2005), Czech-French painter

== See also ==
- Lena Kundera and Bianca Montgomery, fictional characters
- 7390 Kundera, asteroid
- Kundra (disambiguation), an unrelated Indian surname
