= Deepa Kundur =

Canadian engineer

- Born: Toronto, Ontario, Canada

Academic background
- Education: BSc, 1993, MSc, 1995, PhD, 1999, electrical and computer engineering, University of Toronto
- Website: www.comm.utoronto.ca/dkundur/

Deepa Kundur is a Canadian engineer and academic leader. She is Professor and Chair of The Edward S. Rogers Sr. Department of Electrical and Computer Engineering at the University of Toronto and holds a Tier 1 Canada Research Chair in Cybersecurity of Intelligent Critical Infrastructure. Her research focuses on cybersecurity of critical infrastructure, with emphasis on energy and transportation systems, as well as data-centric approaches in digital psychiatry. She is a Fellow of the Institute of Electrical and Electronics Engineers, a Fellow of the Canadian Academy of Engineering, a Fellow of the Engineering Institute of Canada and a Senior Fellow of Massey College.

== Early life and education ==
Kundur was born and raised in Toronto, Canada. She received her Bachelor of Applied Science (B.A.Sc.), Master of Applied Science (M.A.Sc.), and Doctor of Philosophy (Ph.D.) degrees in electrical and computer engineering from the University of Toronto in 1993, 1995, and 1999, respectively.

== Career ==
Following completion of her Ph.D., Kundur joined the University of Toronto’s Department of Electrical and Computer Engineering as an assistant professor. In 2003, she accepted a faculty position at Texas A&M University before returning to the University of Toronto in 2012 as a full professor.

From 2014 to 2016, she served as Associate Chair of the Division of Engineering Science at the University of Toronto. Her research during this period focused on the application of mathematical tools from signal processing, applied cryptography, graph theory, and dynamical systems to problems in cybersecurity and infrastructure resilience. Following the 2015 cyberattack on Ukraine’s power grid, she collaborated with colleagues to co-develop algorithms designed to detect anomalous behaviour in power systems and mitigate cyber-physical threats.

In 2017, Kundur was appointed Chair of the Division of Engineering Science. During her first year in this role, she oversaw the establishment of Canada’s first undergraduate engineering major in Machine Intelligence. In 2024, she was appointed a Tier 1 Canada Research Chair in Cybersecurity of Intelligent Critical Infrastructure.

Kundur has held numerous leadership roles in IEEE- and ACM-sponsored conferences and workshops, serving as general chair, symposium chair, and technical program committee co-chair for events focused on smart grids, cybersecurity, signal processing, and resilient energy systems.

Her research has received best paper recognitions at multiple international venues, including the IEEE Smart Grid Communications Conference, the IEEE Electrical Power and Energy Conference, the IEEE Canadian Conference on Electrical and Computer Engineering, the Cyber Security and Information Intelligence Research Workshop, and the IEEE INFOCOM Workshop on Mission Critical Networks. She has also received teaching awards at both the University of Toronto and Texas A&M University.

== Personal life ==
Kundur is the daughter of the late Prabha Shankar Kundur, a power systems engineer and member of the U.S. National Academy of Engineering, best known for authoring Power System Stability and Control.
