= František Kundra =

Slovak footballer

Personal information
- Full name: František Kundra
- Date of birth: 2 May 1980 (age 46)
- Place of birth: Bardejov, Czechoslovakia
- Height: 1.80 m (5 ft 11 in)
- Position: Midfielder

Youth career
- JAS Bardejov

Senior career*
Years	Team	Apps	(Gls)
1998–2001	Bardejov	9	(0)
2001–2003	FK Čaňa		
2003–2004	Ruch Chorzów	13	(1)
2003–2004	Rimavská Sobota		
2004–2007	Dunajská Streda	56	(7)
2007–2008	Humenné		
2008–2009	Bardejov		
2008–2009	KSZO Ostrowiec	9	(0)
2009–2013	Bardejov		
2013–2015	FK Gerlachov		
- * Club domestic league appearances and goals

František Kundra (born 2 May 1980) is a Slovak former professional footballer who played as a midfielder. His former club was Partizán Bardejov.

== Honours ==
KSZO Ostrowiec Świętokrzyski

- II liga East: 2008–09
