= Kundur, Russia =

Kundur Кундур
- Selo
- Location within Amur Oblast Location within Russia
- Coordinates: 49°06′N 130°45′E
- Country: Russia
- Region: Amur Oblast
- District: Arkharinsky District
- Time zone: UTC+9:00

Kundur (Russian: Кундур) is a rural locality (a selo) and the administrative center of Kundursky Selsoviet of Arkharinsky District, Amur Oblast, Russia. The population was 693 as of 2018. There are 27 streets.

== Geography ==
Kundur is located on the Trans-Siberian Railway, 75 km southeast of Arkhara (the district's administrative centre) by road. Tonnelny is the nearest rural locality.
