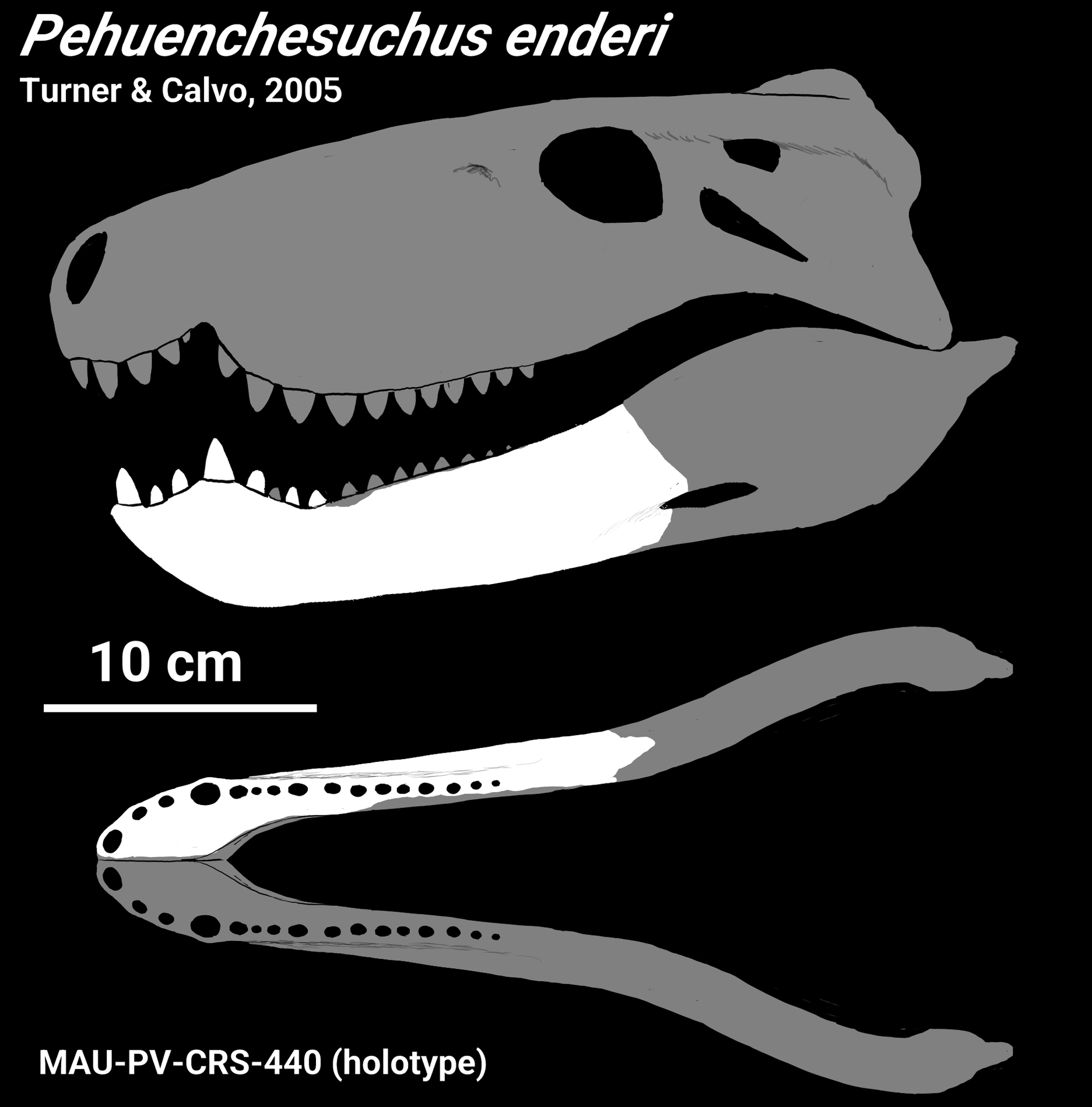
- Skull diagram of Pehuenchesuchus (known bones in white)

Scientific classification
- Kingdom: Animalia
- Phylum: Chordata
- Class: Reptilia
- Clade: Archosauria
- Clade: Pseudosuchia
- Clade: Crocodylomorpha
- Clade: †Notosuchia
- Clade: †Sebecosuchia
- Genus: †Pehuenchesuchus; Turner & Calvo, 2005

Type species
- †Pehuenchesuchus enderi Turner & Calvo, 2005

= Pehuenchesuchus =

Pehuenchesuchus Temporal range: Turonian-Coniacian ~85 Ma

Extinct genus of reptiles

Pehuenchesuchus (meaning "Pehuenche crocodile", after the Mapuche name for the region in which it was found) is an extinct genus of sebecosuchian mesoeucrocodylian. It was discovered in rocks of the late Turonian-Coniacian-age Upper Cretaceous Río Neuquén Formation (Neuquén Group, near Rincón de los Sauces, Neuquén, Argentina.

== Description ==
Pehuenchesaurus was described in 2005 by Alan Turner and Jorge Calvo based on MAU-PV-CRS-440, a nearly complete dentary (the main tooth-bearing bone of the lower jaw). This animal had a narrow, tall lower jaw, and differed from all other sebecosuchians by lacking serrations on its teeth. The first and fourth teeth were the largest, and the first tooth pointed forward slightly. The preserved jaw bone is about 210 millimetres (8.3 in) long. Turner and Calvo found their new genus to be the basalmost sebecosuchian. The type species is P. enderi, named for Ender Wiggin, a character in Orson Scott Card's works.
