= Kaijutitan =

Kaijutitan Temporal range: Late Cretaceous, Coniacian 89–86 Ma

Scientific classification
- Domain: Eukaryota
- Kingdom: Animalia
- Phylum: Chordata
- Clade: Dinosauria
- Clade: Saurischia
- Clade: †Sauropodomorpha
- Clade: †Sauropoda
- Clade: †Macronaria
- Clade: †Titanosauria
- Genus: †Kaijutitan; Filippi, Salgado & Garrido, 2019

Type species
- †Kaijutitan maui Filippi, Salgado & Garrido, 2019

Genus of titanosaurian dinosaur from the Late Cretaceous period

Kaijutitan (meaning "Kaiju titan" after the type of Japanese movie monsters) is a genus of basal titanosaur dinosaur from the Sierra Barrosa Formation from Neuquén Province in Argentina. The type and only species is Kaijutitan maui.

== Discovery and naming ==
Kaijutitan was discovered by a team of researchers from the Museo Municipal Argentino Urquiza and the Museo Provincial de Ciencias Naturales “Prof. Dr. Juan Olsacher" from a layer from the Sierra Barrosa Formation, in Cañadón Mistringa, about 9 km southwest of the city of Rincón de los Sauces, in Neuquen, Argentina.

== Description ==
Kaijutitan is known from the holotype MAU-Pv-CM-522, stored at the Museo Municipal Argentino Urquiza, Paleontología de Vertebrados, Cañadón Mistringa, which is a partial skeleton preserving elements from several parts of the skeleton.

It can be distinguished from other titanosaurians through the possession of unique traits: the width between the basal tuberosities is almost four times the width of the foramen magnum; the foramen for the internal carotid artery is located on the back of the basipterygoid, almost at the middle of the distance between the basipterygoid and the basal tuberosities; the anterior cervical vertebrae have bifid neural spines; a medial tuber located behind both metapophyses on both cervical vertebrae; a spinopostzygapophyseal lamina bifurcated in the spinal sector, generating elongated deep pneumatic cavities on anterior cervical vertebrae; a posteroventral keel on the anterior cervical vertebrae, generated from the convergence of two ridges that originate from the bottom edge of the parapophysis; an accessory lamina that runs from postzygadiapophyseal lamina up to the spinoprezygapophyseal lamina in cervical vertebra; absence of proximal pneumatopores in dorsal ribs; the prespinal lamina is triangular, which is a product of a dorsal expansion in anterior caudal vertebra; the absence of a ventromedial process in the bottom of the scapula; the tibial proximal condyle is narrow, with its long axis anteroposteriorly oriented; the tibial cnemial crest projects forward; and foramina at the base of the ascending process of the astragalus.

== Classification ==
To test the systematic position of Kaijutitan, a phylogenetic analysis was conducted to resolve its affinities. A simplified cladogram, showing the results of the analysis, is presented below.

- Titanosauria
  - - Andesaurus
    - Wintonotitan
  - - Kaijutitan
    - - Epachthosaurus
      - Eutitanosauria
