= Sierra Barrosa Formation =

Geologic formation of the Neuquén Basin in Patagonia

- Stratigraphic range: Mid-late Coniacian; ~88–86 Ma
- Type: Geological formation
- Unit of: Neuquén Group; Río Neuquén Subgroup
- Underlies: Plottier Formation
- Overlies: Los Bastos Formation
- Thickness: Up to 62 m (203 ft)

Lithology
- Primary: Mudstone
- Other: Sandstone

Location
- Coordinates: 38°52′10″S 68°51′20″W
- Approximate paleocoordinates: 42.8°S 48.4°W
- Region: Mendoza & Neuquén Provinces
- Country: Argentina
- Extent: Neuquén Basin

Type section
- Named for: Sierra Barrosa
- Named by: Garrido
- Year defined: 2010
- Sierra Barrosa Formation (Argentina)

The Sierra Barrosa Formation is a geologic formation of the Neuquén Basin in the northern Patagonian provinces of Mendoza and Neuquén. The formation dates to the Late Cretaceous, middle to late Coniacian, and belongs to the Río Neuquén Subgroup of the Neuquén Group. The formation overlies the Los Bastos Formation and is overlain by the Plottier Formation. As the underlying Los Bastos Formation, the Sierra Barrosa Formation comprises mudstones and sandstones deposited in a fluvial environment.

== Description ==
The formation was named by Garrido in 2010 as sandy unit conformably and transitionally overlying the Los Bastos Formation, which in turns overlies the Portezuelo Formation within which both units were formerly included. The formation in the same manner underlies the Plottier Formation, all belonging to the Río Neuquén Subgroup of the Neuquén Group in the Neuquén Basin. The unit now known as Sierra Barrosa Formation was included in the original definition by Herrero Ducloux (1938, 1939) as "Portezuelo Superior", as part of the "Portezuelo Beds" he described.

The type locality of the formation is located at the southern edge of the eponymous Sierra Barrosa, to the east of Cerro Challacó. The formation at its type section reaches a thickness of 62 metres (203 ft). The formation comprises fine-to-medium grained sandstones intercalated by thin levels of mudstones. The formation has similar lithological characteristics as the Portezuelo Formation and was deposited in a fluvial environment characterized by highly sinuous channels. Based on the stratigraphic relations with the overlying and underlying units, the age has been estimated to be middle to late Coniacian.

== Fossil content ==
=== Crocodylomorphs ===
Crocodylomorphs reported from the Sierra Barrosa Formation
Genus	Species	Presence	Material	Notes	Images
Comahuesuchus	C. bonapartei	Futalongko Quarry.	Partial right mandible (MUCPv 597).	A notosuchian, locality may being to the Portezuelo Formation.	

=== Dinosaurs ===
==== Ornithischians ====
Ornithischians reported from the Sierra Barrosa Formation
Genus	Species	Presence	Material	Notes	Images
Macrogryphosaurus	M. gondwanicus	Mari Menuco Lake.	Near-complete skeleton.	An elasmarian.	

==== Sauropods ====
Sauropods reported from the Sierra Barrosa Formation
Genus	Species	Presence	Material	Notes	Images
Kaijutitan	K. maui	Cañadón Mistringa.	Partial skeleton.	A titanosaur.	
Mendozasaurus	M. neguyelap	Arroyo Seco.	Partial skeleton and disarticulated bones.	A titanosaur.	

==== Theropods ====
Theropods reported from the Sierra Barrosa Formation
Genus	Species	Presence	Material	Notes	Images
Tetanurae indet.	Indeterminate	Cañadón Mistringa.	Proximal end of left tibia (MAU-PV-CM-653).	Classified as an indeterminate allosauroid based on the interpretation that megaraptorans, which bare resemblance to this specimen, represent carnosaurs.	
Maniraptora indet.	Indeterminate	Arroyo Seco.		A maniraptoran.	
Murusraptor	M. barrosaensis	Sierra Barrosa.	Partial skeleton (MCF-PVPH-411).	A megaraptorid.	

== See also ==
- List of dinosaur bearing rock formations
