= Los Bastos Formation =

Geologic formation in Argentina

- Stratigraphic range: Early-mid Coniacian; ~89.8–88 Ma
- Type: Geological formation
- Unit of: Neuquén Group; Río Neuquén Subgroup
- Underlies: Sierra Barrosa Formation
- Overlies: Portezuelo Formation
- Thickness: Up to 35 m (115 ft)

Lithology
- Primary: Mudstone
- Other: Sandstone

Location
- Coordinates: 38°50′20″S 68°47′05″W
- Approximate paleocoordinates: 42.3°S 49.0°W
- Region: Mendoza Province; Neuquén Province
- Country: Argentina
- Extent: Neuquén Basin

Type section
- Named for: Los Bastos Field
- Named by: 2010
- Year defined: Garrido
- Los Bastos Formation (Argentina)

Los Bastos Formation is a geologic formation of the Neuquén Basin in the northern Patagonian provinces of Mendoza and Neuquén. The formation dates to the Late Cretaceous, early to middle Coniacian, and belongs to the Río Neuquén Subgroup of the Neuquén Group. The formation overlies the Portezuelo Formation, in which it was formerly included and is overlain by the Sierra Barrosa Formation. Los Bastos Formation comprises mudstones and sandstones deposited in a fluvial environment. A meridiolestid mammal were recovered from the formation.

== Description ==
The formation was named by Garrido in 2010 as shaly unit conformably and transitionally overlying the Portezuelo Formation, to which the layers were formerly defined and in the same manner underlying the Sierra Barrosa Formation, all belonging to the Río Neuquén Subgroup of the Neuquén Group in the Neuquén Basin. The unit now known as Los Bastos Formation was included in the original definition by Herrero Ducloux (1938, 1939) as "Portezuelo Medio", as part of the "Portezuelo Beds" he described.

The type locality of the formation is located at the foot of the outcrop of the eponymous Los Bastos Field, between the localities of Sierra Barrosa and Cerro Senillosa. The formation at its type section reaches a thickness of 35 metres (115 ft). The formation comprises red mudstones intercalated by thin levels of siltstones and fine well-sorted yellowish to greenish grey sandstones. The formation has similar lithological characteristics as the Lisandro Formation and was deposited in a fluvial environment characterized by sinuous channels. Based on the stratigraphic relations with the overlying and underlying units, the age has been estimated to be early to middle Coniacian.

== Fossil content ==
The formation has provided fossils of:

- Mammals
  - Meridiolestida indet.

== See also ==
- List of dinosaur bearing rock formations
