= Río Neuquén Subgroup =

Geological subgroup in Argentina

- Stratigraphic range: Late Turonian-Late Coniacian; ~91–86 Ma
- Type: Subgroup
- Unit of: Neuquén Group
- Sub-units: Plottier, Sierra Barrosa, Los Bastos & Portezuelo Formations
- Underlies: Río Colorado Subgroup
- Overlies: Río Limay Subgroup
- Thickness: Up to 155 m (509 ft)

Lithology
- Primary: Sandstone
- Other: Claystone, limestone, mudstone

Location
- Coordinates: 37.4°S 69.1°W
- Approximate paleocoordinates: 42.2°S 49.4°W
- Region: Mendoza, Río Negro & Neuquén Provinces
- Country: Argentina
- Extent: Neuquén Basin

Type section
- Named for: Neuquén River
- Río Neuquén Subgroup (Argentina)

The Río Neuquén Subgroup is a geological subgroup in the Neuquén Basin, Neuquén Province, Argentina, whose strata date back to the Late Cretaceous. The subgroup, formerly defined as a formation, is the middle unit of the Neuquén Group and contains the Plottier, Sierra Barrosa Formation, Los Bastos Formation, and Portezuelo Formations. The subgroup overlies the Río Limay Subgroup and is overlain by the Río Colorado Subgroup. Dinosaur remains are among the fossils that have been recovered from the formation.

== Fossil content ==
Dinosaurs
| Genus | Species | Location | Stratigraphic position | Material | Notes | Images |
|---|---|---|---|---|---|---|
| Antarctosaurus | A. giganteus | | | "[Two] femora, pubis." | Río Neuquén remains previously referred to A. giganteus are now attributed to an indeterminate sauropod. | |
| Antarctosaurus | A. wichmannianus | | | | | |
| Megaraptor | M. namunhuaiquii | | | "Partial forelimb, manus, and pes." | | |
| Patagonykus | P. puertai | | | "Partial postcranial skeleton." | | |
| Rinconsaurus | R. cadamirus | | | | | |
| Titanosaurus | Indeterminate | | | | Titanosaurus is now considered a nomen dubium. | |
| Unenlagia | U. comahuensis | | | "Fragmentary postcrania." | | |

== See also ==
- List of dinosaur-bearing rock formations
