= Glossary of dinosaur anatomy =

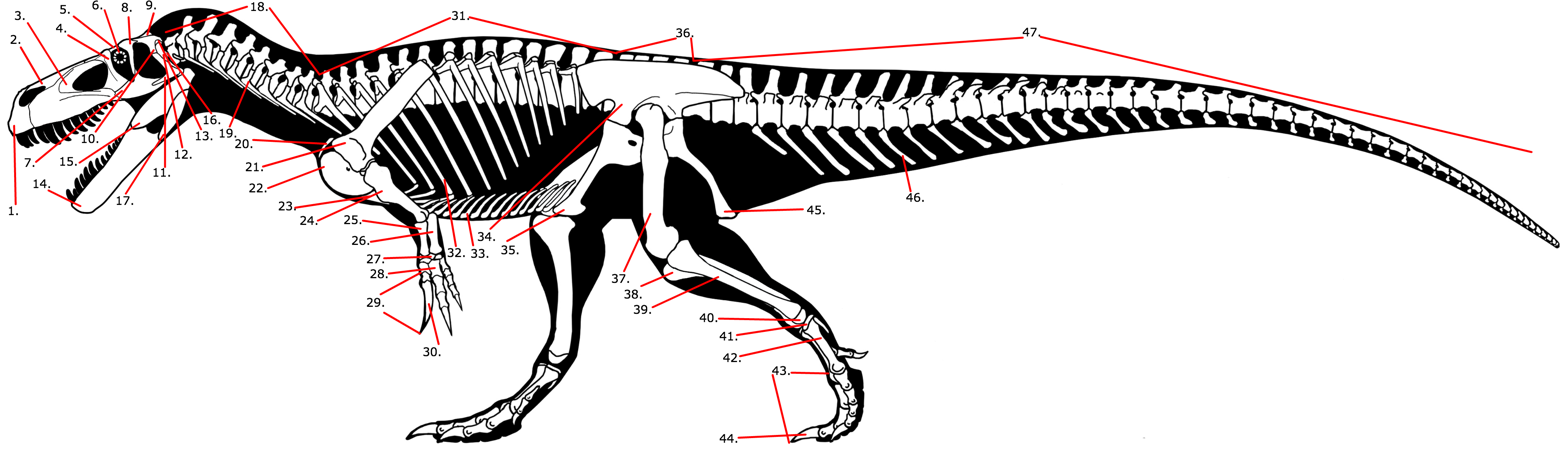
Labelled skeleton of Torvosaurus in lateral view: 1 premaxilla, 2 nasal, 3 maxilla, 4 lacrimal, 5 frontal, 6 scleral ring, 7 jugal, 8 postorbital, 9 parietal, 10 squamosal, 11 quadratojugal, 12 quadrate, 13 supraoccipital, 14 dentary, 15 surangular, 16 occiput, 17 angular, 18 cervical vertebrae, 19 cervical ribs, 20 furcula, 21 scapula, 22 coracoid, 23 sternum, 24 humerus, 25 radius, 26 ulna, 27 carpals, 28 metacarpals, 29 manus, 30 unguals, 31 dorsal vertebrae, 32 dorsal ribs, 33 gastralia, 34 ilium, 35 pubis, 36 sacrum, 37 femur, 38 tibia, 39 fibula, 40 astragalus, 41 tarsals, 42 metatarsals, 43 pes, 44 unguals, 45 ischium, 46 chevrons, 47 caudal vertebrae

This glossary explains technical terms commonly employed in the description of dinosaur body fossils. Besides dinosaur-specific terms, it covers terms with wider usage, when these are of central importance in the study of dinosaurs or when their discussion in the context of dinosaurs is beneficial. The glossary does not cover ichnological and bone histological terms, nor does it cover measurements.

== A ==
acetabulum
In dinosaurs, the acetabulum (plural: acetabula) or hip socket is an opening in the pelvis formed by the ilium, pubis, and ischium that is visible in lateral and medial views. It accommodates the head of the femur, forming the hip joint. Most tetrapods show a closed acetabulum, in which the socket is completely filled with bone, forming a depression. Dinosaurs are unique in showing a perforate or open acetabulum, where the full extent of the socket is a hole without infilling bone.
acromion
The acromion is a bony ridge on the lower part of the scapula that functions in providing an attachment for the clavicle. Nodosaurids develop a pronounced spur known as the pseudoacromion, which probably formed an attachment site for the Musculus scapulohumeralis anterior, and therefore is analogous with the acromion of mammals.
adductor fossa
The adductor fossa or Meckelian orifice in reptiles and dinosaurs is the major opening into the lower jaw, located between the tooth-bearing region and the jaw articulation. It opens dorsally, and is laterally walled by the surangular and medially by the prearticular; as the latter is usually much lower than the former, the fossa is visible in medial view. The floor of the opening is formed by the angular and houses the posterior part of the Meckelian cartilage. The adductor fossa and its surrounding margins serve as an insertion point for major adductor muscles that close the jaw; it also allows the jaw's main nerve, artery, and vein to enter the interior of the jaw.

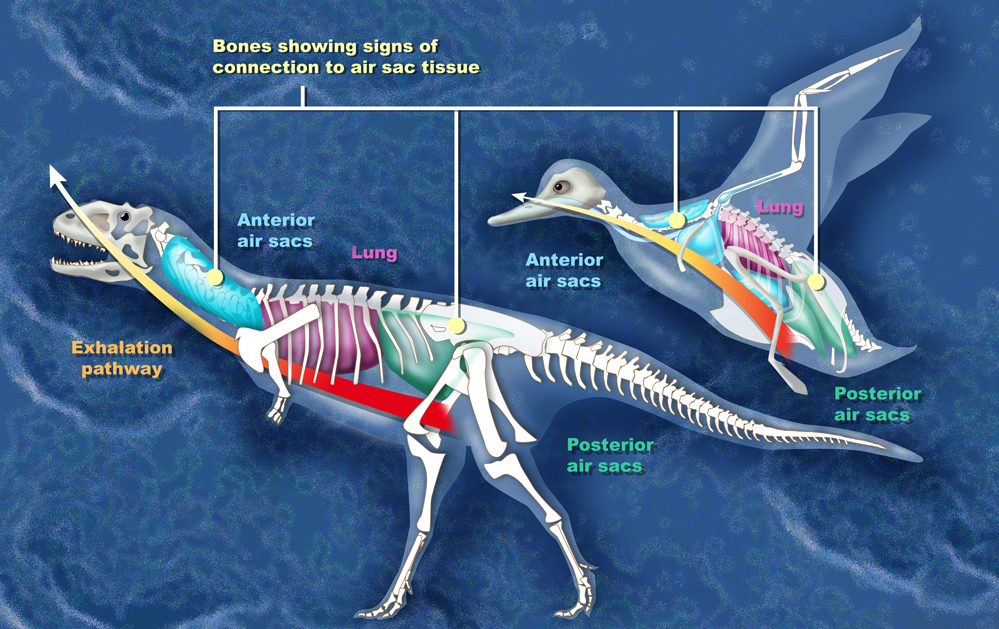
Comparison between the air sacs of Majungasaurus and a bird

air sacs
In modern birds, pulmonary air sacs are thin-walled, translucent air-filled bags connected to the lung. Together with the lung, air sacs form a highly efficient respiratory system, which in birds is capable of extracting up to 160% more oxygen than is possible in mammals. Although only limited gas exchange is taking place within air sacs, they power the ventilation of the lung. Air sacs located both posterior and anterior to the lung allow for a constant airflow through the lung. Smaller and blind air-filled bags extending from the air sacs and the lung are known as pneumatic diverticula (singular: diverticulum); these can be numerous and present in most of the body. Some pneumatic diverticula will resorb and penetrate bones as an animal grows, creating fossae (depressions) on the bone surface as well as internal chambers within the bones, a process known as postcranial skeletal pneumatization (PSP). Although air sacs do not fossilize, their presence at least in saurischian dinosaurs is indicated by distinctive traces of pneumatization in the bones.
alveoli
Dental alveoli (singular: alveolus) or tooth sockets are pits in the jaws containing the roots of teeth. Within the alveoli, teeth are periodically replaced by new teeth growing beneath; shedding of the old tooth crown occurs after resorption of the root. The condition of having deep alveoli is known as thecodont, and is present throughout Archosauria, including dinosaurs. Most squamates, on the other hand, show the pleurodont condition, where the teeth are fused to the inner sides of the jaw bones, or the acrodont dentition, in which the teeth are fused to the top of the jaw bones without sockets. The thecodont condition was historically used to define a clade, the Thecodontia, which is now considered paraphyletic and thus obsolete.
angular
The angular is a dermal bone of the lower jaw. In lateral view, it covers a larger area of the posteroventral region of the jaw, being located behind the dentary and below the surangular. In medial view of the lower jaw, it is visible below the prearticular. It forms the floor of the adductor fossa and supports the posterior portion of the Meckelian cartilage.

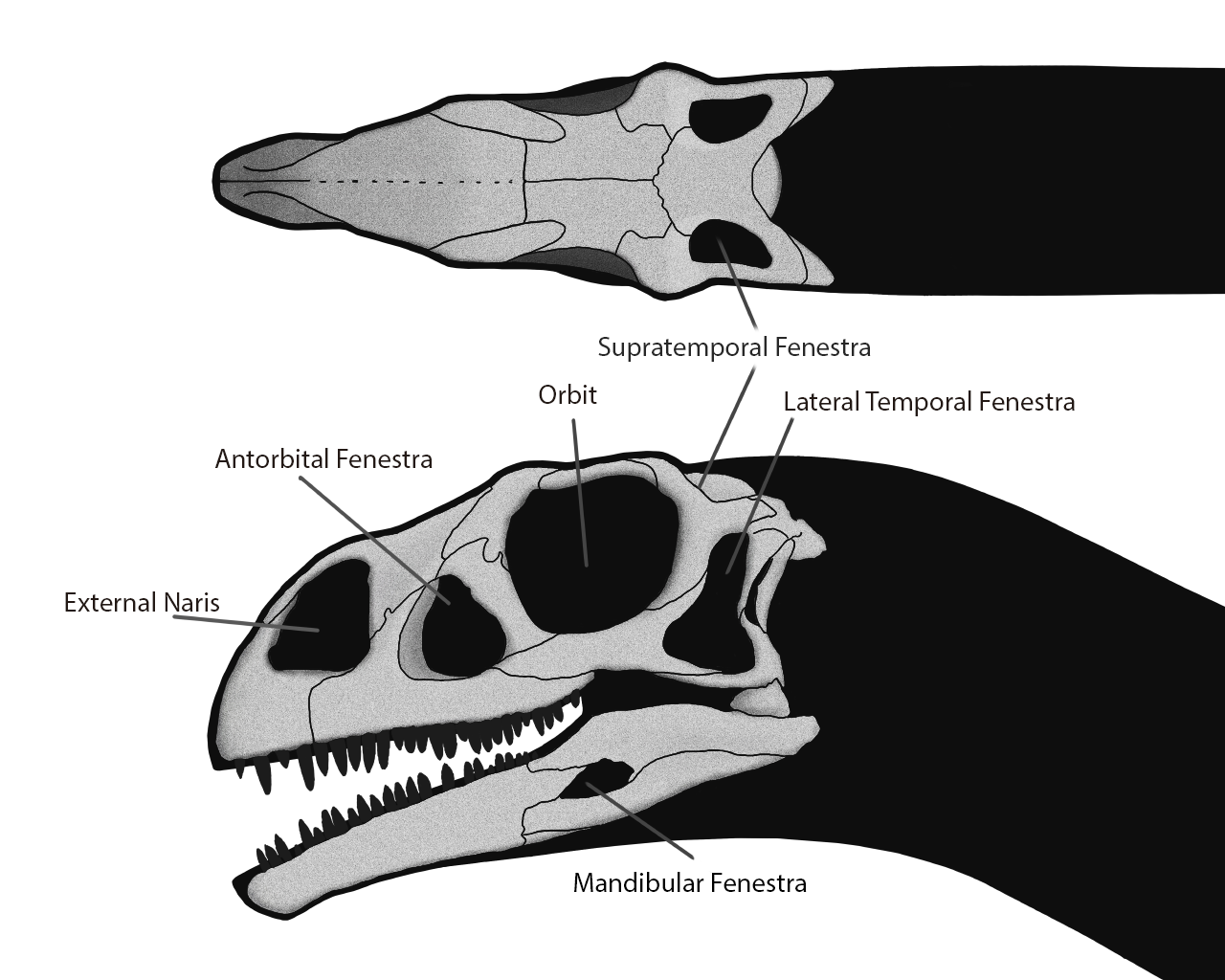
Skull diagram of the basal sauropodomorph Massospondylus, showing the main skull openings (fenestra), including the external naris, the antorbital fenestra, the orbit, the infratemporal fenestra (here: lateral temporal fenestra), the supratemporal fenestra, and the mandibular fenestra.

antorbital fenestra
The antorbital fenestra is one of the five major openings of the skull, located between the orbit and the external naris (nostril). Present in most early Archosauriformes (including Archosauria), it is primitively present in dinosaurs; it tends to be large in saurischians, but is reduced or entirely closed in ornithischians. The antorbital fenestra lies within a larger depression, the antorbital fossa. This fossa can contain additional, smaller openings, namely the maxillary fenestra (also: accessory antorbital fenestra) and the promaxillary fenestra.
articular
The articular is the hindmost bone of the lower jaw. On its dorsal surface, it contains the glenoid, a depression into which fits the lower end of the quadrate bone of the skull, forming the jaw joint. It is the only endochondral bone of the lower jaw, forming directly out of the posterior part of the Meckelian cartilage. In mammals, the articular migrated into the skull, forming the malleus of the middle ear.
articulated
An articulation is any joint between bones. The term is also used to describe the preservation of specimens: In an articulated specimen, individual bones stick together in their original anatomical position. Conversely, a disarticulated skeleton has its bones moved out of their original anatomical compound. A specimen found with its bones disarticulated but in close proximity to each other is termed an associated skeleton. The transition from a completely articulated skeleton to a cluster of isolated and unassociated bones is fluent.
astragalus
The astragalus (plural: astragali) is a major bone in the ankle. It is located directly below the tibia and medial to the calcaneum, which sits below the fibula. The astragalus does not rotate against the calcaneum or the tibia; instead, it is frequently fused to both elements in bipeds (see also: tibiotarsus).
atlas
The atlas is the first (foremost) vertebra of the vertebral column. It receives the occipital condyle of the base of the skull, thus forming the connection between skull and spine. Dinosaurs possessed single condyles allowing for rotational movement between atlas and skull. Mammals, on the other hand, show double condyles, limiting movement to one plane; here, rotational movement is mostly taking place between the atlas and the second vertebra, the axis. The atlas in dinosaurs is primitive in comprising three separate elements, reflecting the basal condition in reptiles: the atlantal neurapophysis (plural: atlantal neurapophyses; also: atlantal neural arch) at the top; the intercentrum at the front and the centrum at the back. An additional small bone, the proatlas, sits in front of the neural arch. The centrum part of the atlas is also termed the odontoid. The three elements generally remain separate in dinosaurs, but can be fused together. In ceratopsians, the atlas, as well as the axis and third vertebra, are fused into a single bone.
arctometatarsal
In the arctometatarsalian condition (from Latin arctus – "compressed"), the middle (third) metatarsal of the foot is pinched between the surrounding metatarsals (the second and fourth) at its upper end, thus disappearing in anterior view. This condition is found in some derived theropods, including ornithomimids, tyrannosaurids, troodontids, elmisaurids, and avimimids, and was hypothesized to function as a shock absorber during running, allowing for higher degrees of cursoriality. Originally, this character was used to define a clade, the Arctometatarsalia, which is now considered polyphyletic.
axis
The axis is the second vertebra of the spine, following the atlas. It is larger than the latter, with its centrum fused with its neural arch, and with the neural spine well-developed. Its small intercentrum, located in front of the centrum, is separate in theropods but becomes fused with the centrum of the atlas in ornithischians.
axony
The term axony describes the location of the dominant (largest and most projecting) digit in a hand or foot, and is most commonly employed in the description of footprints. When the central digit (generally digit III) is dominant, as is the case in the feet of most bipedal dinosaurs, the hand or foot is mesaxonic. An entaxonic hand or foot has its dominant digit medially (either digit I or II); this rare condition can be found in sauropod feet. Conversely, the ectaxonic hand/foot has its dominant digit exteriorly (often digit IV). When either two or four digits are present and neither half of the hand or foot is more dominant than the other, the condition is termed paraxonic.

== B ==
basal tubera
The basal tubera (singular: basal tuber) or sphenoccipital tubercles are a pair of tubercle-like extensions on the underside of the braincase that function as attachment sites for ventral neck muscles. They are formed by the basioccipital and the basisphenoid bones, and are strongly pronounced in saurischians but only moderately so in ornithischians.
basicranium
The basicranium is the floor of the braincase, and formed by the basioccipital, basisphenoid, and parasphenoid.
basisphenoid
The basisphenoid bone forms the front part of the floor of the braincase. Not visible from the outside in an articulated skull, it is fused to the basioccipital at the rear and to the parasphenoid at the front. A pair of distinctive processes, the basipterygoid processes, extend from its underside and articulate with the pterygoids of the palate.
basioccipital
The basioccipital is an unpaired bone of the skull, and one of four bones forming the occiput of the braincase. It is exposed in rear view of the articulated skull. It forms most of the occipital condyle, a rounded process connecting the skull to the atlas, the first vertebra of the neck. Above, it is fused with the paired exoccipitals. It also forms the posterior part of the floor of the braincase, being fused with the basisphenoid at its front.

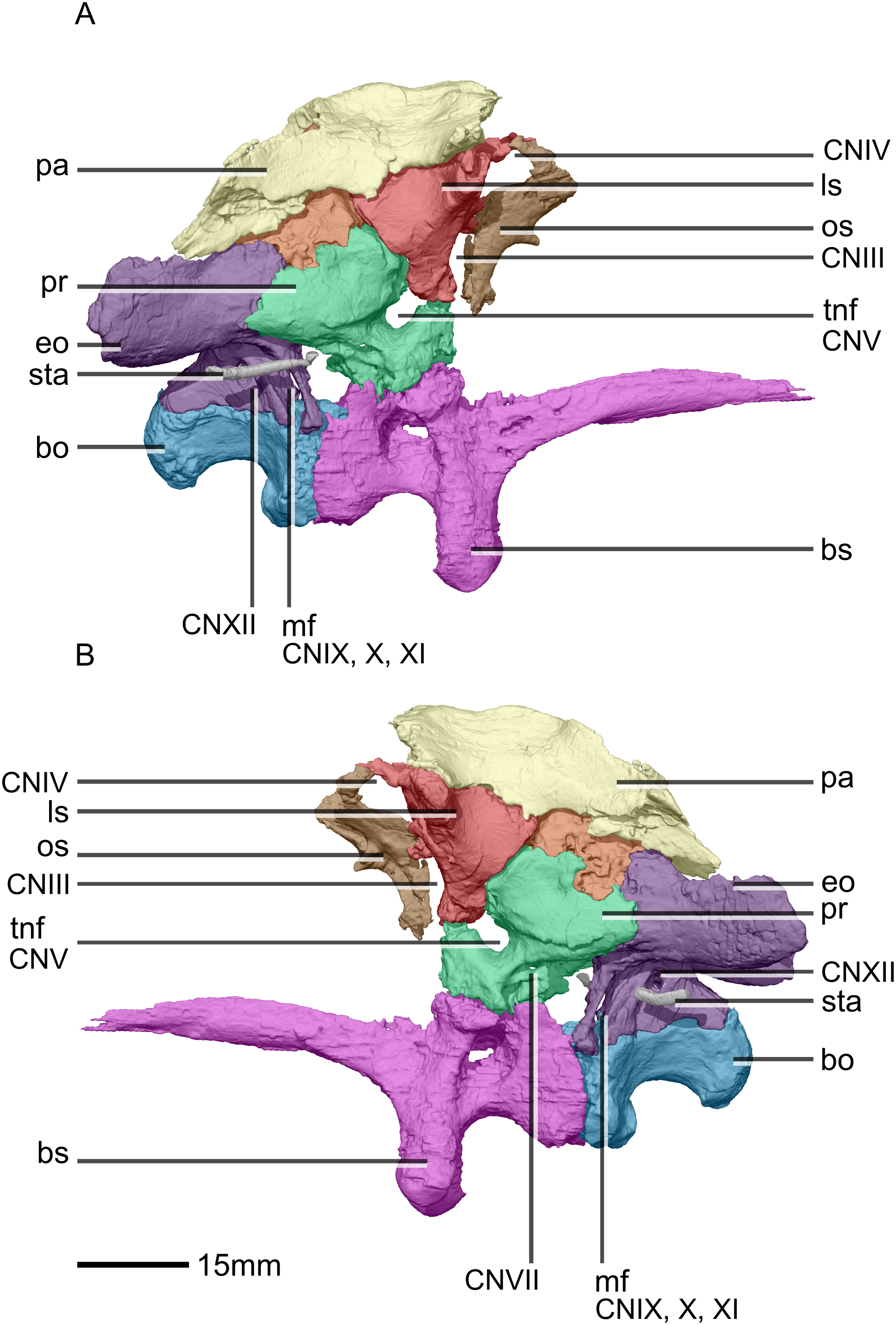
A: right side view. B: left side view.

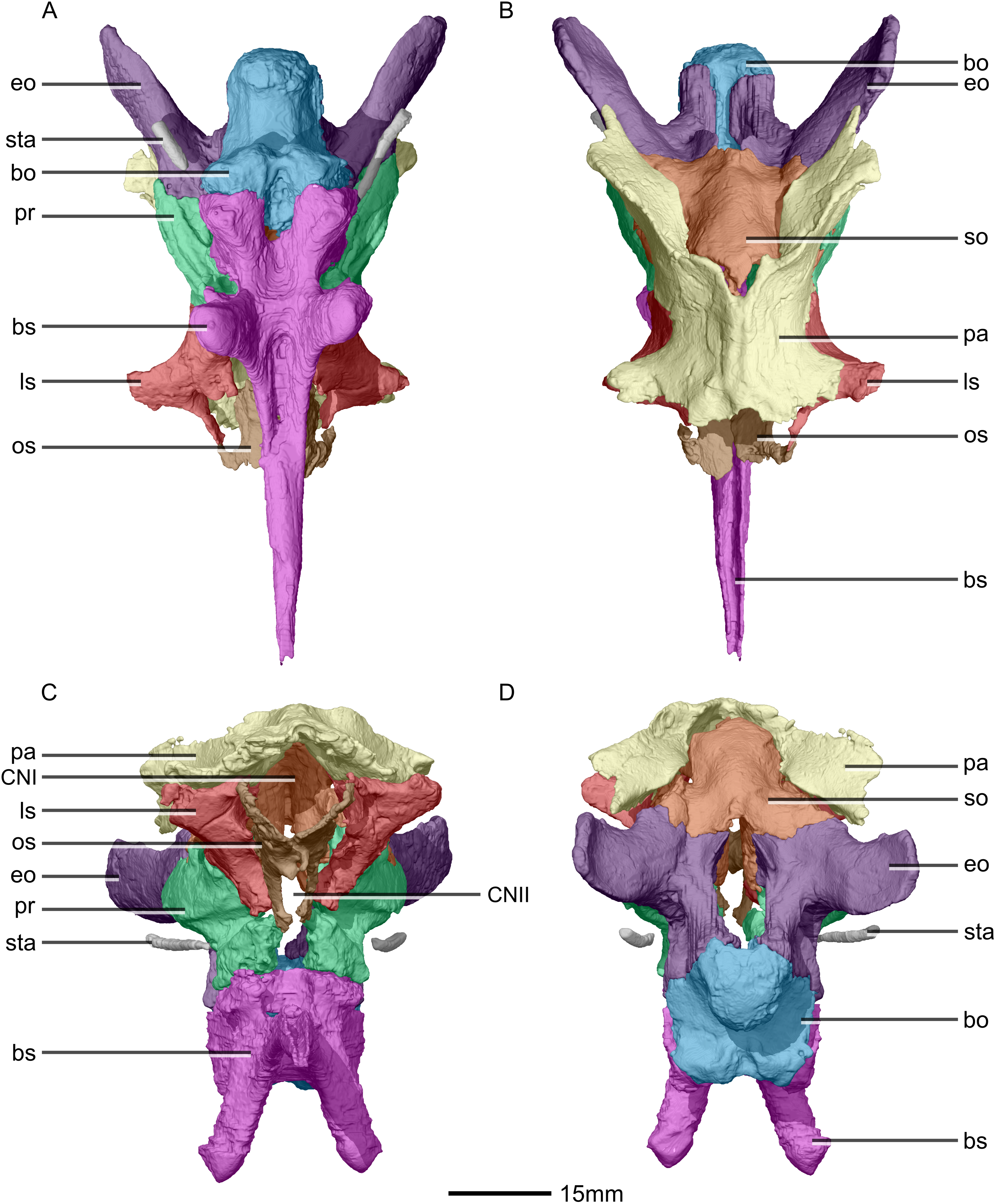
A: bottom view. B: top view. C: front view. D: rear view.

3D-reconstruction of the braincase of Massospondylus in various views, and with individual bones colored. Abbreviations: bo – basioccipital; bs – fused basisphenoid and parasphenoid; CN – cranial nerve passage; eo – exoccipital-opisthotic; ls – laterosphenoid; os – orbitosphenoid; pa – parietal (commonly regarded part of the skull roof); pr – prootic; so – supraoccipital; sta – stapes.
bone
Bones are, besides teeth, the most common dinosaur body fossils. Composed of hydroxylapatite, bones are hard mineralized and thus durable. Soft parts, in contrast, may only be preserved as impressions, and are directly preserved only in exceptional cases. Bony parts include the skull, the axial skeleton (spine and ribs), and the appendicular skeleton (girdles and limbs). Most of these bones are paired, with a mirror-inverted counterpart on the other side of the body, or unpaired, in which case they usually lie at the body midline and are divided by the latter into two symmetrical halves. Furthermore, bones include a number of elements formed in the skin such as gastralia, bony scutes, and spikes. Paleontologists most frequently study the morphology of bones, but also their histology (the inner microstructure up to the cellular level) and chemical composition provided important insights into dinosaur biology. There are two principal types of bones: Dermal bone is directly formed in the dermis (skin), usually growing from initially thin plates. Among others, most bones forming the outer surface of the skull and lower jaws are dermal bones. In contrast, endochondral bone is formed from a cartilaginous precursor, which ossifies (turn into bone).
braincase
The braincase is the part of the skull housing the brain. In an articulated skull, it is not visible from the outside except from its rear part, the occiput. A complex structure, it is pierced by numerous foramina containing blood vessels and cranial nerves. Individual bones of the braincase tend to be completely fused in adults, with demarcations between the original elements often not visible. In dinosaurs, the anatomy of the braincase is conservative, but for this reason can be used to infer relationships of a group when other skeletal features underwent changes so profound that their origins can no longer be traced. The braincase may also allow for reconstructing the brain and inner ear, with inferences on senses and intelligence.

== C ==
calcaneum
The calcaneum (plural: calcanea) is a major bone of the ankle (at the rear of the foot), and together with the astragalus forms the upper row of tarsal bones. It is located lateral to the astragalus and distal to the fibula.
caputegulum
Caputegulae (Latin "skull tiles") are flat bones covering the skull bones of ankylosaurs. Together with the pyramidal-shaped horns, they form the ornamentation of the skull. Coined by William T. Blowes in 2001, the term can be used for elements representing both co-ossified osteoderms or cranial sculpturing. The position of a caputegulum on the skull can be specified with the use of modifiers; e.g., the nasal caputegulae sit atop the nasal bones.
carinae
Carinae (singular: carina) are enamel ridges that form the cutting edges on the front and rear margins of teeth. They are typically found in carnivorous dinosaurs, and often bear serrations.

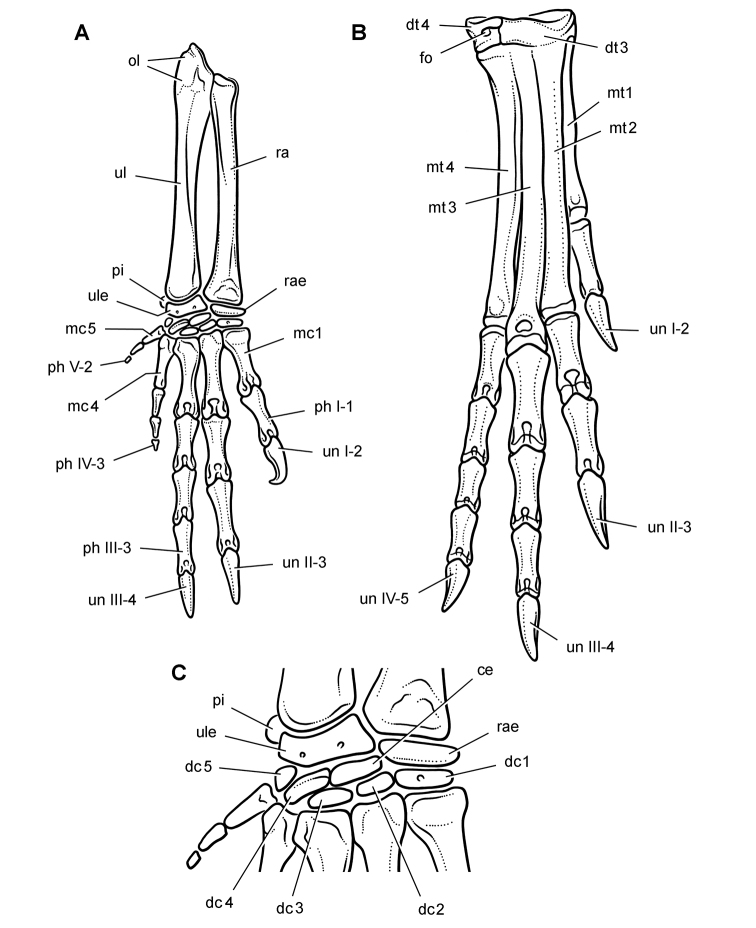
Bones of the forearm and manus (A), pes (B), and carpus (C) of Heterodontosaurus. ol – olecranon process, ul – ulna, ra – radius, pi – pisiform, ule – ulnare, rae – radiale, mc – metacarpal, ph – phalanx, un – ungual, mt – metatarsal.

carpals
The carpal bones form the wrist or carpus, which connects the forearm (radius and ulna) to the metacarpals of the hand. The corresponding part of the foot is the tarsus. Basal reptiles show three rows of carpals. In dinosaurs, the carpus is often not fully ossified, and the number and identity of carpal elements remain unclear in many cases. The carpus is especially well ossified in basal ornithischian Heterodontosaurus, where it consisted of nine elements. The proximal row consisted of the radiale (below the radius), the ulnare (below the ulna), and the pisiform (a small element below the ulna and lateral to the ulnare). The distal row consisted of five elements sitting above the five metatarsals, which are denoted as distal carpals 1–5. The middle row is represented by a single element, the centrale.
carpometacarpus
The carpometacarpus is a bony element of the hand consisting of the fused carpals and metacarpals. This structure occurs in modern birds, but was also present in some theropods closely related to birds, and evolved independently in alvarezsaurids.
caudals
The caudals (from Latin caudum — tail), or caudal vertebrae, are the vertebrae that make up the tail. Ancestrally, dinosaurs showed approximately 50 caudal vertebrae, although their number, size, and shape varied considerably in the separate groups. The number of caudals decreased along the evolutionary line leading to modern birds; in the latter, the remaining caudals are fused together into a pygostyle. Although flexible in early dinosaurs, several clades stiffened their tail with the help of ossified tendons (as in many ornithischians) or elongated prezygapophyses (as in some theropods such as dromaeosaurids). Diplodocid sauropods featured an elongated, whip-like tail, while the tails of some ornithischians are equipped with clubs, spikes, and/or plates.

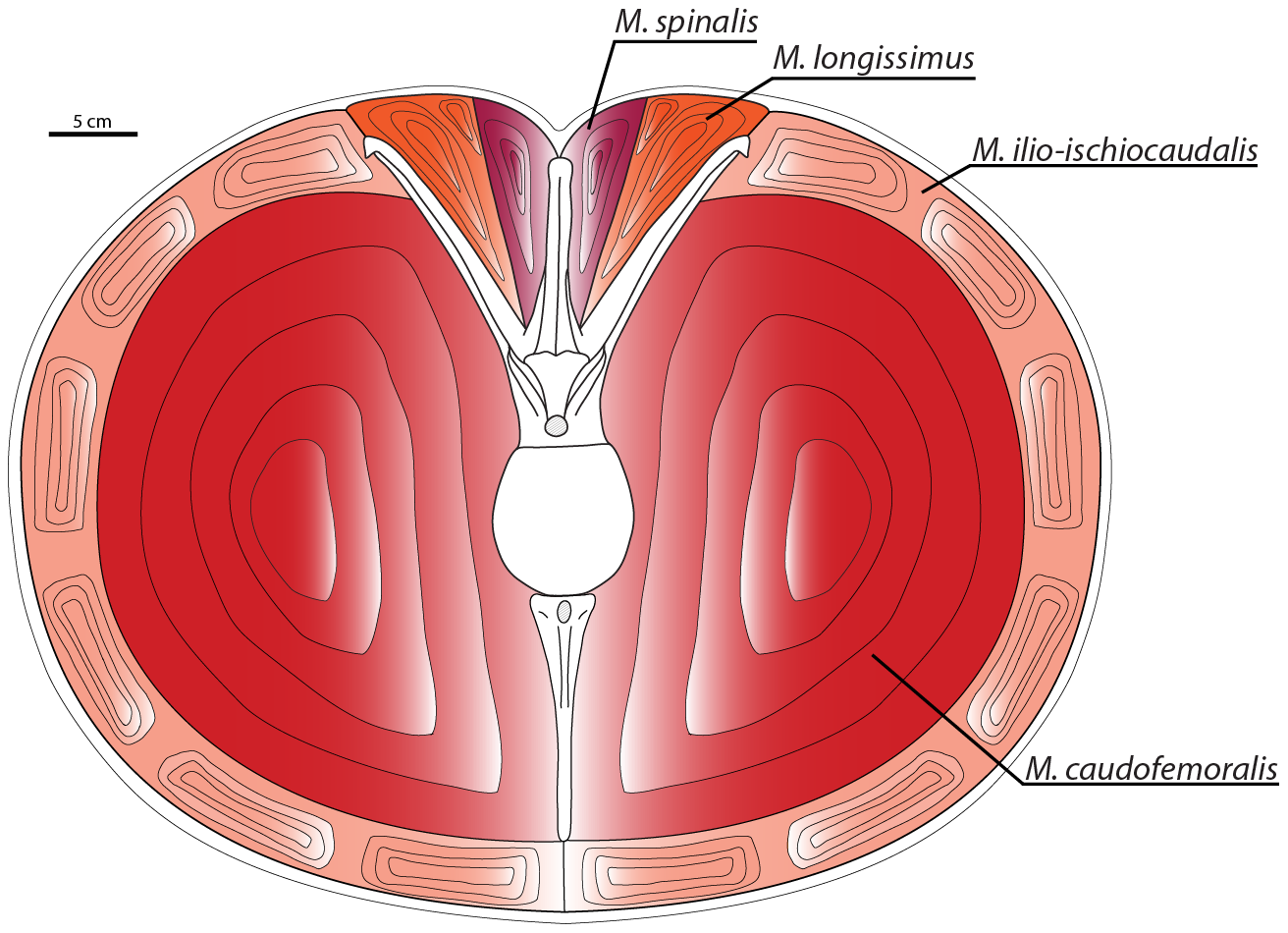
Cross-section of the tail of Carnotaurus, showing the tail musculature.

caudofemoralis
The caudofemoralis muscles, or Musculus caudofemoralis, are the main locomotory muscles in all long-tailed dinosaurs. Located mainly in the tail, they pull the femur of the hind limb backwards when contracted (femoral retraction/hip extension), thus providing propulsion. In long-tailed dinosaurs, the Musculus caudofemoralis is exceptionally large, and can be estimated at 58% of the total mass of the tail in Tyrannosaurus. Two parts are pronounced in dinosaurs: The Musculus caudofemoralis brevis originated on the lower edge of the hind part of the ilium, while the Musculus caudofemoralis longus originated on the anterior portion of the tail, ventral to the transverse processes and beneath the superficial hypaxial tail musculature. Both parts attached to the fourth trochanter on the back of the femur. The caudofemoralis muscles got reduced during theropod evolution, and are mostly lost in modern birds. Birds, in contrast to long-tailed dinosaurs, do not rely on femoral retraction for propulsion, but instead retracted the lower leg around the knee joint.
centrocoel
The centrocoel is the cavernous marrow cavity inside the centrum of a vertebra.
centroprezygapophyseal fossa
The centroprezygapophyseal fossa is a depression on the anterior side of the neural arch pedicles defined by the centroprezygapophyseal lamina.
centrum
The centrum (plural: centra), also vertebral body or corpus, is a spool- or cylinder-shaped element that, together with the neural arch, forms a vertebra. In juveniles, both centra and neural arches are separate elements, and fusion of these elements is an important criterion to determine adulthood. The anterior and posterior surfaces of the centrum form the articulation with the centra of the preceding and following vertebra. Centra can be classified based on the morphology of these articular surfaces:

Classification of centrum morphologies based on their articular ends in dinosaurs.

- amphicoelous (noun: amphicoely) centra are strongly concave on both ends.
- platycoelous (noun: platycoely) are slightly concave at both ends.
- amphiplatian (noun: amphiplaty. Also: acoelous) centra are flat on both ends.
- procoelous (noun: procoely) centra are anteriorly concave and posteriorly convex.
- opisthocoelous (noun: opisthocoely) centra are posteriorly concave and anteriorly convex.
- heterocoelous (noun: heterocoely) centra are saddle-shaped at both ends.

Amphicoely is the primitive condition tetrapods. In fishes, the ends of the centra are deeply excavated and connected via a small opening, the passage for the notochord. In reptiles, this type of centrum is present in embryos, and in adult forms of some species; in most species including dinosaurs, centra are more ossified with the notochordal opening closed, improving resistance against compressional forces. Heterocoelous vertebrae allow flexibility while preventing rotation. Procoelous and opisthocoelous centra form concavo-convex (ball and socket) joints, where the convex end, the condyle, fits into the concave end, the cotyle (also: cotyla). This configuration allows for greater stability without restricting mobility. In long necks and tails, this stabilization works best when the convex part is pointing away from the body. In sauropods, vertebrae in front of the sacrum are therefore typically opisthocoelous, while those of the tail are procoelous. As a vertebral column can contain different types of central morphologies, transitional centra with the two ends shaped differently may occur.

cerebellum
The cerebellum ("little brain") is a dorsal part of the hind brain between the brain stem and the cerebrum and serves in controlling balance, posture, and movement. This part of the brain usually cannot be observed in dinosaur fossils as it is rarely seen on endocasts; an exception is the possible preservation of cerebellar folia in Conchoraptor.

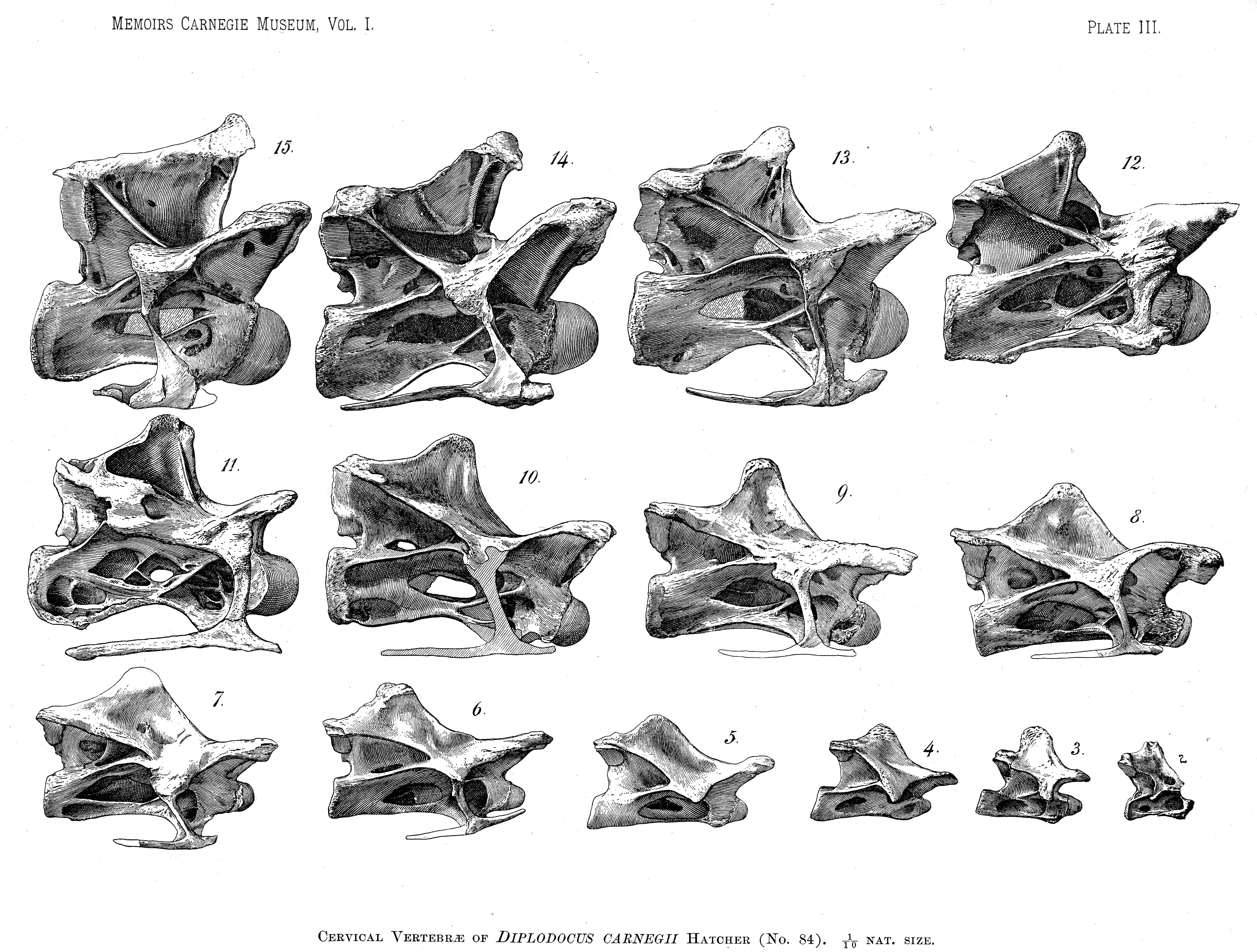
Illustration of cervicals 15-2 of Diplodocus

cervicals
The cervicals, or cervical vertebrae, are the neck vertebrae. Most dinosaurs possessed 9 to 10 cervicals, although higher numbers were achieved in some groups including sauropods, both by increasing the vertebral count and by integrating dorsal vertebrae into the neck.
cervical half-ring
A cervical half-ring is a transversally oriented, collar-like row of osteoderms protecting the upper side of the neck in ankylosaurs (the underside of the neck is left bare). An individual usually possessed two cervical half-rings, with the anterior one being smaller than the posterior one. Cervical half-rings are a synapomorphy of Ankylosauria.
cervical rib
Cervical ribs are bones that attach lateroventrally to the cervical vertebrae. They are plesiomorphic for amniotes (although lost in mammals) and comprise an anterior and a posterior process. Some sauropodomorphs, especially some long-necked sauropods such as Giraffatitan, possessed hyperelongated cervical ribs with posterior processes overlapping two or three preceding vertebrae. Bone histological analysis has shown these elongated processes to represent ossified tendons, meaning that their ends were connected to muscles. The great length of the processes would have increased the distance between the muscle body and the vertebra the muscle is operating, allowing the muscle to be located close to the body, lightening the neck.

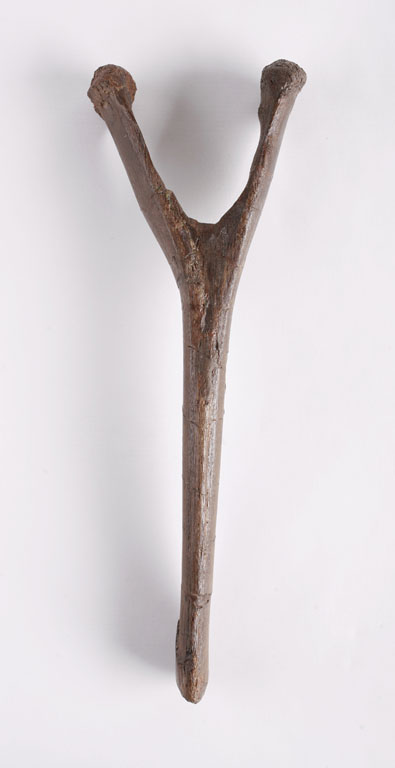
Chevron of Edmontosaurus in front view.

chevron
Chevrons, or haemal arches, are bones attached to the underside of caudal vertebrae, forming the ventral surface of the tail. A chevron comprises a left and right part, which are typically fused to each other in a V-shaped fashion, enclosing a large opening that can be seen in front or back view. The openings of multiple consecutive chevrons form the haemal canal of the tail, which protects nerves and blood vessels.
choanae
The choanae (singular: choana), or internal nares (singular: internal naris), are a pair of openings in the roof of the mouth that are continuous with the external nares, or nostrils, forming the nasal passage. The left and right openings of the pair are separated along midline of the skull by the vomer. In dinosaurs, choanae are usually very large and elongate.
cingulum
A cingulum (plural: cingula) is a shelf-like bulge surrounding the base of a tooth crown.
clavicles
The clavicles, also claviculae (singular: clavicula) or collarbones, are a pair of strut-like and curved bones located above the coracoid in the shoulder. These dermal bones are attached to the acromion of the scapula, and are best seen in front view of a skeleton. Clavicles are infrequently found with dinosaur skeletons, which probably be due to their low preservation potential.
coracoid
The coracoid is a paired bone of the pectoral girdle that is attached to the lower end of the scapula. A flat and in dinosaurs typically semicircle- to square shaped element, it is endochondral in origin. Its bottom margin forms part of the glenoid of the shoulder joint, together with the scapula. The coracoid shows an opening on its lateral surface, the coracoid foramen, through which the supracoracoid nerve passes.

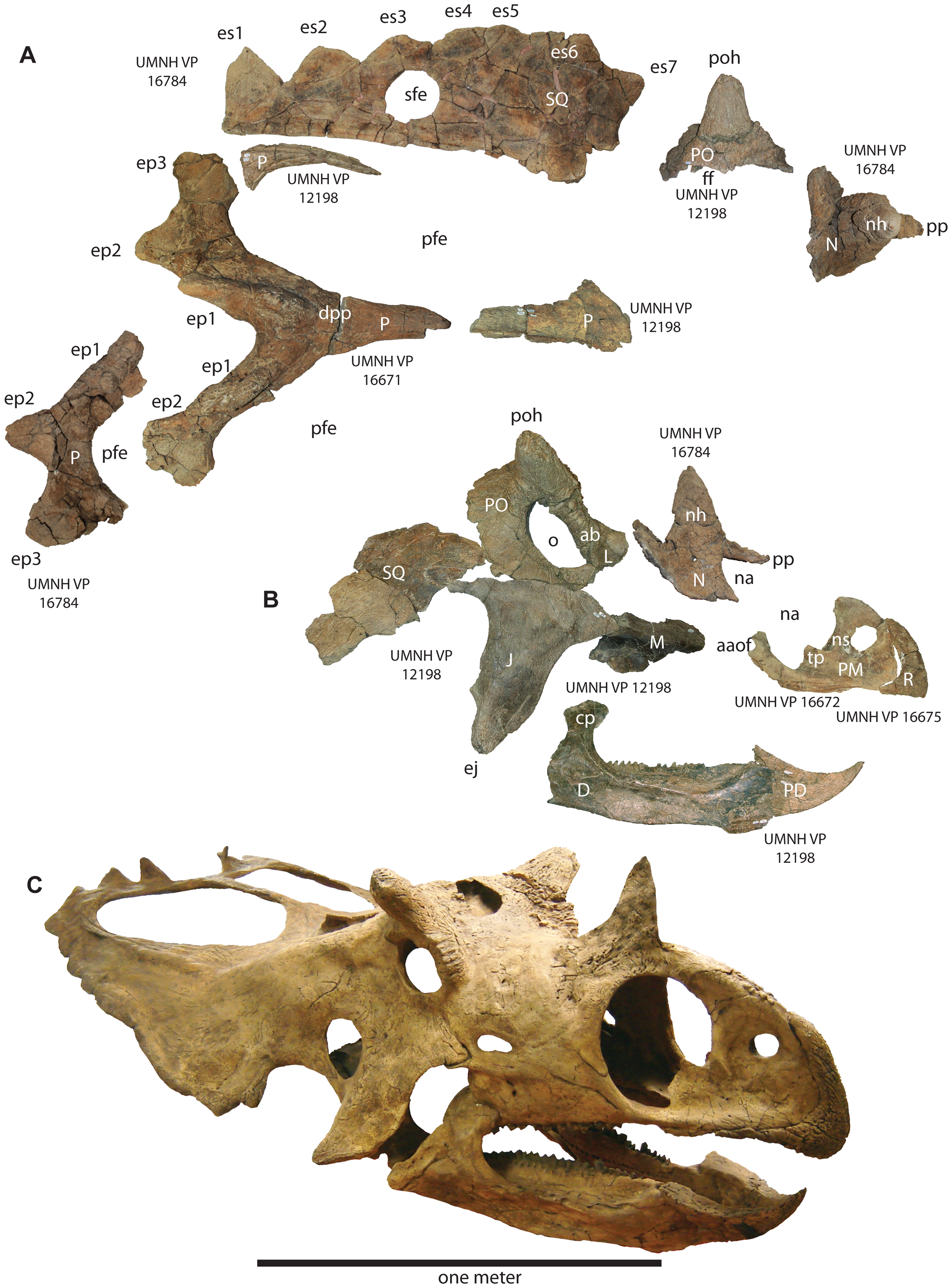
Skull of Utahceratops. The pronounced coronoid process is labeled "cp".

coronoid process
The coronoid process is a bony projection that extends upwards from the upper surface of the lower jaw behind the tooth row. This process serves as an attachment site for muscles that close the jaw; a higher coronoid process increases the lever arm of these muscles, and thus the bite force. (see Figure here)
cranial kinesis
Cranial kinesis is the ability of parts of the skull to move against each other at joints within the skull. Though cranial kinesis had been proposed for a number of non-avian dinosaur taxa, a 2008 review found most of these inferences problematic. Forms of cranial kinesis suggested to occur in dinosaurs include:
- streptostyly: The movement of the quadrate around the squamosal at the otic joint. The quadrate would mostly swing parallel to the skull midline, although transverse movements may be involved.
- prokinesis: The movement between the braincase and the facial skeleton around the nasofrontal joint (a joint between the nasal and frontal), or movement between the left and right nasal. This type occurs in modern birds.
- neurokinesis (also: basal joint kinesis): The movement of the braincase against the palate around the basipterygoid joint (or basal joint).
- pleurokinesis: The ability of the maxilla to swing outwards. Pleurokinesis had been proposed as a novel type of cranial kinesis for ornithopods, allowing for the use of transverse jaw movements in chewing. This complex form of cranial kinesis requires, besides the mobility of the maxilla and facial skeleton, transverse movements of the quadrate against the squamosal (a modified form of streptostyly) as well as basal joint kinesis.

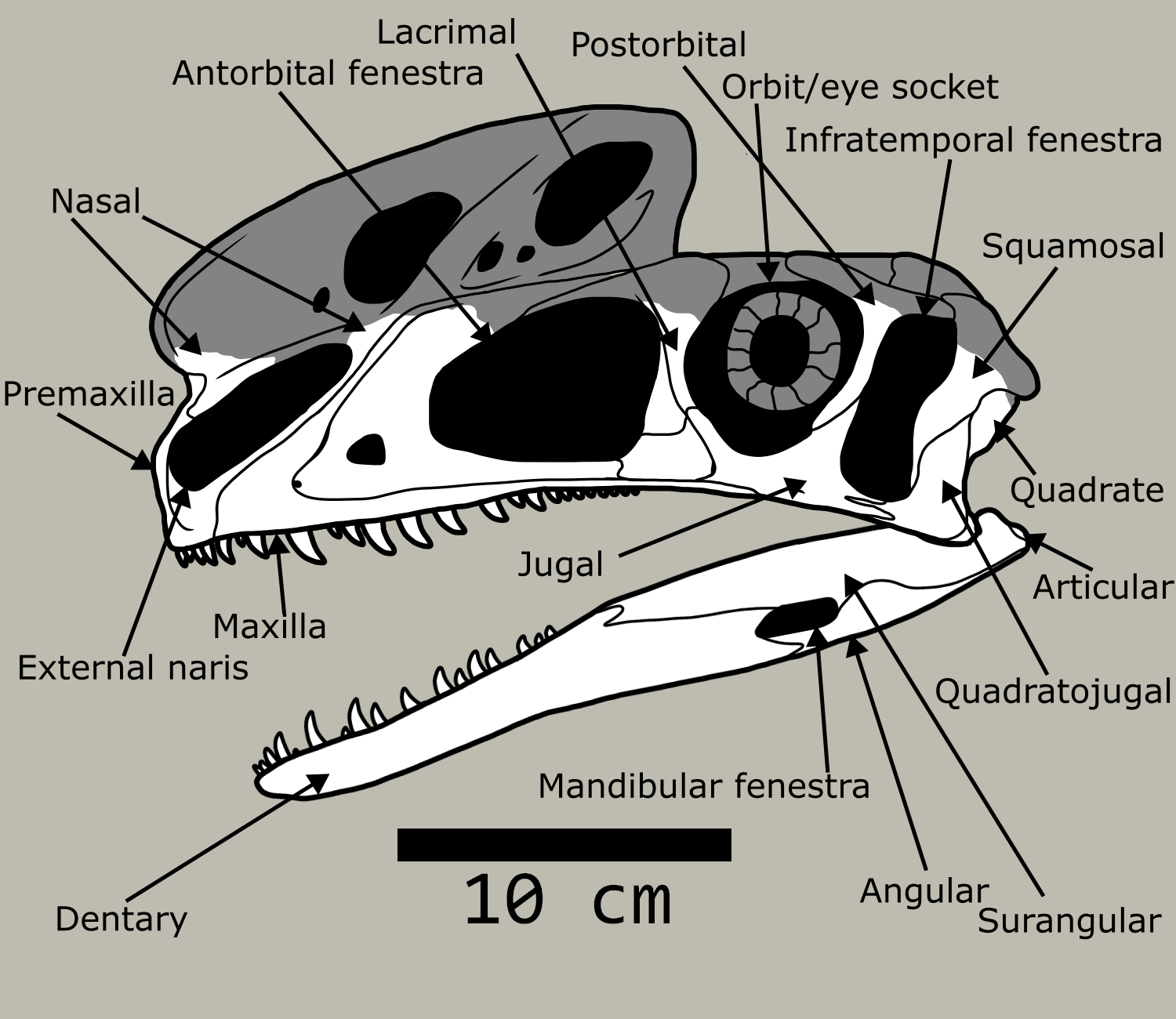
Diagram of the skull of Proceratosaurus, with the lower jaw bones labeled

== D ==
death pose
A death pose, or opisthotonic posture, is a common posture seen in articulated dinosaur and bird fossils where the spine is strongly curved upwards (hyperextended). Different possible causes are debated, and include opisthotonus (death throes) and the release of the Ligamentum elasticum interlaminare during decomposition.

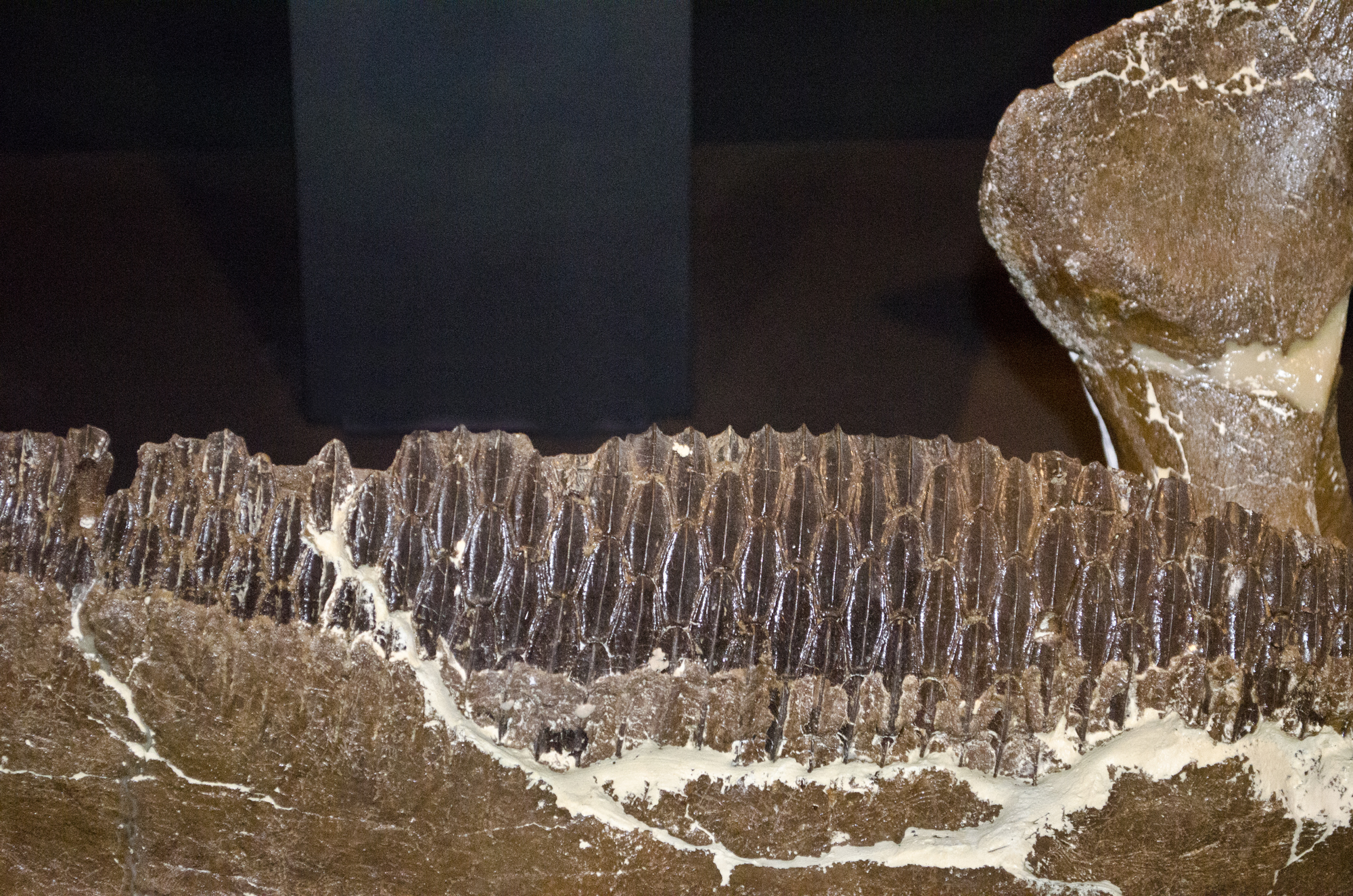
Lower jaw of Edmontosaurus showing the dental battery

dental battery
A dental battery is a type of dentition in some herbivorous dinosaurs where individual teeth are packed tightly together to form a continuous grinding surface. In the hadrosaurid Edmontosaurus, the dental battery of each half of the upper and lower jaws contains more than 60 rows of teeth, with each row comprising up to three functional teeth stacked upon each other and up to five replacement teeth beneath this stack that would erupt from the jaws once the functional teeth were worn down and shed. The most sophisticated dentition type in dinosaurs, it evolved independently in hadrosaurids, ceratopsians, and some sauropods, and differs in form and function in these separate clades.
dentary
The dentary is the main bone of the mandible. It is the only mandible bone that bears teeth, and is located anterior to all other jaw bones except in ornithischians, where the tip of the lower jaw is formed by the predentary. At their anterior ends, the dentaries of the left and right jaw are connected together, forming the mandibular symphysis.
dentition
Dentition is a collective term for all teeth present within the jaws of an individual dinosaur. The dentition can be homodont, when only a single type of teeth is present, or heterodont in the case of different types. Teeth are continuously replaced during life. Teeth that are erupted and currently in use are termed the functional teeth. For each tooth position, there are typically one or two unerupted replacement teeth at any time, which successively migrate into the tooth socket and replace the functional tooth once the latter fell out. Some herbivorous species may show up to six replacement teeth per tooth position. Tooth turnover started with the resorption of the root of the functional tooth. Teeth ejected after replacement lack their root, and are called shed teeth.
deltopectoral crest
The deltopectoral crest is a forward directed bony flange on the upper part of the humerus. An especially long and prominent deltopectoral crest is a dinosaurian synapomorphy, i.e., a feature differentiating the group from other groups. In dinosaurs, the crest measures 30–40% of the length of the humerus. It provided insertion surfaces for muscles of the shoulder and chest (the deltoid and pectoralis muscles, respectively), which, when contracted, drew the arm towards the body.
digits
The digits, or fingers and toes, form the distal part of the autopodium, following after the metacarpus of the hand and the metatarsus of the foot. They are identified with Roman numerals from I–V, with I denoting the innermost and V the outermost digit. The individual digits have of one or more phalanges (finger and toe bones).
dolichoiliac
Dolichoiliac refers to one of two principal hip bone configurations in early saurischian dinosaurs. The dolichoiliac type is characterised by large front and back extensions of the ilium as well as elongated and narrow pubes and ischia. In contrast, the brachyiliac type is characterised by short ilium extensions and more robust pubes and ischia. The brachyiliac type is typical for basal sauropodomorph dinosaurs of the Triassic, while the dolichoiliac type is characteristic of theropods. Both terms were introduced by Edwin Colbert in 1964.
dorsals
The dorsals, also termed dorsal vertebrae or back vertebrae, are the vertebrae of the back region between the cervicals of the neck and the sacrals of the hip. The Nomina Anatomica Avium (NAA) terminology instead uses the term thoracic vertebrae. In mammals, the term thoracic vertebrae refers only to the rib-bearing vertebrae of the chest, while the vertebrae of the lower back, which lack ribs, are referred to as lumbar vertebrae. This subdivision of the dorsal vertebral column is not applicable in dinosaurs, and the NAA term "thoracic vertebrae" refers to the dorsal vertebral column as a whole. Most dinosaurs had around 15 dorsals. In comparison with the cervicals, the dorsals are shorter, their neural spines longer, and their transverse processes more robust and directed outwards.

== E ==
ectopterygoid
The ectopterygoid is a smaller bone of the palate. Paired and dermal in origin, it connects to the jugal laterally and to the pterygoid medially.
endocast
Endocasts are infillings (moulds) of neural cavities, including the braincase and the neural canal of the vertebrae. They thus can record external features of the neural structures that have been present within these cavities, most importantly the brain. Endocasts are not exact copies of neural structures though, as neural cavities typically contain additional tissue that may obscure the morphology of the neural structure. A natural endocast forms when a neural cavity is filled in by sediment, while artificial endocasts can be produced using casting material.
epijugal
The epijugal is a dermal ossification unique to ceratopsians. It caps the bottom end of the downward-facing, triangular flange of the jugal that is typical for the group. In Arrhinoceratops and Pentaceratops, the epijugal forms a distinct jugal horn. The bone can be found in Yamaceratops and all ceratopsians more derived than the latter.
epoccipital
Epoccipitals are dermal ossifications lining the edges of the frills of ceratopsians. Epoccipitals are distinct bones in juveniles but in adults fuse to either the squamosal or parietal, depending on their position. The epoccipitals of the squamosal are also known as episquamosals, and those of the parietal as epiparietals. Some authors argued against the use of the term epoccipital, as these bones have no connection with the occipital region of the skull, instead preferring the terms episquamosals and epiparietals. Epoccipitals were ornamental instead of functional, and varied widely in shape, forming greatly enlarged spikes in centrosaurines.
epipophysis
Epipophyses are bony projections of the cervical vertebrae found in dinosaurs and some fossil basal birds. These paired processes sit above the postzygapophyses on the rear of the vertebral neural arch. Their morphology is variable and ranges from small, simple, hill-like elevations to large, complex, winglike projections. Epipophyses provided large attachment areas for several neck muscles; large epipophyses are therefore indicative of a strong neck musculature. The presence of epipophyses is considered a synapomorphy of dinosaurs.
epiossifications
Epiossifications (also spelled epi-ossifications) are accessory ossifications attached to the skulls of ceratopsians. They include:
- The rostral, an additional bone in front of the premaxilla of the upper jaw.
- The epinasal, which forms the horn core of the nose horn.
- The epijugals, a pair of bones which often form prominent cheek horns.
- The epiparietals and episquamosals, small ossifications lining the edges of the neck frill (the parietal and squamosal bones, respectively). These ossifications are also collectively termed as epoccipitals.
epipterygoid
The epipterygoid is a paired endochondral bone at the rear part of the palate. A small, plate-like bone, it connects with the pterygoid and the braincase.
exoccipital
The exoccipital is a paired bone that, together with the unpaired supraoccipital and basioccipital, forms the occiput at the back of the skull. In adult dinosaurs, the exoccipitals are fused to the opisthotic, forming a structure also known as the exoccipital-opisthotic. Below, the exoccipitals are fused to the basioccipital.
external nares
The external nares (singular: external naris, also: bony nostrils) are a pair of external skull openings for the nostrils. Important landmarks in the skull, they are primitively located in front of the antorbital fenestra near the tip of the snout. External nares are sometimes referred to as nostrils; this usage is discouraged, however, as the term nostril is reserved for the fleshy opening of the nasal passage (also termed the fleshy nostril), which in some cases may lay far outside of the external naris. The openings of the nasal passage into the oral cavity are, conversely, termed internal nares, or choanae. The often enlarged frontmost part of the nasal cavity, directly below the margins of the external naris, is termed the nasal vestibule.

== F ==
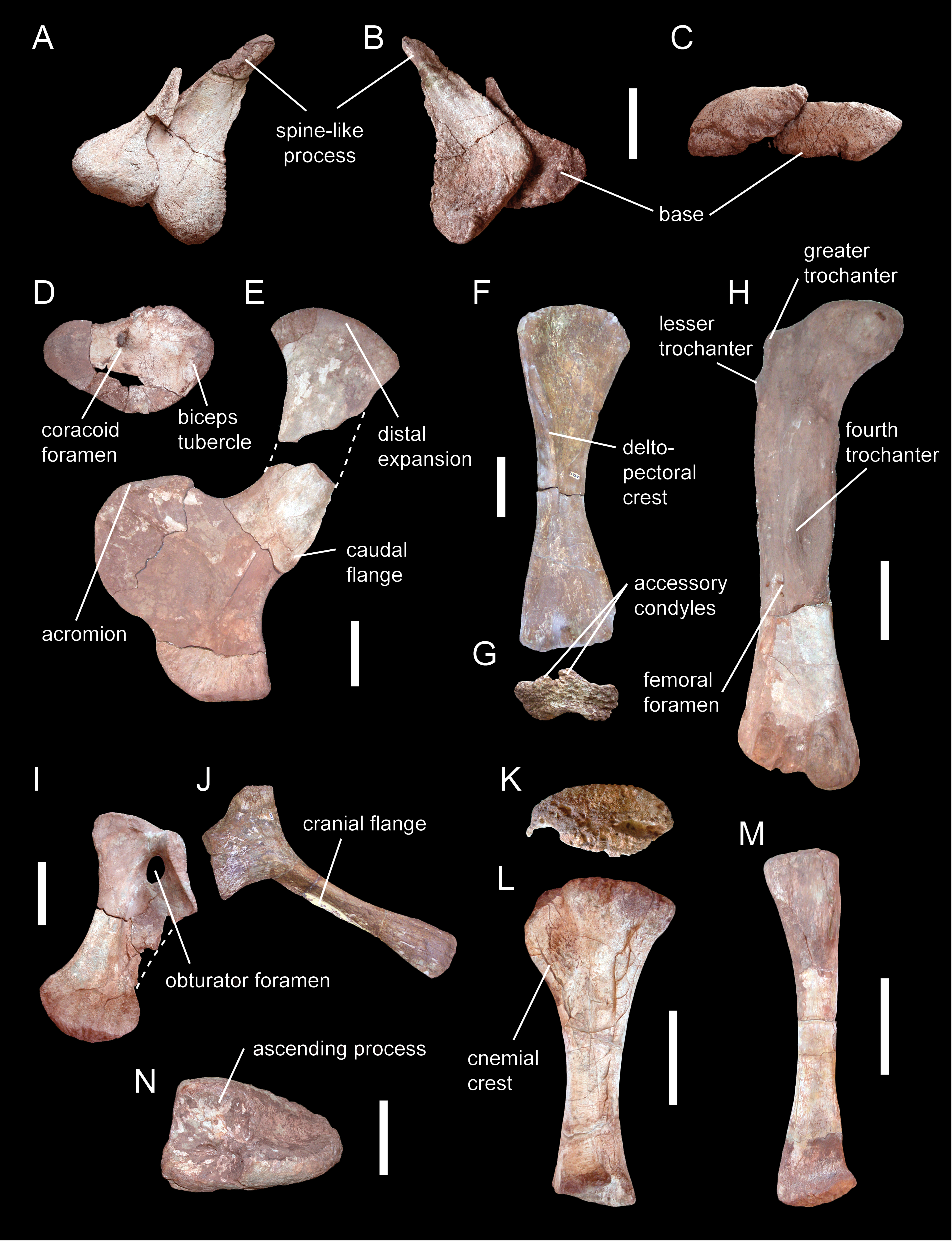
Appendicular skeleton of the basal sauropod Spinophorosaurus. A–C, Tail club osteoderm. D, left coracoid showing the coracoid foramen. E, left scapula showing the acromion. F–G, right humerus showing the deltopectoral crest. H, left femur showing the greater trochanter, the lesser trochanter, and the fourth trochanter. I, left pubis showing the obturator foramen. J, left ischium. K–L, left tibia showing the cnemial crest. M, left fibula.

femur
The femur (plural: femora) or thigh bone is the proximal element of the hind limb. Its proximal head features a large femoral head that is directed medially, forming a 90° angle with the shaft; the head is entering the acetabulum of the hip, forming the hip joint. The upper section of the femur features a number of trochanters (processes for muscle attachment):
- The lesser trochanter (also: anterior trochanter) is located on the anterior surface immediately below the head. A feature unique to dinosaurs and their immediate outgroups, it anchored the iliofemoralis muscle, which helped to abduct (splay) the legs. Many early dinosaurs additionally have a bony ridge or muscle scar known as a trochanteric shelf, which extends from the base of the anterior trochanter towards the posterolateral edge of the femur. The lesser trochanter in dinosaurs is not homologous to the lesser trochanter of mammals.
- The greater trochanter (also: dorsolateral trochanter) is a ridge or bulge on the lateral surface, opposite and continuous with the femoral head. It provided attachment for both the puboischiofemoralis and the ischiotrochantericus muscles, which draw the hind leg forwards and inwards.
- The fourth trochanter is an extensive flange on the posterior surface of the femur, directed rearwards. In dinosaurs, the fourth trochanter is distinctly asymmetrical, with the proximal part more expanded than the distal part. This is a synapomorphy of Dinosauria. The fourth trochanter provided attachment for the caudofemoralis longus muscle, the most important locomotor muscle that pulls the femur backwards when contracted, providing propulsion.
fibula
The fibula (plural: fibulae) or calf bone is a long bone located lateral to the tibia; together, the two bones form the lower leg. Generally more slender than the tibia, it is especially thin in derived theropods and birds.
foramen
A foramen (plural: foramina) is an opening in a bone for the passage of blood vessels, nerves, muscles, and similar entities. Nutrient foramina are openings allowing blood vessels to enter the inside of bones to enable nutrient supply to the bone.
frontal
The frontal is a paired dermal bone of the skull roof that lies between the nasal in front and the parietal at the back. Frontals are typically extensive and form the upper rim of the orbit as well as large parts of the roof of the braincase.
fontanelles
Fontanelles (also: fontanels) are gaps between bones—typically skull bones—that are primarily present in embryos but often close as the animal grows. Ceratopsians feature openings in between the frontal and parietal bones called the frontal fontanelles, which represent the openings of the supracranial cavity, a feature unique to the group.
fossa
Fossa (plural: fossae) is a general term for a depression or groove in bone surfaces.
furcula
The furcula (plural: furculae), or wishbone, is an unpaired, V-shaped bone of the chest region that connects the left and right shoulder blades. Found in birds and some dinosaurs, it is debated whether it is an interclavicle or if it formed by the fusion of the two clavicles.

== G ==
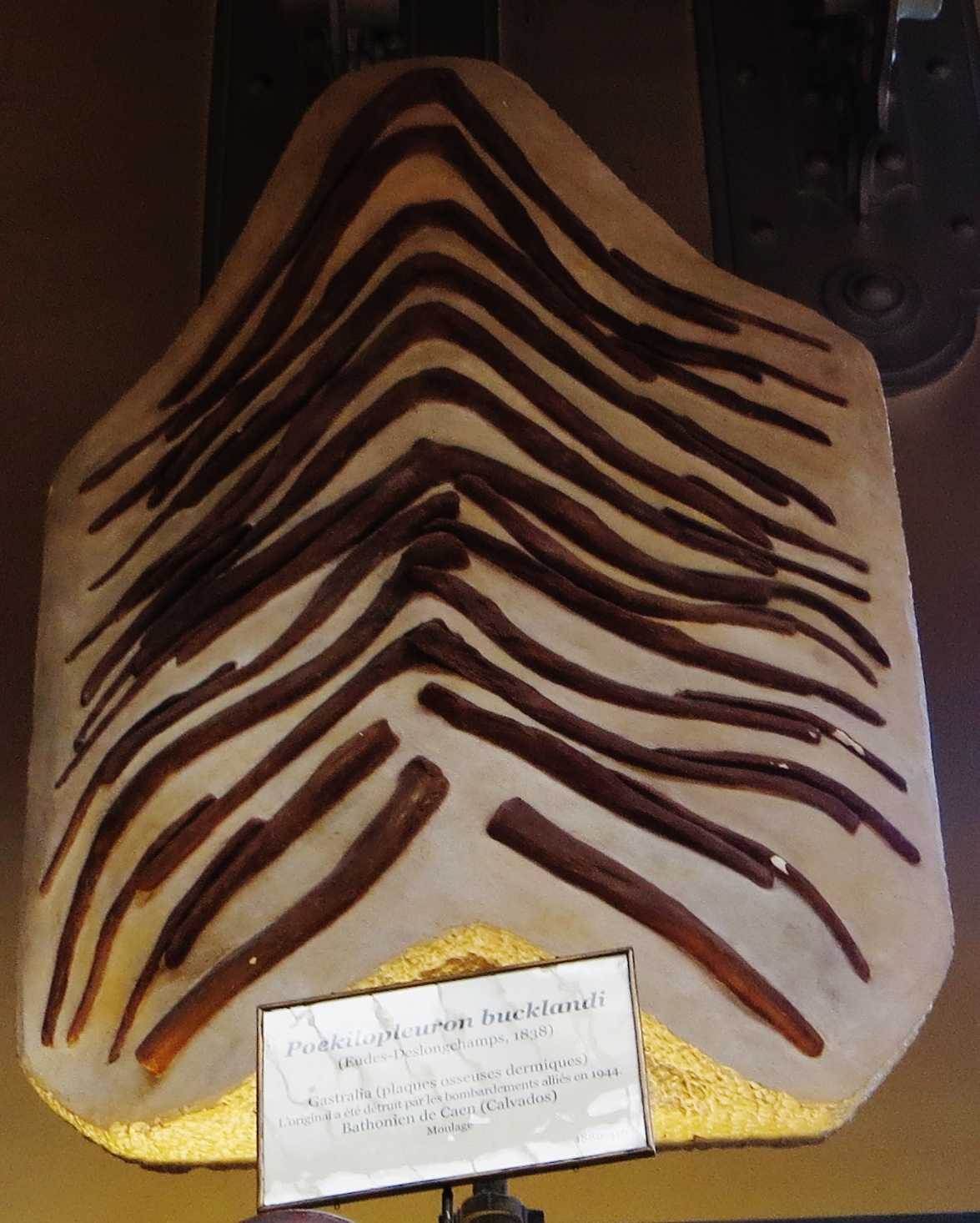
Gastralia of Poekilopleuron

gastralia
Gastralia (singular: gastralium) are dermal bones present within the dermis of the abdomen between the sternum and pubis. Gastralia are primitively present in dinosaurs and can be found in basal sauropodomorphs and theropods, but have been independently lost in sauropods, ornithischians, and neornithines (today's birds). When present, they are arranged in 8 to 21 rows, each of which consisting of four elements: A right and left medial gastralium articulate at the body midline in a zig-zag like fashion, while a lateral gastralium articulates with the lateral end of each medial gastralium. The first and last row may be fused into a single, bow-like structure termed a chevron-shaped gastralium. The use of the term "abdominal rib", which has been sometimes used for gastralia and other abdominal structures, is ambiguous thus discouraged.
glenoid
The glenoid is the articulation surface formed by the coracoid and scapula that receives the head of the humerus, forming the shoulder joint. A concave and circular structure, it is edged by a bony rim, and located on the posterior surface of the coracoid and the posterodistal surface of the scapula.

== H ==
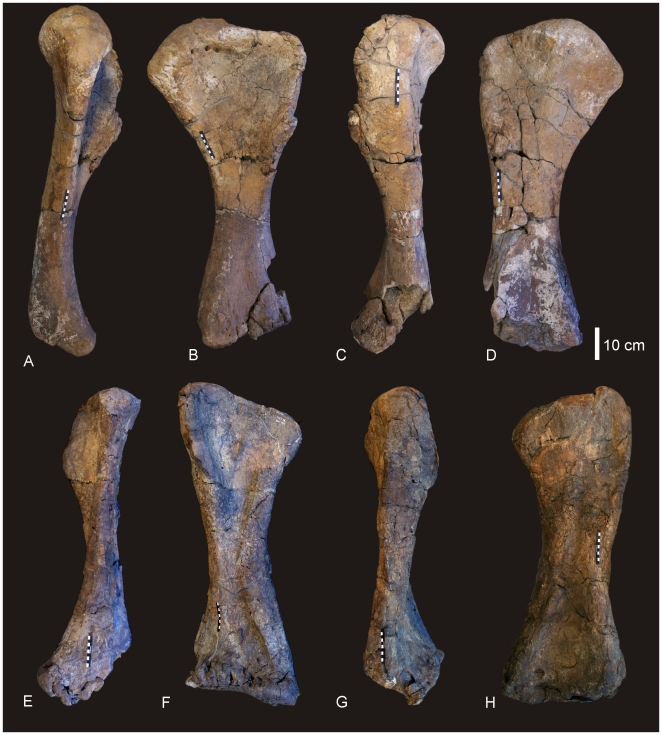
Humeri of Diamantinasaurus, shown at multiple angles

heel
The heel is the rear end of the foot. The term also refers to the rear end of a footprint, in which case it does not necessarily correlate with the anatomical heel, which is elevated above the ground in many dinosaurs.
horn
Horns are outgrowths of skull bones covered by a keratinous sheath. The bony core of the horn is termed the horn core. As the keratinous sheath is generally not preserved in fossils, its presence in a number of dinosaurs was inferred from comparisons to today's bovids. Other cranial outgrowths or rugosities may be covered by skin structures, as has been proposed for, e.g., the nasal boss of Pachyrhinosaurus and the domes of pachycephalosaurians.
humerus
The humerus (plural: humeri) is the single upper arm bone, and commonly the largest bone in the forelimb.
hyposphene-hypantrum articulation
Hyposphene-hypantrum articulations are accessory joints connecting neighboring vertebrae. They consist of a process on the posterior side of a vertebra, the hyposphene, that fits in a depression on the anterior side of the next vertebrae, the hypantrum. Hyposphene-hypantrum articulations occur in the dorsal vertebrae and sometimes also in the posteriormost cervical and anteriormost caudal vertebrae.
hyoid
Hyoids are bones of the throat region below and behind the skull that supported the tongue. These elements are seldom found in dinosaurs, as they are not articulated with the remaining skeleton and thus are easily lost.
hypex
A hypex (plural: hypexes or hypices) is the apex of the angle formed between two digits, or, in other words, the most proximal point of the space between two digits. The hypex can only be identified when soft tissue is present, and is thus mostly employed in the study of fossil footprints.

== I ==
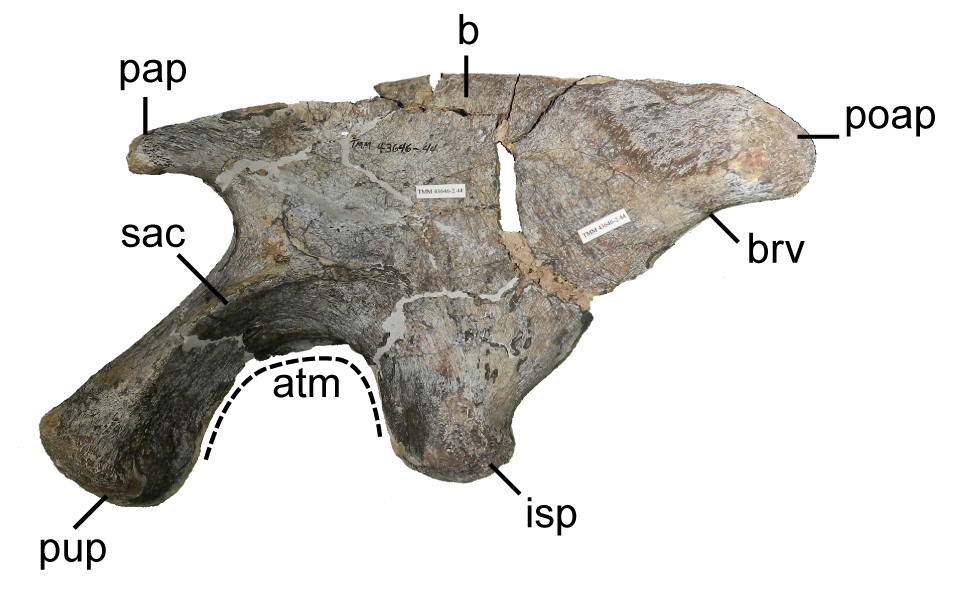
Left ilium of the basal sauropodomorph Sarahsaurus in lateral view. b – iliac blade, poap – postacetabular process, brv – brevis fossa, isp – ischiadic peduncle, atm – margin of acetabulum, pup – pubic peduncle, sac – supraacetabular ridge, pap – preacetabular process.

ilium
The ilium (plural: ilia) is the upper and largest bone of the hip. It consists of a main body, the iliac blade, whose medial side is attached to the sacral vertebrae. Ventrally, it forms a thickened, curved ridge overhanging the acetabulum, the supraacetabular ridge or crest, which distributes stresses transmitted through the femur of the hind limb. The anterior expansion of the iliac blade is termed the preacetabular process (also: preacetabular ala), and the posterior expansion the postacetabular process (also: postacetabular ala); both expansions allow for the optimal placement of the origins of limb muscles. In front of the acetabulum, a robust process, the pubic peduncle, is extending ventrally to attach to the pubis, while an ischiadic peduncle is extending behind the acetabulum to attach to the ischium. Immediately behind the acetabulum on the ischiadic peduncle lies the antitrochanter, an articular surface that extents ventrally onto the ischium and articulates with the greater trochanter of the femur. The ventral surface of the postacetabular process showed a depression termed the brevis fossa, where the caudofemoralis brevis muscle originated. Bordering the brevis fossa laterally is the brevis shelf, a ridge running along the ventrolateral margin of the ilium between the ischiadic peduncle and the rear end of the bone.
ischium
The ischium (plural: ischia) is one of three bones comprising the pelvis, and located below the ilium and behind the pubis. It is a rod-like element with an expanded shelf at its proximal end, the obturator plate, that makes contact with the ilium and pubis (a corresponding obturator plate is also found in the pubis). As the pubis, the left and right ischia are fused along their entire length. The expanded symphysis of the caudoventrally directed shaft is termed the ischiadic apron. The distal end of the ischium is often expanded into an ischial boot. The ventral surface of the shaft featured a longitudinal ridge, the obturator process. While proximally located in basal taxa, the obturator process is located on the distal end of the ischium in coelurosaurs.
infratemporal fenestra
The infratemporal fenestra (also: lateral temporal fenestra) is a major opening on the side of the skull behind the orbit. It is bordered by the postorbital in its upper front, the squamosal in its upper back, the quadratojugal in its lower back, and the jugal in its lower front corner.
intercentrum
Intercentra are part of the vertebral column found between centra in the cervical region of some dinosaurs. An intercentrum can often be found associated with the first cervical, though it can fuse to the centrum indistinguishably.
interclavicle
The interclavicle is a single, rod-like dermal bone located between the clacivles in the shoulder girdle. A primitive feature in tetrapods, interclavicles are generally assumed to be absent in dinosaurs, having been lost in Dinosauriformes. The presence of interclavicles in several dinosaur taxa has, however, been repeatedly suggested.
interdental plates
Interdental plates (also: transverse septa, rugosae) are bony plates on the lingual (inner) margin of the tooth row, that rise from the alveolar margin of the jaw to fill the region between the teeth.

== J ==
jugal
The jugal, or cheek-bone, is a skull bone that defines the lower border of the orbit and connects to the maxilla anteriorly and to the quadratojugal posteriorly. Its posterior end is bifurcated at its articulation with the quadratojugal, which is considered a synapomorphy of dinosaurs.

== L ==
lacrimal
The lacrimal is a strut-like bone in the skull separating the antorbital fenestra from the orbit. It is pierced by a canal for the lacrimal duct (tear duct), which connected the orbit with the antorbital fenestra. In some species the upper end of the lacrimal features a triangular crest or horn that rises above the skull roof.
laminae
Vertebral laminae (singular: lamina) or osseous septa (singular: osseus septum) are ridges on vertebrae that divide pneumatic chambers. They originate and terminate on different processes and regions of the vertebra depending on their terminology, and named from their points of start and finish. Laminae are divided into four arbitrary categories based on their terminus – diapophyseal laminae, parapophyseal laminae, zygapophyseal laminae and spinal laminae. They may also be divided into sublaminae if they split along their length, or composite laminae if more than one lamina forms a ridge. Example laminae:
- Spinoprezygapophyseal lamina (SPRL): lamina extending from the neural spine (spino-) to the prezygapophysis (-prezygapophyseal).
- Prespinal lamina (PRSL): lamina extending along the front surface (pre-) of the neural spine (-spinal).
- Posterior centrodiapophyseal lamina (PCDL): lamina extending from the posterior end (Posterior) of the centrum (centro-) to the diapophysis (-diapophyseal).
- Intrapostzygapophyseal lamina (TPOL): lamina extending between (intra-) the postzygapophyses (-postzygapophyseal).
- Prezygoparapophyseal lamina (PRPL): lamina extending from the prezygapophysis (Prezygo-) to the parapophysis (-parapophyseal).
laterosphenoid
The laterosphenoid (also: pleurosphenoid) is a wing-like bone of the anterior part of the lateral wall of the braincase. Not visible from the outside, it is located anterior to the prootic and contacts the parietal, frontal, and postorbital above. The laterosphenoid as a distinct ossification is unique to archosauriforms; in other reptiles this part of the neurocranial cartilage does not ossify.
ligamentum elasticum interlaminare
The ligamentum elasticum interlaminare (sometimes shortened to ligamentum elasticum) is a ligament composed of unpaired bundles that connect the neural spines of adjacent vertebrae in dinosaurs and birds. This ligament spans the neck and tail, and in modern birds maintains the concavity of the neck. Release of this ligament during decay was proposed to result in the characteristic death poses where the spine is strongly curved.

Diagram of the forelimb of Allosaurus showing the principal segments of the limb

limb
The limbs form, together with the girdles, part of the appendicular skeleton. Fore- and hind limbs are very similar in structure, and are segmented into three principal parts. The upper limb, the stylopodium, consists of the humerus (forelimb) or the femur (hind limbs), while the lower limb, the zeugopodium, consists of ulna and radius (forelimb) or tibia and fibula (hind limb). The distal part is the autopodium, comprising the hands or feet. The autopodium itself is subdivided into three segments: the carpalia (forelimb) or tarsalia (hind limb) form the basipodium; the metacarpalia (forelimb) or metatarsalia (hind limb) the metapodium; and the phalanges of the digits the acropodium. An aberrant terminology was proposed by Günter Wagner and Chi-Hua Chiu in 2001. Here, the autopodium is subdivided into only two sections, the mesopodium comprising the nodular elements (the carpus or tarsus), and the acropodium, which under this definition comprises all autopodial long bones, including both the metacarpalia (or metatarsalia) and the phalanges.

== M ==
maxilla
The maxilla (plural: maxillae) is the posterior, and usually largest, tooth-bearing bone of the upper jaw. Anteriorly, it connects to the premaxilla and often contributes to the border of the external naris. Over most of its length, the maxilla forms the ventral limits of the antorbital fenestra as well as the depression surrounding this opening, the antorbital fossa, which is deeply recessed within the maxilla. In derived theropods, the maxilla may feature two smaller, additional openings, the promaxillary fenestra and the maxillary fenestra. At its posterior end, the maxilla articulates with the jugal and the lacrimal.
mandible
The mandible, or lower jaw, is the part of the skull below the cranium. Each half of the mandible, termed a mandibular ramus (plural: mandibular rami; from Latin "branch") or hemimandible, is connected to the quadrate at the back of the skull to form the jaw joint. At the front, both mandibular rami are attached to each other; the region of attachment is termed the mandibular symphysis. The mandible consists of both endochondral bones, which ossified from the Meckelian cartilage, and dermal bones. In dinosaurs, only the dentary bears teeth.
mandibular fenestra
The external mandibular fenestra is an opening in the lower jaw between the dentary, surangular, and angular bones. It is characteristic for archosauriforms, and present in most groups of dinosaurs.
manus
The manus (plural: manus), or hand, comprises the carpals, metacarpals, and manual phalanges of the digits. The first digit is the pollex (or thumb).
Meckelian groove
The Meckelian groove is a longitudinal channel within the lower jaw. It housed the unossified remnants of the Meckelian cartilage (also: Meckel's cartilage), from which the endochondral elements of the lower jaw ossified. The anterior part of the Meckelian groove is exposed on the medial side of the dentary close to the ventral margin of the bone, while the posterior part is enclosed by bone on both sides, only to open dorsally through the adductor fossa.
mesethmoid
The mesethmoid is a bone in the anterior part of the braincase. It is located beneath the frontal bones and in front of the sphenethmoid, and articulates with the interorbital septum anteriorly. The mesethmoid is composed of a horizontal dorsal plate located directly beneath the frontals from which a median septum (a thin wall of bone at the skull midline) extends ventrally to make contact with the basisphenoid. As is the case with the sphenethmoid and the orbitosphenoid, the mesethmoid is not ossified in many species and thus rarely preserved; it is however commonly found in birds.
metacarpal
The metacarpals are the long bones of the hand, forming the palm. Together they are called the metacarpus, and are situated between the carpals and the phalanges of the digits. They are identified with Roman numerals from I–V, with metacarpal I the innermost (connecting to the thumb) and metacarpal V the outermost.
metatarsal
The metatarsals are the long bones of the foot. Together called the metatarsus (plural: metatarsi), they connect the tarsals with the digits. As is the case with the metacarpals of the hand, metatarsals are identified with Roman numerals from I–V, where metatarsal I is the innermost (connecting to the thumb toe) and metatarsal V the outermost.

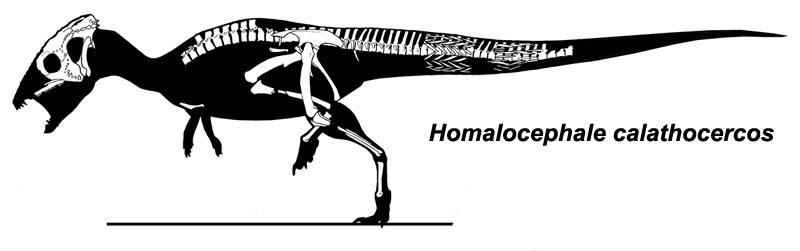
Skeletal reconstruction of the pachycephalosaur Homalocephale, showing a caudal basket of myorhabdoi of the tail

myorhabdoi
Myorhabdoi (also: myorhabdoid ossifications) are bones found in the tail of pachycephalosaurs. Multiple myorhabdoi form a meshlike structure surrounding (but not connecting to) the vertebral column which has sometimes been called a caudal basket. Myorhabdoi form within the myosepta (connective tissues separating blocks of muscle tissue, the myomeres), and represent ossified myoseptal tendons. Therefore, myorhabdoi form in the periphery of the muscle tissue below the dermis (and not within the dermis, as is the case in osteoderms). They are also distinct from ossified tendons, which stiffened the tail in other ornithischian dinosaurs, although they may have had similar functions. Myorhabdoi are primarily known from teleost fish; pachycephalosaurs are the only known tetrapods where these structures ossify. An articulated caudal basket is known from Homalocephale.

== N ==
nasal
The paired nasal is the frontmost bone of the skull roof, and the largest bone of the top surface of the snout. It is situated between the premaxilla in front and the frontal behind.
neural arch
The neural arch is the arch-shaped upper component of a vertebra, lying above the spinal canal and centrum. In adult dinosaurs, the centrum and neural arch typically fuse together, closing up the neurocentral suture which lies between the components in juveniles. The neural arch may host an assortment of bony processes, such as the neural spines, epipophyses, transverse processes (which connect to the ribs, and zygapophyses (which articulate with adjacent vertebrae). Dinosaur have complex neural arches, often ornamented with a system of laminae, fossae, and/or pleurocoels which define air sacs that lie along the vertebrae.
neural spine
Neural spines (also: spinous processes) are processes rising upward from the top surface of the vertebral neural arch. Singular processes, they form a single row along the midline of the spine, with their tips generally being the highest points of the individual vertebrae. Neural spines provide attachment surfaces for muscles and ligaments running atop the spine. In some species, they can be greatly elongated to form a sail, or deeply bifurcated so that their top parts form a double row.
neurocentral suture
The neurocentral suture is the separation between the centrum and neural arch of each vertebra. Juvenile dinosaurs typically have "open" (unfused) neurocentral sutures, which become "closed" (fused) as they reach adulthood.
nuchal crest
The transverse nuchal crest is a ridge at the back of the skull found in many theropods. Oriented transversally (perpendicular to the skull midline), it forms the border between the skull roof and the occipital region. It is mainly formed by the rear margin of the parietals with contributions by the squamosals. The crest anchors neck musculature, and its rear face may contain fossae for attachment of the nuchal ligament. The transverse nuchal crest is not to be confused with the sagittal nuchal crest, a midline ridge on the supraoccipital.
nuchal ligament
The nuchal ligament is an elastic ligament that stretches from the back of the skull to the rear part of the neck above the vertebral column.

== O ==
occiput
The occiput is an area on the back side of the skull. It consists of four bones surrounding the foramen magnum, the passage for the spinal cord that opens into the brain cavity: the supraoccipital on top, the paired exoccipitals on the sides, and the basioccipital below. Directly below the foramen magnum is a spherical, knob-like process, the occipital condyle, which articulates with the atlas, the first vertebrae of the neck. The occipital condyle is mainly formed by the basioccipital, with smaller contributions by the exoccipitals on the top edges.
opisthotic
The opisthotic is a paired bone of the rear of the braincase. In adult dinosaurs, it is always fused with the paired exoccipitals, forming a structure known as the exoccipital-opisthotics. Together with the exoccipitals, the opisthotics form a pair of large wing-like processes extending backwards and sidewards from the braincase, the paroccipital processes. These processes make contact with the parietal, squamosal, and quadrate.
orbitosphenoid
The orbitosphenoid (deprecated: presphenoid) is a bone of the anterior part of the braincase that underlies the forebrain. A paired bone, the left and right halves enclose the canal for the second cranial nerve (optic nerve). In dinosaurs it only ossifies occasionally.

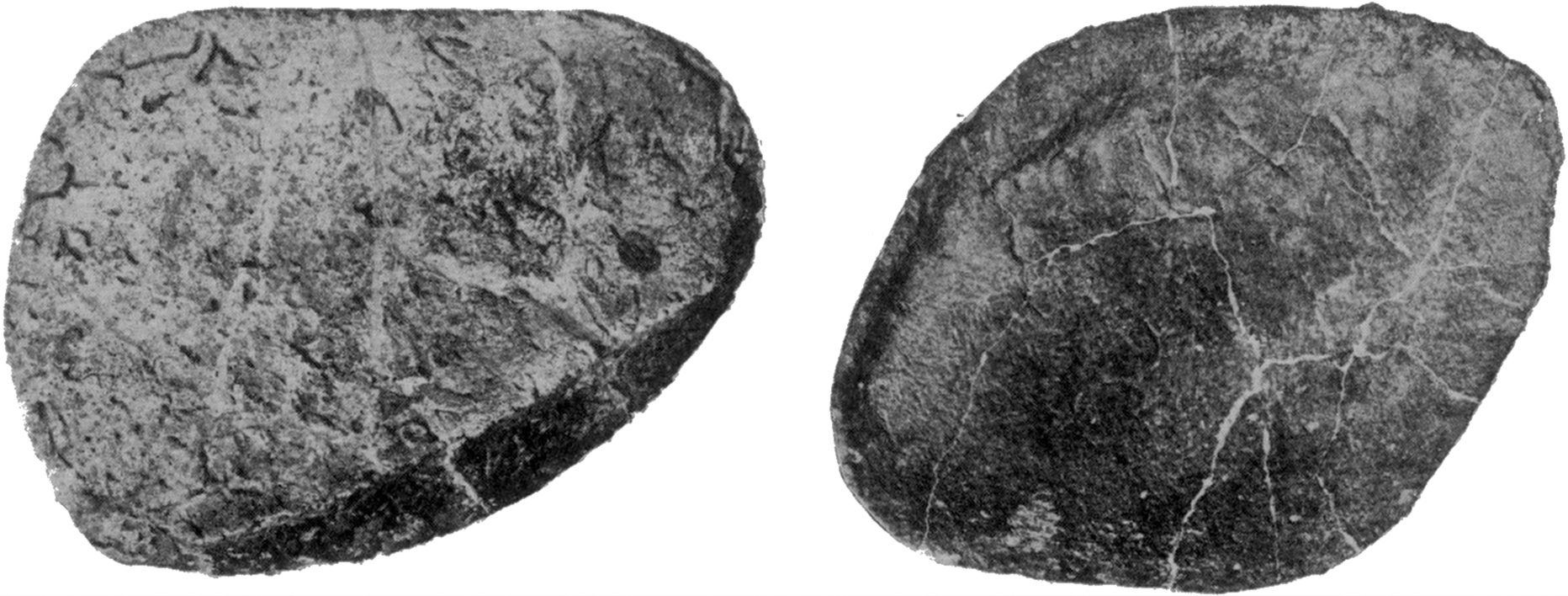
Osteoderm of Ankylosaurus

osteoderm
Osteoderms are bones forming in the dermis of the skin. They can form plate or spike-like structures in some species, most extremely in the armored ankylosaurs. Small and irregular osteoderms less than 1 cm (or 5–15 mm) in diameter are known as ossicles.
ossified tendons
Ossified tendons are bony rods bracing and stiffening the vertebral column. Their presence on the upper sides of the vertebrae is considered a synapomorphy of ornithischians.
otic capsule
The otic capsule is the thickened side region of the braincase that contains the inner ear. It is composed of two ossifications, the prootic in front and the opisthotic behind. Between both bones lies the fenestra ovalis, a large opening receiving the stapes.

== P ==
pad
A pad is a fleshy swelling on the underside of a hand or foot that is commonly observed in footprints. Depending on the part of the hand or foot they support, they are described as palm pads, sole pads, or digital pads. A digit may feature discrete phalangeal pads (also: digital nodes) that can correspond to individual phalanges (finger/toe bones). In dinosaurs, phalangeal pads typically show an arthral arrangement, with a pad enclosing the joint between two phalanges. Humans, on the other hand, show the mesarthral arrangement, were the transition from one pad to the next occurs beneath the joint. A pad enclosing the joint between a metacarpal (or metatarsal) and the first phalanx is termed a metatarsophalangeal pad.
palate
The palate is the part of the skull between the left and right upper jaws that forms the roof of the mouth. It consists of one unpaired bone, the vomer, and five paired bones (palatine, pterygoid, ectopterygoid, epipterygoid, and quadrate). The palate features three pairs of openings, namely the choanae or internal nostrils, the suborbital fenestrae between the palatines and ectopterygoids, and the subtemporal fenestrae behind the ectopterygoids, which are continuous with the infratemporal fenestrae.
palatine
The palatine is a paired, dermal bone of the palate. It contacts the vomer and pterygoid medially and the maxilla and jugal laterally, and forms the posterior margin of the choanae as well as the anterior margin of the suborbital fenestrae.
palpebral
The palpebral (also: supraorbital, adlacrimal) is a small bone attached to, or forming parts of, the upper margin of the orbit (eye socket). Forming in the upper eyelid, it is originally derived from osteoderms. There may be one or several palpebrals at either side of the skull. The presence of a palpebral is a synapomorphy of ornithischians, although palpebrals also evolved in other reptile clades, including crocodyliformes.
parapophysis
Parapophyses are processes on the centra of the cervical and dorsal vertebrae that articulate with the capitulum of the ribs. They are typically located close to the front margin of the side surface of the centrum, and well separated from the diapophyses on the transverse processes of the neural arches, which receive the second rib head, the tuberculum. However, the position of the parapophysis gradually shifts onto the transverse process along the spine from the cervical to the posterior dorsal vertebrae, where it may form a single structure with the diapophysis that receives a single-headed rib.
parasphenoid
The parasphenoid is the only dermal bone of the braincase. It forms part of the underside of the braincase, being located in front of the basisphenoid and extending forwards beneath the eyes in an elongated process. This process supported a membrane that extended dorsally to the skull roof, separating the right and left eyeballs. This membrane may be ossified, when it is called an interorbital septum.
parietal
The paired parietal is the hindmost bone of the skull roof. A dermal bone, it is located behind the frontals, and roofs the braincase.
parietal fenestrae
The parietal fenestrae are a pair of window-like openings commonly found in the neck frills of ceratopsians. In Chasmosaurus and Pentaceratops, these openings were especially large.
pectoral girdle
The pectoral girdle, or shoulder girdle, is the set of bones of the appendicular skeleton that connects to the forelimbs. In the strict sense, the pectoral girdle includes the scapula, coracoid, and clavicle, while the sternum is variously referred to either the pectoral girdle or, together with the ribs, the axial skeleton. Unlike the pelvic girdle, which is rigidly anchored on the spine, the pectoral girdle has no such bony connection but instead is suspended by muscles.
pelvis
The pelvis, also known as the pelvic girdle, is the collective term for bones of the hip, which connect the vertebral column to the hindlimb. The pelvis includes the ilium, pubis, and ischium. Its inner surface has a strong connection to sacral ribs of the sacral vertebrae, which may be fused into a sacrum.
pes
The pes (plural: pedes), or foot, comprises the tarsals, metatarsals, and pedal phalanges. The first digit of the foot is the hallux, which is short and not contacting the ground in most bipedal dinosaurs, but enlarged and reversed (pointing backwards instead of forwards) in birds.
phalanges
The phalanges (singular: phalanx) are the bones of the digits of the hands and feet. The ultimate phalanx of a digit called an ungual and formed the bony core of a horny hoof or claw.
pineal foramen
The pineal foramen (also: frontoparietal foramen; parietal foramen; postfrontal foramen; interfrontal foramen) is an unpaired opening at the midline of the skull roof present in some dinosaurs, but often closed in adults. Its position is variable; it can be located between the frontals, the parietals, or at the junction between frontals and parietals. This opening exposed the parietal organ, and thus served for photoreception.
pleurocoel
Pleurocoels are openings on the side surfaces of the vertebra that lead into internal chambers within the centrum and/or neural arch of the vertebra. A pleurocoel may be a single cavity or a complex of smaller, interconnected cavities.
postcranium
The postcranium ("behind the cranium"; plural: postcrania) is the part of the skeleton that follows behind the skull. It is subdivided into the axial skeleton, which includes the entirety of the vertebrae and ribs, and the appendicular skeleton, which includes girdles and limbs. Furthermore, individual specimens found without a skull are often referred to as postcrania.
postorbital
The postorbital is a paired bone on the side of the skull that forms much of the back margin of the orbit. In ceratopsians, it is modified to form prominent horns above the eyes.

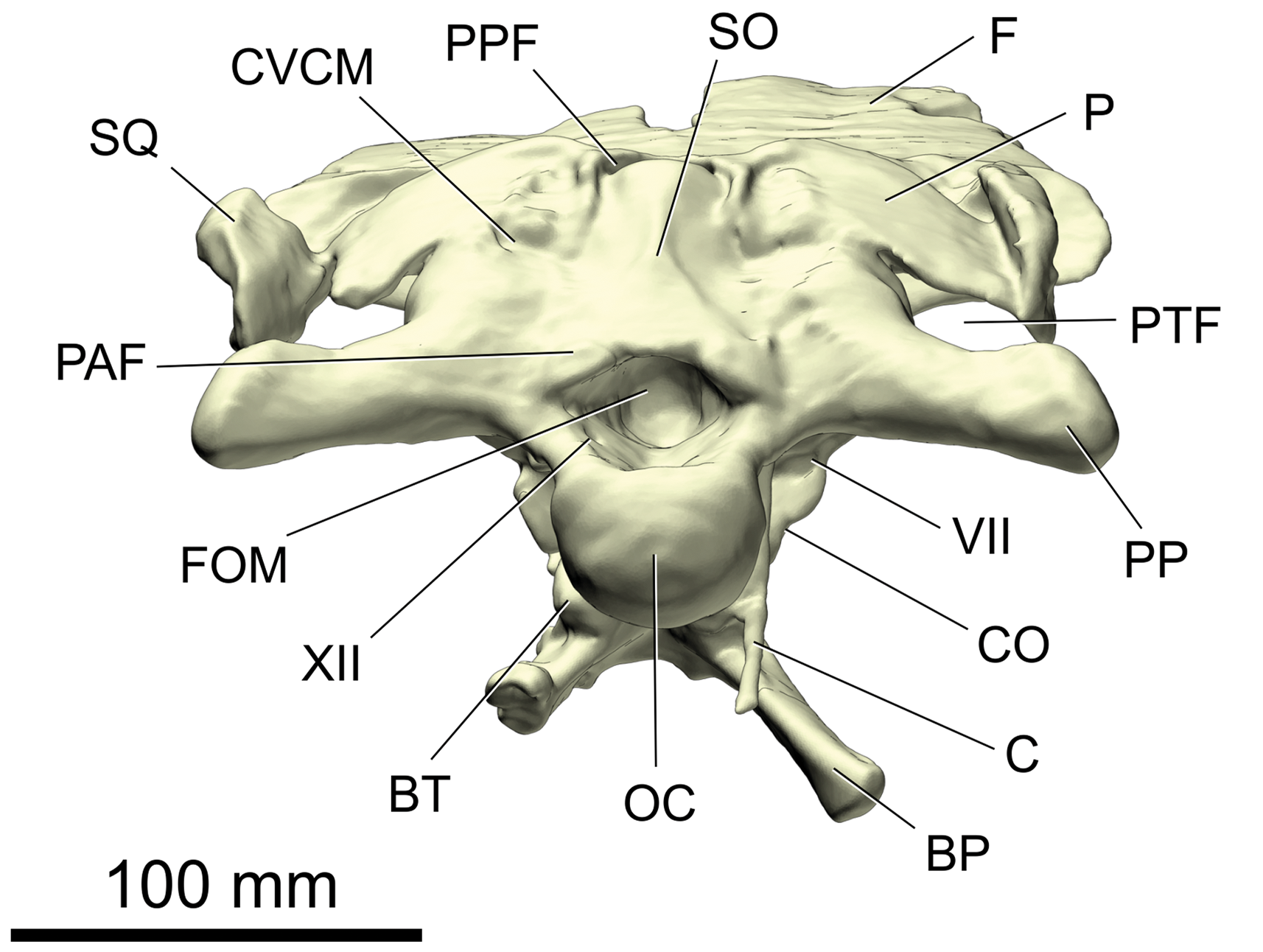
Braincase of the sauropod Spinophorosaurus in rear view, showing the postparietal foramen (PPF) and the posttemporal fenestra (PTF)

postparietal foramen
The postparietal foramen (also: postparietal fontanelle, postparietal fenestra) is an unpaired opening located at the skull midline between the parietal and the supraoccipital that is found in some sauropodomorphs. As is true for the pineal foramen, it possibly exposed the parietal organ, and thus served for photoreception.
posttemporal fenestra
The posttemporal fenestra (alternative spelling: post-temporal fenestra) is a paired opening located below the rear edge of the parietal of the skull roof and above the paroccipital process of the braincase. It possibly represents the exit of the occipital ramus of the ophthalmic artery.
prearticular
The prearticular is a bone of the rear portion of the lower jaw. Exposed on the inner side of the latter, it sits in front of the articular and above the angular. It forms the inner margin of the adductor fossa.
prefrontal
The prefrontal is a smaller bone on the side margin of the skull roof between the frontal, lacrimal, and nasal.
predentary
The predentary is an unpaired bone found in front of the dentaries of the lower jaw that formed the lower beak in ornithischians. Its presence is considered an ornithischian synapomorphy.
premaxilla
The paired premaxilla (plural: premaxillae) is the frontmost bone of the upper jaw and forms the tip of the snout. It contains the front part of the upper tooth row, which is continuous with that of the maxilla, which follows behind.
proatlas
The proatlas is a small paired bone sitting in between the neural arch of the atlas (the first vertebra) and the base of the skull. The elements of each pair are triangular in shape, with the broad end articulating with the neural arch of the atlas, and the acute end with the exoccipital of the skull. Given its small size, the proatlas is easily lost during fossilization, collection or preservation and thus rarely been found.
prootic
The prootic is a paired bone forming parts of the side surface of the braincase. Together with the opisthotic, which is located behind it, the prootic forms the otic capsule. The prootic contains openings for the trigeminal and facial nerves, and is internally excavated by sinuses. Its external surface provided rough attachment surfaces for muscles opening the jaw.
pterygoid
The pterygoid is a dermal, paired bone of the palate. Large and complex, it articulates with both the braincase and other bones of the palate. At their rear portion, the left and right pterygoid enclose an opening, the interpterygoid vacuity.
pubis
The pubis (plural: pubes) is one of the three bones that comprise the pelvis, and located ventral to the ilium and anterior to the ischium. In saurischians, the pubic shaft is primitively directed forward (the propubic condition). In ornithischians, the original pubic shaft is pointing backwards (the opisthopubic condition); instead, a well-developed anterior ramus or prepubis is present, which can be larger than the posteriorly directed shaft in derived forms. The left and right pubes are usually fused along their entire length, with the distal portion being expanded, forming the pubic apron. In some neotheropods, the distal section of the suture is not continuous but forms a fenestra, the pubic foramen, that is visible in ventral view. The proximal part of the pubis features an opening, the obturator foramen, which is located close to the acetabulum and visible in lateral view. The obturator foramen allows for the passage of the obturator nerve. In theropods, the obturator foramen is not completely surrounded by bone as the ventral border is lacking; this condition is termed an obturator notch.
pygostyle
A pygostyle is a bony structure composed of the fused hindmost caudal vertebra. It is found in pygostylian birds, where it functions in anchoring long tail feathers.

== Q ==
quadrate
The quadrate is a large, paired, and endochondral bone at the back of the skull. A columnar structure, its lower end articulates with the lower jaw, forming the jaw joint, while its upper end reaches beneath the squamosal. The quadrate is part of the palate.
quadratojugal
The quadratojugal is a bone in the cheek region of the skull that is visible in side view, forming the lower rear corner of the cranium.

== R ==
radius
The radius (plural: radii) is the smaller and anterior of the two bones of the forearm.
rhamphotheca
The rhamphotheca (plural: rhamphothecae) or beak is a horny (keratinous) covering on the tips of the jaws commonly found in ornithischians, ornithomimosaurs, and birds. As keratin rarely fossilizes, beaks are only preserved as impressions. The presence of beaks is often inferred from the roughened surface texture of the jaw tips, which are strongly vascularized (containing numerous blood vessels).

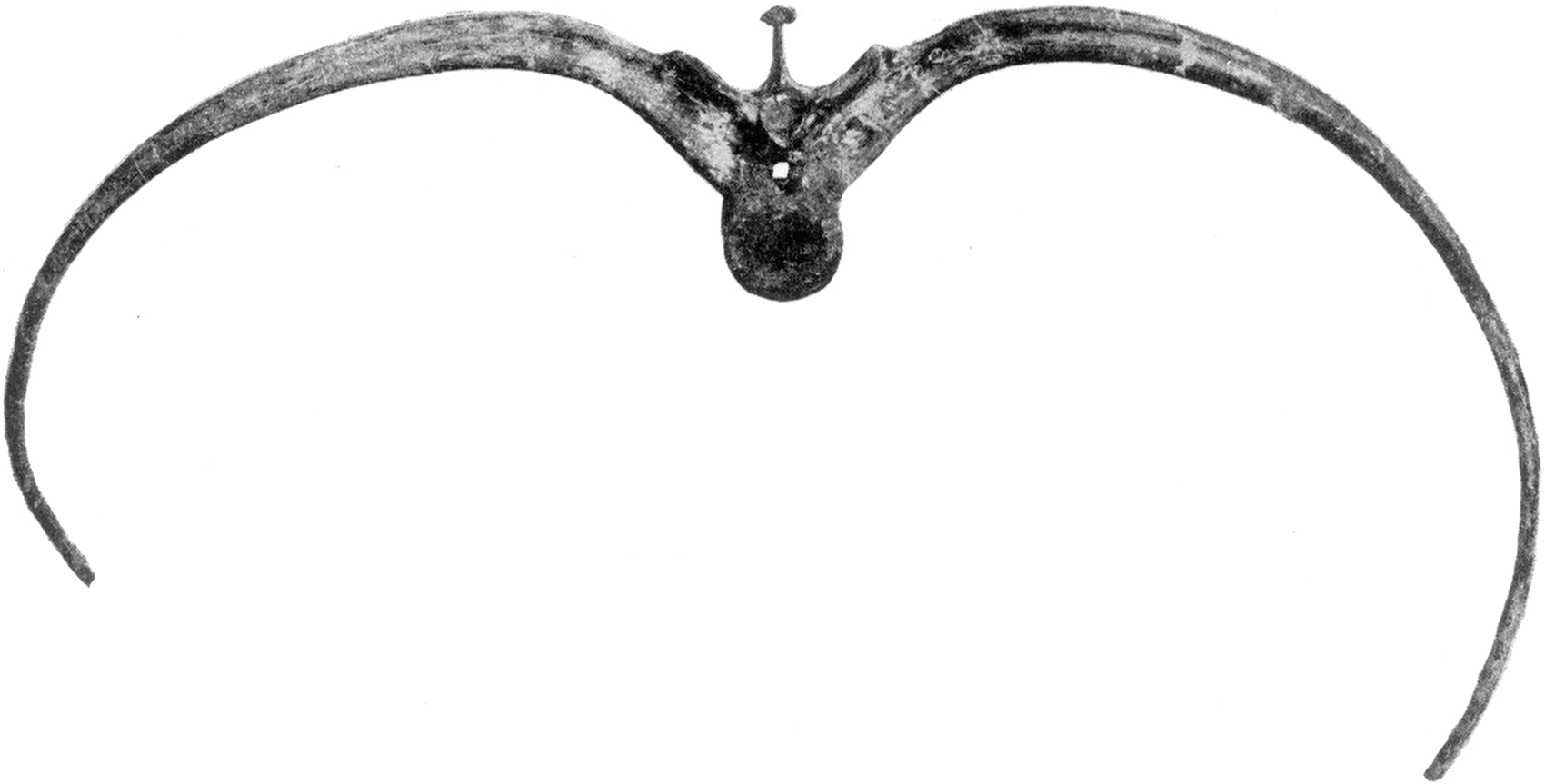
Ribs and a dorsal vertebra of Ankylosaurus

ribs
Dorsal ribs or costae (singular: costa; this Latin term is less commonly used than the English term "ribs") attach to both sides of the dorsal vertebrae and provide protection for organs located in the trunk. Ribs are bicapitate (two-headed): A dorsal head, the tuberculum (plural: tubercula), articulates with the transverse processes of the neural arch, while a ventral head, the capitulum (plural: capitula) articulates with the centrum. Ribs are also present in the neck (cervical ribs) and sacrum (sacral ribs).
rostral
The rostral bone is a novel bone found in ceratopsians. An unpaired element, it caps the front of the premaxillae at the tip of the snout. When used as an adjective, the term rostral refers to the rostrum. The rostral and other accessory ossifications attached to the skulls of ceratopsians are collectively termed epiossifications.
rostrum
The rostrum (plural: rostra) is the snout region of the skull.

== S ==
sacrals
The sacrals, or sacral vertebrae, of the vertebral column are located between the dorsal and caudal vertebrae. They are frequently fused together into a structure known as the sacrum (plural: sacra). Sometimes one or more dorsal vertebrae are fused to the sacrum into a structure termed a synsacrum.

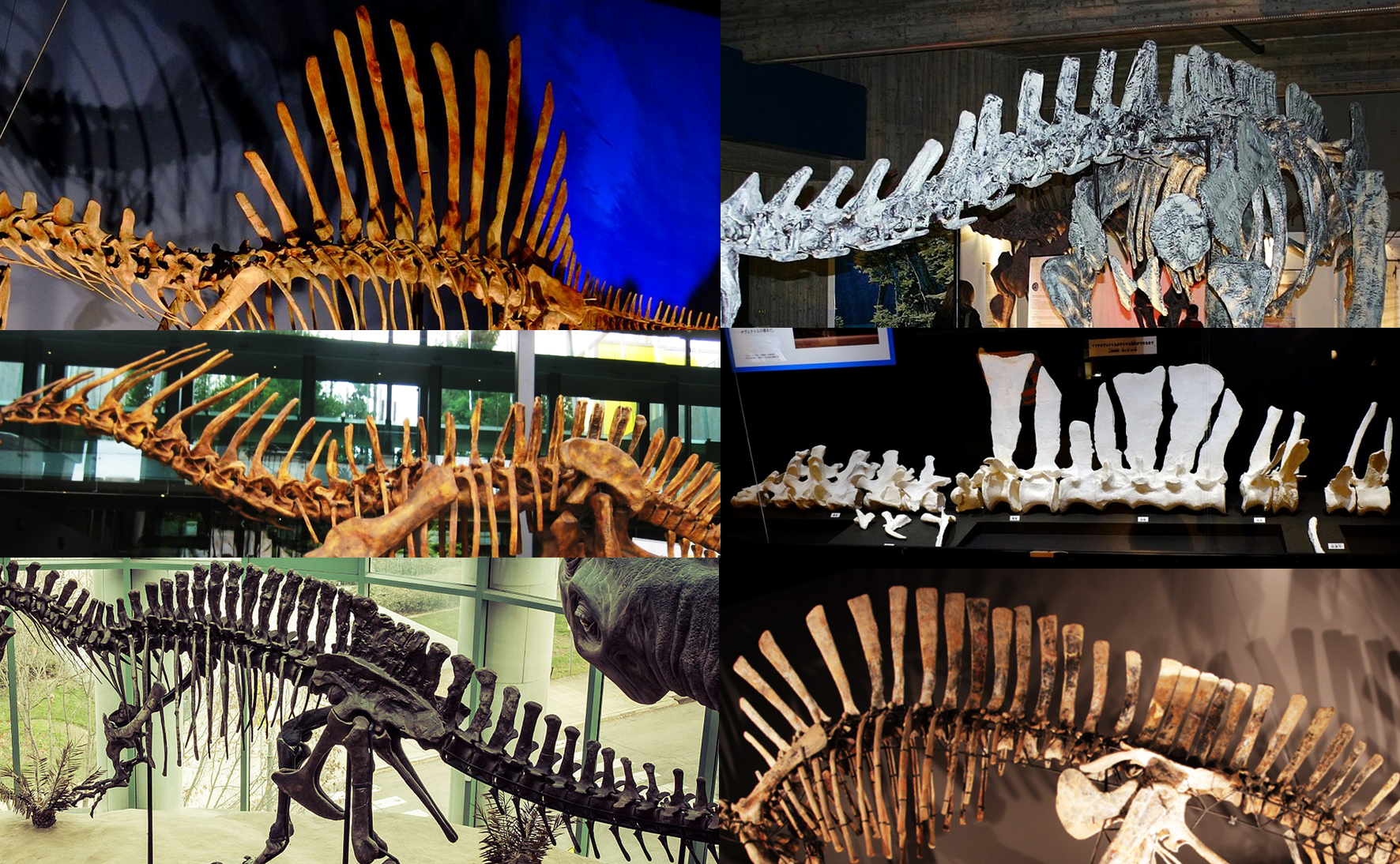
Variation in neural spine sails across Dinosauria, clockwise from bottom left: Acrocanthosaurus, Amargasaurus, Spinosaurus, Limaysaurus, Ichthyovenator, and Ouranosaurus

sail
Sails (also: neural spine sails) are structures resulting from elongation of the vertebral neural spines, typically in the dorsal, sacral, and caudal vertebrae. They vary in size and shape, from shallow ridges to tall, conspicuous structures. In some cases, such as in Concavenator, the neural spines form a "hump" or, such as in Ichthyovenator, a sinusoidal (wave-like) sail. The condition is most prominent in spinosaurid theropods, but also occurs in carcharodontosaurids, metriacanthosaurids, and a few ornithopod and sauropod dinosaurs.
scapula
The scapula (plural: scapulae), or shoulder blade, is an endochondral bone and the largest element of the pectoral girdle. In adults, the scapula is usually fused to the coracoid, forming the scapulocoracoid.
scleral ring
A scleral ring (also: sclerotic ring) is a ring of small plate-like bones located on eye within the sclera and around the pupil. The individual plate-like bones are termed scleral ossicles.
secondary palate
A secondary palate is a roof-like structure separating the nasal airways from the mouth. Primitively in reptiles, the choanae open into the oral cavity at the front of the mouth, admitting that food items may block the air passages while feeding. A secondary palate, as it is commonly found in mammals, shifts the choanae backwards, allowing for feeding and breathing simultaneously. In several clades, including ankylosaurians, spinosaurids, and maniraptoriform coelurosaurs, the secondary palate was bony and termed an osseous secondary palate. In contrast, a soft secondary palate was inferred for some other taxa such as Plateosaurus and Stegosauria based on projections and ridges of the palatal bones. An osseous secondary palate is typically formed by shelf-like extensions of the premaxillae and maxillae that meet with the vomer at the skull midline. Ankylosaurids developed a novel additional part of the secondary palate that extends forward from the pterygoid and palatine at the rear part of the palate, and has been termed the caudoventral palatal shelf (correspondingly, the anterior part formed by the premaxillae and maxillae is also termed the rostrodorsal palatal shelf).
serrations
Serrations are small protuberances arranged in lines along the cutting edges (carinae) of teeth. A closely related term is denticle (also: dentelures). Both terms have been defined in different ways, with many authors using them as synonyms. Other authors applied the term "serration" to the smaller structures of carnivorous teeth and the term "denticles" to the coarser protuberances seen in many herbivorous teeth. A recent terminological review defines denticles as a complex type of serration that is formed by both the enamel and the underlying dentine, while the term serration also encompasses structures solely formed from enamel. According to this definition, the protuberances seen in carnivorous dinosaurs should be termed denticles. A detailed terminology is employed to describe the complex denticle morphology of carnivorous teeth:
- cellae (singular: cella; also: interdenticular space): The spaces between individual denticles.
- diaphysis (plural: diaphyses): The point where the enamel caps of two neighboring denticles diverge or are closest to each other.
- ampulla (plural: ampullae): The flask-shaped chamber beneath the diaphysis.
- operculum: The enamel layer of the denticle.
- radix: the core of the denticle beneath the operculum.
- interdenticular sulcus (plural: sulci, also: blood groove): A groove that runs from the spaces between neighboring denticles a short distance onto the tooth surface at both sides perpendicular to the carina.
- cauda (plural: caudae): a bulge arising from the base of a denticle and running perpendicular to the carina onto the tooth surface between two interdenticular sulci.

Annotated skull diagram of Dromaeosaurus in lateral view showing bones and skull openings.

skull
The skull encompasses the bones and teeth of the head. It is composed of an upper part, the cranium (plural: crania), as well as a lower part, the mandible. The cranium consists of braincase, the skull roof, the upper jaw and cheek region; and the palate. The braincase is almost completely of endochondral origin, while the remainder of the cranium is predominantly composed of dermal bones. The mandibles are composed of both dermal and endochondral bones. The skull features a number of openings, which are important landmarks in anatomical descriptions. These include the orbit (plural: orbita), or eye socket, which housed the eye, as well as the external naris. In addition, the skull featured additional openings, or fenestrae (singular: fenestra), that were typical for diapsid reptiles: the antorbital fenestra between the external naris and the orbit; the infratemporal fenestra behind the orbit, and the supratemporal fenestra at the back of the skull roof.
skull roof
The skull roof is the upper surface of the skull. In dinosaurs, it consists of four paired bones: The nasals, frontals, and parietals are large elements, while the prefrontals are small and situated between the nasal, frontal, and lacrimal. In the rear part of the skull are the supratemporal fenestrae.
sphenethmoid
The sphenethmoid is a tube-shaped bone at the front part of the braincase. Located beneath the frontal bones, behind the mesethmoid, and in front of the orbitosphenoid, it contained the olfactory bulbs, which housed the sense of smell. As is the case with the mesethmoid and the orbitosphenoid, the sphenethmoid is not ossified in many species and thus rarely preserved.
splenial
The splenial is a dermal bone of the lower jaw that is located behind and medial (towards the inside) of the dentary. The splenial covers most of the inner side of the dentary, and is often the most extensive bone of the lower jaw in medial view.
squamosal
The squamosal is a paired bone at the rear corners of the skull.
sternum
The sternum, referred to as sternal plates when unfused, is a bone in the pectoral girdle. The sternum is usually cartilaginous in reptiles, so its absence and relationship with the clavicle may not always be known.
subnarial foramen
The subnarial foramen is a small opening between the premaxilla and maxilla in saurischians and some basal ornithischians.

Diagram of three taxa displaying subnarial gaps.

subnarial gap
The subnarial gap (also termed a "kink") is a gap between the premaxilla and maxilla in the snouts of coelophysoid, dilophosaurid, and spinosaurid theropods. The subnarial gap results in a diastema, a gap in the tooth row. The space between the subnarial gap of the snout and the upwards curving tip of the mandible is called the subrostral notch. In Dilophosaurus, the gap contained a deep excavation behind the toothrow of the premaxilla, called the subnarial pit.
supraoccipital
The supraoccipital is an unpaired bone of the occiput at the back of the skull. It forms the top margin of the foramen magnum, and connects dorsally to the parietal bones. It frequently shows a midline ridge for insertion of neck muscles.
supratemporal fenestra
The supratemporal fenestra (also: upper temporal fenestra) is an opening on the rear top of the skull. It is typically bordered by the postorbital, squamosal, and parietal.
surangular
The surangular is a dermal bone in the lower jaw that is visible in side view, being located behind the dentary and above the angular.
syncervical
The syncervical is a structure composed of the fused first three cervical vertebrae in members of Neoceratopsia. While some interpretations have the first four cervicals fused into the syncervical, evolutionary development in Auroraceratops, Leptoceratops and Protoceratops among other ceratopsians show that the syncervical fuses the first three cervicals and the first two intercentra.

== T ==
tarsals
The tarsals are a set of bones in the hind limb between the metatarsals below and the tibia and fibula above. They are collectively called the tarsus. The tarsus consists of an upper series formed by the astragalus and calcaneum, and a lower series of small bones sitting atop the metatarsals. The upper and lower series can move against each other, forming the ankle joint.
teeth
In dinosaurs, teeth are present on the maxilla and premaxilla of the upper jaw and the dentary of the mandible. Only the very basal dinosaurs Eoraptor and Eodromaeus bear rudimentary teeth on the pterygoid of the palate (palatal teeth). A jaw bone without teeth is denoted as edentulous. Teeth can be divided into two parts: the crown, which is the upper, exposed part, and the root, which is nested within the gums. Teeth are primarily composed of two tissue types, enamel and dentin. Enamel forms the hard and shiny outer layer, while the softer and bone-like dentin fills the inside. Occasionally, a third type, cementum, can be found atop the enamel layer.
tibia
The tibia (plural: tibiae) is the larger of the two bones of the lower leg. It is located medial to the fibula. The tibia features a prominent ridge extending from its front surface at its upper end, the cnemial crest (also: tibial crest). The cnemial crest anchored the tendons of the triceps femoris muscles, which were responsible for knee extension (stretching of the leg), and increased the leverage of these muscles.

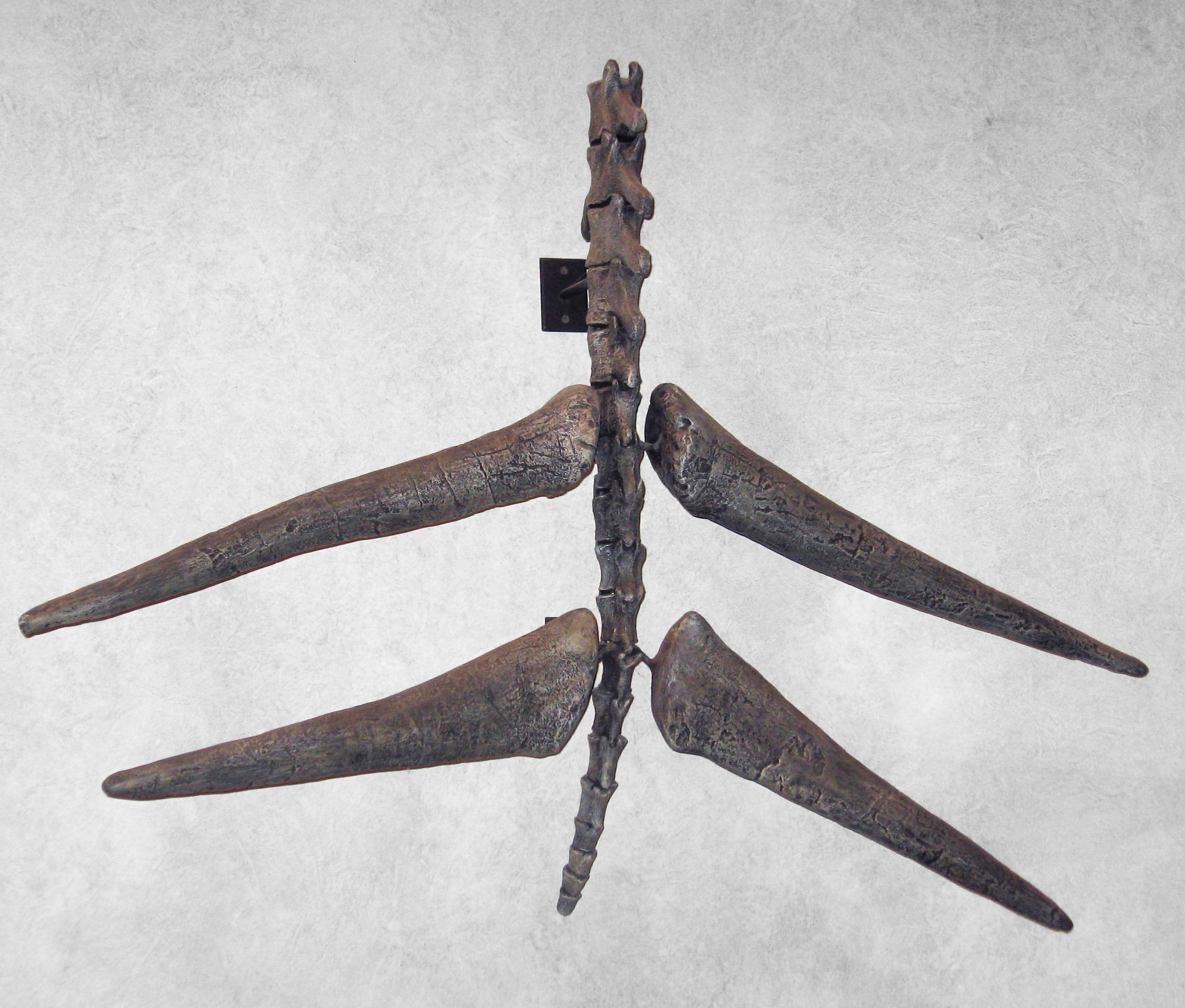
Thagomizer of Stegosaurus

thagomizer
A thagomizer is the four to ten tail spikes seen in stegosaurians. The term was coined in 1982 by cartoonist Gary Larson.
transverse process
Transverse processes are wing-like projections extending sidewards from the neural arches of the cervical, dorsal, sacral, and the frontmost caudal vertebrae. Their typically horizontal orientation results in the characteristic T-shape of the vertebrae in front or back view. At its tip, a transverse processes articulates with the tuberculum of its rib; the broadened articulation area for the rib is termed a diapophysis (plural: diapophyses). Some authors, however, denominate the entire transverse process as the diapophysis, using both terms as synonyms.

== U ==
ulna
The ulna (plural: ulnae) is the larger and more posterior of the two bones of the forearm. The upper end of the ulna often shows a large process extending past the elbow joint, the olecranon process, to which the triceps muscles (forearm extensor muscles) were attached. The sometimes great elongation of the olecranon process provided these muscles with increased leverage.

== V ==
vertebrae
Vertebrae (singular: vertebra) are the bony components of the vertebral column (i.e. the backbone or spine). In dinosaurs, the vertebrae are regionalized into cervicals (neck vertebrae), dorsals (trunk vertebrae), sacrals (hip vertebrae) and caudals (tail vertebrae). Each vertebra has a roughly spool-shaped lower component, the centrum, and an arch-shaped upper component, the neural arch. Between these components is a tube-shaped tunnel, the spinal canal. The spinal cord of the nervous system runs through the spinal canal of each vertebra in the backbone. The cervical, dorsal, and sacral vertebrae connect to ribs via transverse processes on the sides of their neural arch. The caudal vertebrae connect to chevrons on the underside of their centra.
vomer
The vomer is an unpaired, narrow bone of the front part of the palate that separates the left and right maxillae and choanae.

== Z ==
Zahnreihe
A Zahnreihe (German for 'tooth row', plural Zahnreihen) is a series of tooth positions that form a replacement unit. A tooth row typically consists of several Zahnreihen containing two or more teeth each. Tooth replacement always starts at the rearmost tooth position of a Zahnreihe and propagates frontward. This way, it is avoided that two neighboring tooth positions are replaced at the same time, which would leave gaps in the tooth row. The number of teeth from one Zahnreihe to the next is the Z-spacing. When the Z-spacing is exactly 2, teeth are replaced in an alternating pattern; if Z-spacing is greater than 2, teeth will be replaced in sequence.
ziphodont
Ziphodont refers to teeth that are blade-like, with recurved and flattened crowns that typically bear serrations. Adapted to a carnivorous diet, ziphodont teeth are primitively present in dinosaurs, and are found in most non-avian theropods.
zygapophyses
The zygapophyses (singular: zygapophysis), or articular processes, are projections of the vertebral arch that connect adjacent vertebrae. Each vertebra has two pairs of zygapophyses, which are articulating with the zygapophyses of the following and preceding vertebra: At the front are the prezygapophyses (also: cranial zygapophyses), which are extending forwards and have their articular surface facing upwards. At the back of a vertebra are the postzygapophyses (also: caudal zygapophyses), which are extending backwards with their articular surface facing downwards.

== See also ==
- Bird anatomy
- Bird feet and legs
- Glossary of bird terms
