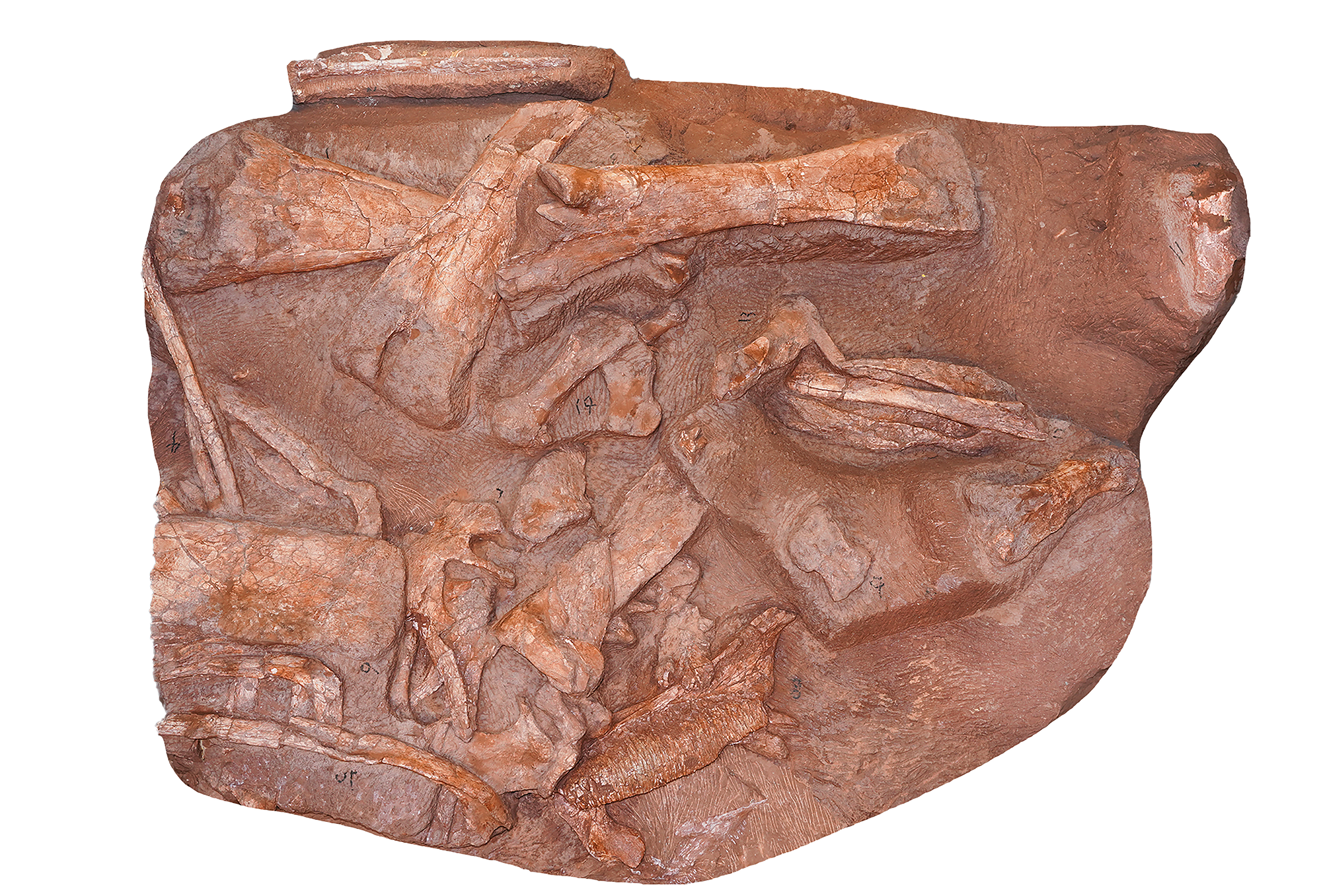
- BGS-JX F001 (block 1), preserving several bones of G. fanwei

Scientific classification
- Kingdom: Animalia
- Phylum: Chordata
- Class: Reptilia
- Clade: Dinosauria
- Clade: †Ornithischia
- Clade: †Ornithopoda
- Family: †Hadrosauridae
- Subfamily: †Saurolophinae
- Tribe: †Brachylophosaurini
- Genus: †Gongshuilong; Yao et al., 2026
- Species: †G. fanwei

Binomial name
- †Gongshuilong fanwei Yao et al., 2026

= Gongshuilong =

Gongshuilong Temporal range: Late Cretaceous, Maastrichtian

Genus of ornithopod dinosaurs

Gongshuilong (lit. 'Gong River dragon') is an extinct genus of saurolophine hadrosaurid dinosaur known from the Late Cretaceous (Maastrichtian age) Lianhe Formation of China. The genus contains a single species, Gongshuilong fanwei, known from a bonebed representing the disarticulated remains of at least two individuals. Gongshuilong is a member of the group Brachylophosaurini within the Hadrosauridae, and it is the second member of this otherwise North American clade, following Wulagasaurus, found in Asia. It is also the first hadrosaurid to be named from fossils found in South China. Gongshuilong is characterized by the uniquely elongated and curved neural spines of the vertebrae at the end of the tail, forming a tall, sail-like structure.

== Discovery and naming ==
In March 2021, construction was underway for the East China International Trade and Industrial Zone in the town of Shahe in Ganzhou city, Jiangxi Province, China. During this construction, a bonebed of hadrosaurid dinosaur fossils was exposed in outcrops representing the Late Cretaceous Lianhe Formation. The following month, a permit was obtained from the province's General Office of the Ministry of Natural Resources, allowing researchers from the Basic Geological Survey Institute of the Jiangxi Geological Survey and Exploration Institute (BGS-JX) and Jiangxi Geological Museum (JXGM) to excavate the fossils in two blocks. They were subsequently transferred to the BGS-JX, where they were prepared for research and are now accessioned under the specimen number BGS-JX F001. At least two individuals are represented in the collected material, as indicated by the discovery of two left dentaries (lower jaw bones), scapulae (part of the pectoral girdle), and tibiae (lower leg bones) of slightly different sizes.

In 2026, Han Yao and colleagues described Gongshuilong fanwei as a new genus and species of brachylophosaurin hadrosaurid based on these fossil remains. They established BGS-JX F001-1, a right dentary, as the holotype specimen, and BGS-JX F001-2, a small region of the skull including the left jugal and quadrate bones, as a paratype. The remaining material from the bonebed was additionally referred to this species, and includes more skull bones (maxilla, nasal, and postorbital), mandibular elements (surangulars), four cervical (neck) vertebrae, a partial posterior (rear) dorsal (trunk) vertebra, ten articulated posterior caudal (tail) vertebrae, forelimb (humeri) and pectoral girdle (scapulae and coracoid) elements, and hindlimb (tibia and femur) bones.

The generic name, Gongshuilong , combines the Mandarin Chinese pinyin terms 'Gongshui', for the Gong River near the type locality, with 'long', meaning 'dragon'. The specific name, fanwei, is another pinyin term alluding the prominent sail-like tail morphology that characterizes this species. While hadrosaurid bones have previously been identified in the Ganzhou region in South China, including a fragmentary skeleton and eggs bearing embryos, Gongshuilong is the first member of this clade found in South China to receive a scientific name.

== Description ==
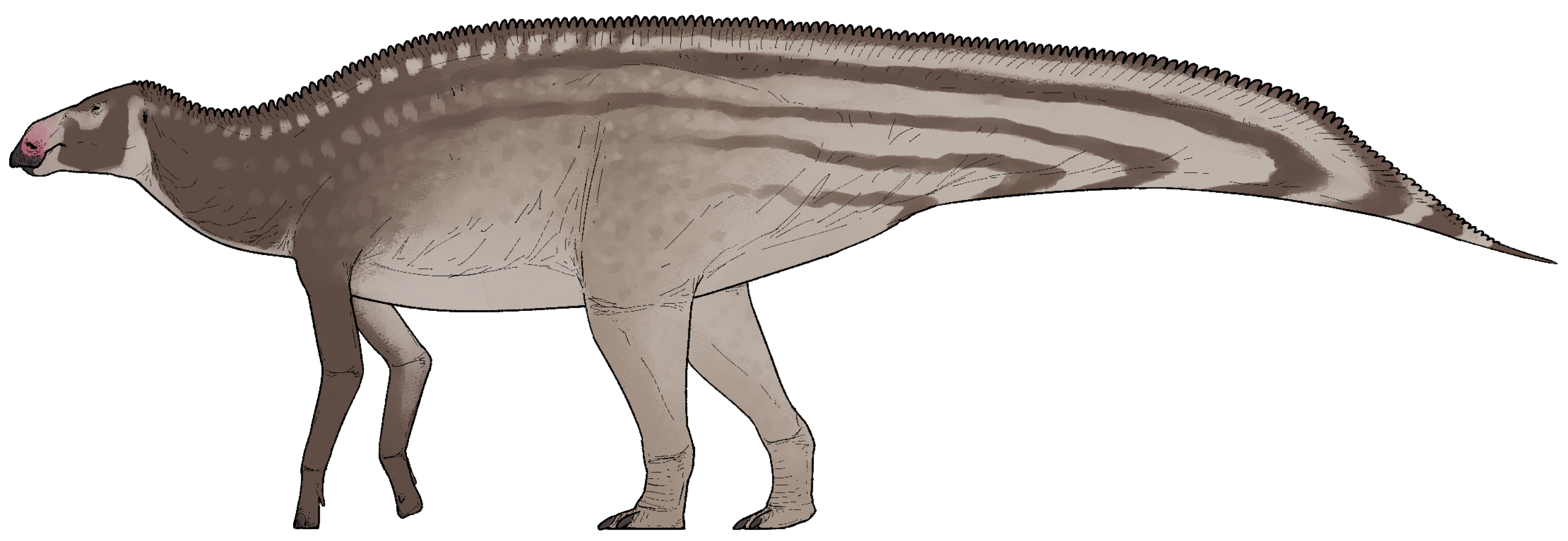
Life restoration

Gongshuilong is recognized as a medium-sized member of the hadrosaurid clade Saurolophinae, with an estimated adult body length of 7 metres (23 ft). The neural spines of the posterior caudal vertebrae are greatly elongate, at 8.5 times as tall as the centrum they are attached to, and somewhat recurved. This gives the end of the tail a tall, sail-like structure. This particular anatomical feature is unique to Gongshuilong, and has not been recognized in other members of the larger clade Iguanodontia.

== Classification ==
To test the affinities and relationships of Gongshuilong, Yao and colleagues included it in an updated version of the phylogenetic matrix of Dai et al. (2025). They recovered Gongshuilong as a member of the tribe Brachylophosaurini within the hadrosaurid clade Saurolophinae. The analysis found an unresolved polytomy within this clade, comprising Gongshuilong, Wulagasaurus, Acristavus, and a clade comprising Maiasaura, Brachylophosaurus, and Probrachylophosaurus. Wulagasaurus is the only other Chinese brachylophosaurin, while the remaining taxa are known from North America. The results of this analysis are displayed in the cladogram below:

- Hadrosauridae
  - Hadrosaurus foulkii
  - Euhadrosauria
    - Lambeosaurinae
      ⊞
      - Aralosaurus tuberiferus
      - - Tsintaosaurini
        - - Jaxartosaurus aralensis
          - - Arenysaurus ardevoli
            - - Lambeosaurini
              - Parasaurolophini
      ⊟
    - Saurolophinae
      - Brachylophosaurini
        - Acristavus gagslarsoni
        - Gongshuilong fanwei
        - Wulagasaurus dongi
        - - Maiasaura peeblesorum
          - - Brachylophosaurus canadensis
            - Probrachylophosaurus bergei
      - - Kritosaurini
          ⊞
          - Kritosaurus navajovius
          - - Secernosaurus koerneri
            - - - Gryposaurus notabilis
                - Gryposaurus monumentensis
              - - Gryposaurus latidens
                - Rhinorex condrupus
          ⊟
        - - Edmontosaurini
            ⊞
            - Kerberosaurus manakini
            - - Shantungosaurus giganteus
              - - Edmontosaurus annectens
                - Edmontosaurus regalis
            ⊟
          - Saurolophini
            ⊞
            - Lophorhothon atopus
            - - Prosaurolophus maximus
              - - Saurolophus angustirostris
                - Saurolophus osborni
            ⊟
