= Qingyuan, Ji'an =

Qingyuan 青原区
- District
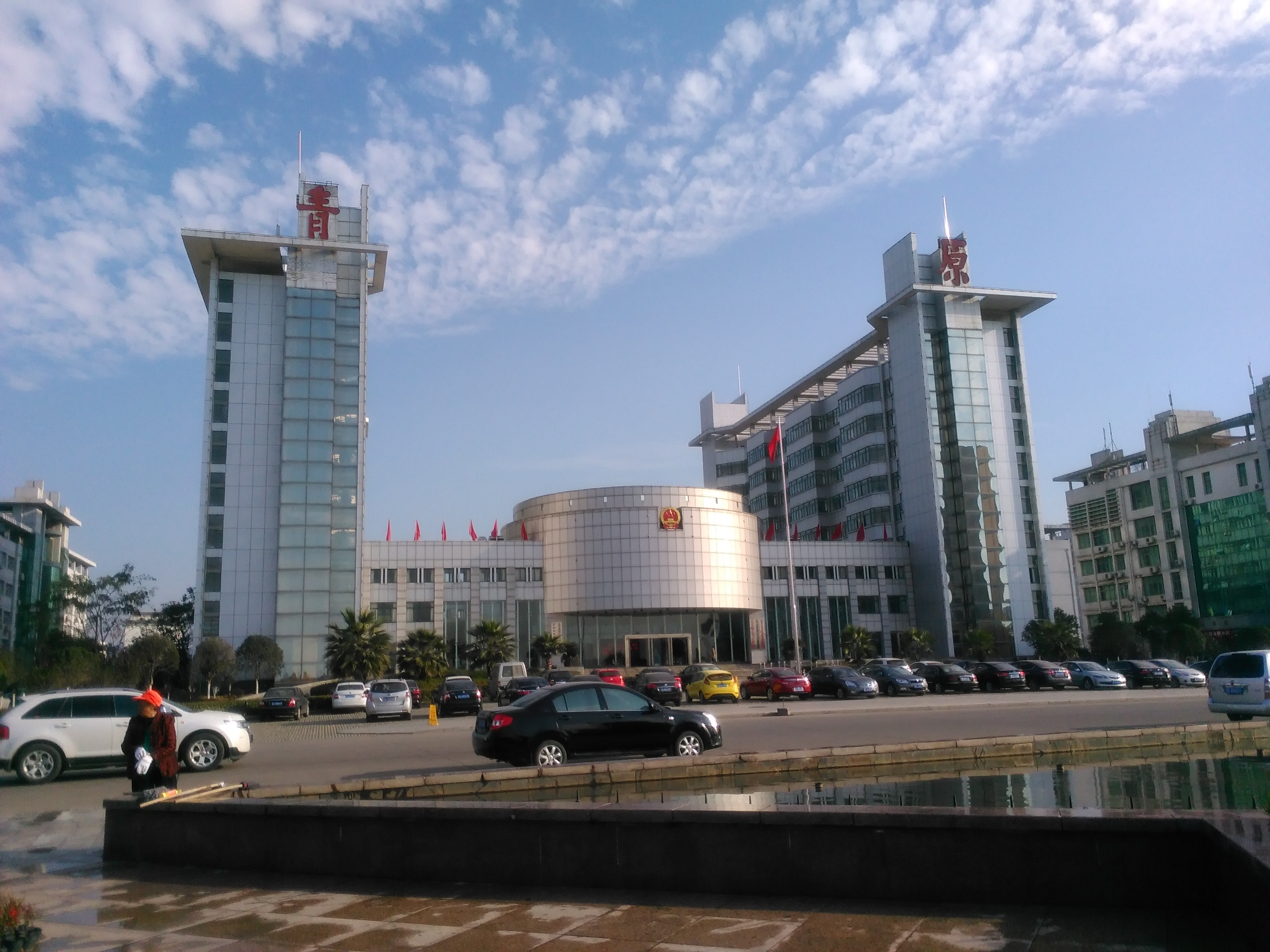
- Qingyuan District Hall

- Location of Qingyuan District (red) within Ji'an City (deeper yellow) and Jiangxi
- Coordinates: 27°04′55″N 115°00′53″E
- Country: People's Republic of China
- Province: Jiangxi
- Prefecture-level city: Ji'an

Area
  - Total: 915 km^{2} (353 sq mi)

Population (2018)
  - Total: 227,500
  - Density: 249/km^{2} (644/sq mi)
- Time zone: UTC+8 (China Standard)
- Postal Code: 343009

Qingyuan is a district (Chinese: 青原区; pinyin: Qīngyuán Qū) in the municipal region of Ji'an, Jiangxi province, People's Republic of China. Qingyuan comprises the right (east) bank of the Gan River opposite the Ji'an municipal government centre, and stretches southeast in a rather narrow strip of territory up to Mount Dawu (大乌山, 1204m) on the border with Ganzhou Municipality.

== Administration ==
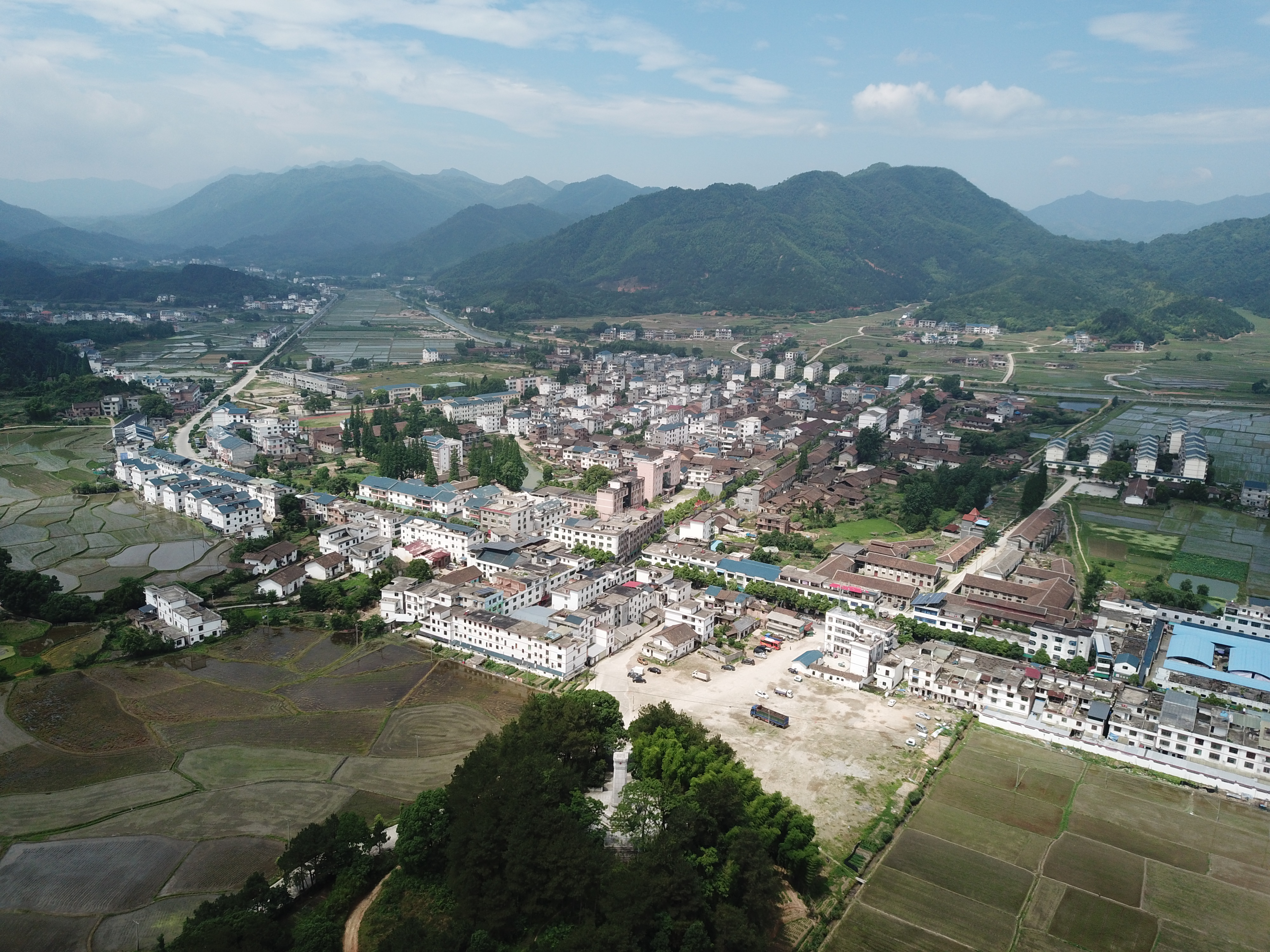
Donggu Township, Qingyuan

The district executive, legislature and judiciary are right on the riverfront in Hedong Subdistrict, Ji'an, along with the CPC and Public Security branches.

=== 2 subdistricts (街道, ่jie dao) ===
- Hedong (河东)
- Binjiang (滨江)

=== 5 Towns (镇, zhen) ===
- Tianyu (天玉)
- Futan (富滩)
- Zhixia (值夏)
- Xinxu (新圩)
- Futian (富田) - site of the 1930 Futian Incident, is upgraded from township
- Wenpi (文陂) is upgraded from township

=== 1 Ethnic Township (民族乡, minzu xiang) ===
- She Donggu (东固畲族民族乡)

== Economy ==
The supermarket chains Ganyuting and Guoguang have their headquarters in the district.

== Education ==
Jinggangshan University is located in this district.

Secondary schools:

- Jinggangshan University Affiliated High School
