= Guoguang (Jiangxi) =

Supermarket chain in Ji'an, China

Jiangxi Guoguang Commercial Chain
- Simplified Chinese: 江西国光商业连锁有限责任公司
- Traditional Chinese: 江西國光商业连锁有限责任公司
Transcriptions
Standard Mandarin
- Hanyu Pinyin: Jiāngxī Guóguāng Shāngyè LiánsuǒYǒuxiàn Zérèn Gōngsī

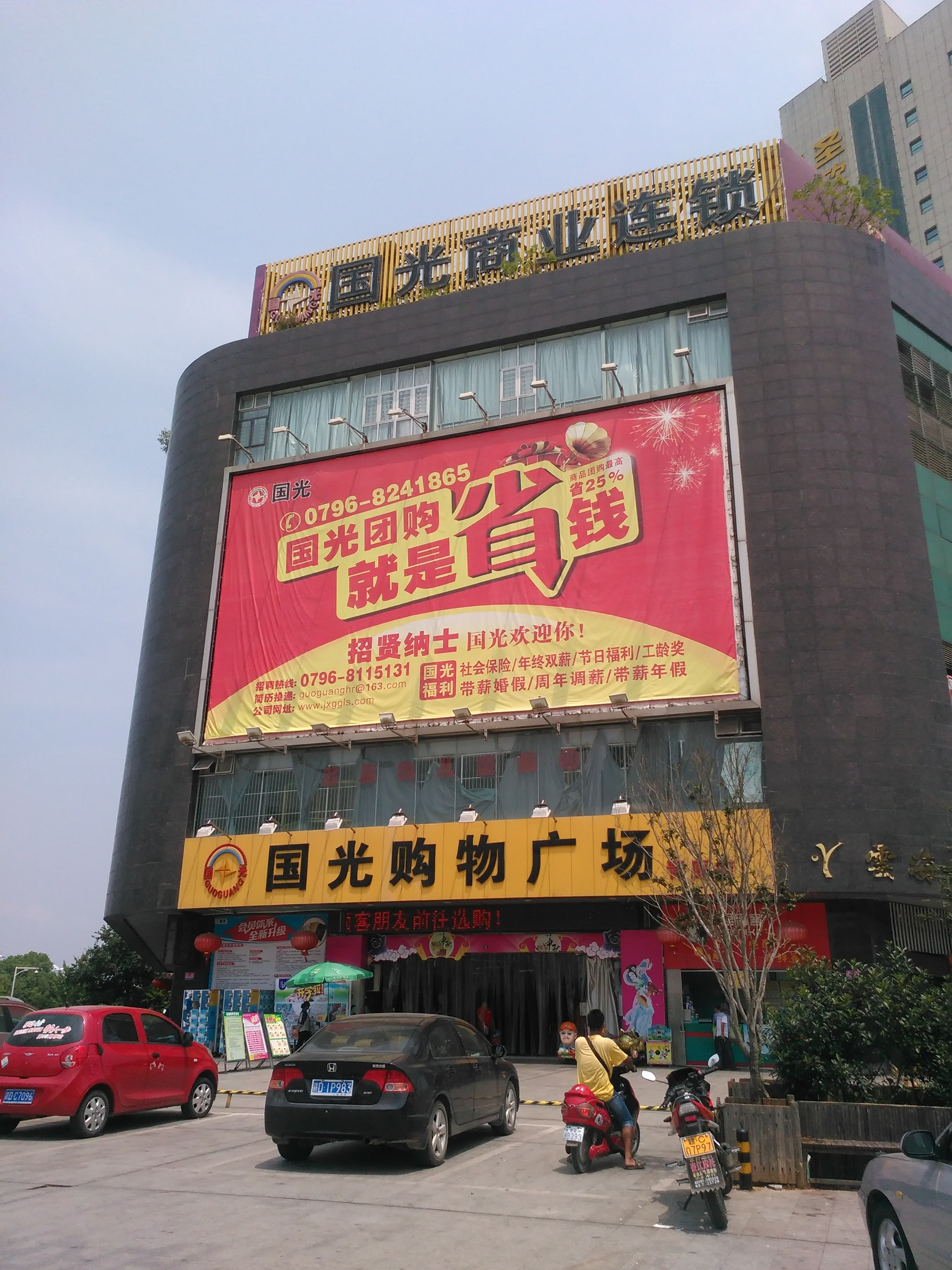
Guoguang Qingyuan store and corporate headquarters

Guoguang or Kuokuang (simplified Chinese: 国光; traditional Chinese: 國光; pinyin: Guóguāng) is a supermarket chain in Ji'an, Jiangxi, China. Its headquarters are in Qingyuan District.

In 2013 there was a rumor that the chain was for sale. As of that year there were new entrants in Ji'an's supermarket market, which had the possibility of affecting both Guoguang and Ganyuting, which were the two established companies in the region.
