= Jinggangshan University =

University in Ji'an, China

Coordinates: 27°6.801′N 115°1.287′E

- 井冈山大学
- Motto: 精神的教育
- Motto in English: Educate the spirit
- Type: Public
- Established: 1958
- President: Zhang Taicheng 张泰城 (Zhāng Tàichéng)
- Faculty: 1,600
- Students: 27,000
- Location: Ji'an, Jiangxi, China
- Campus: Urban, 421 acres
- Website: www.jgsu.edu.cn (in Chinese) english.jgsu.edu.cn (in English)

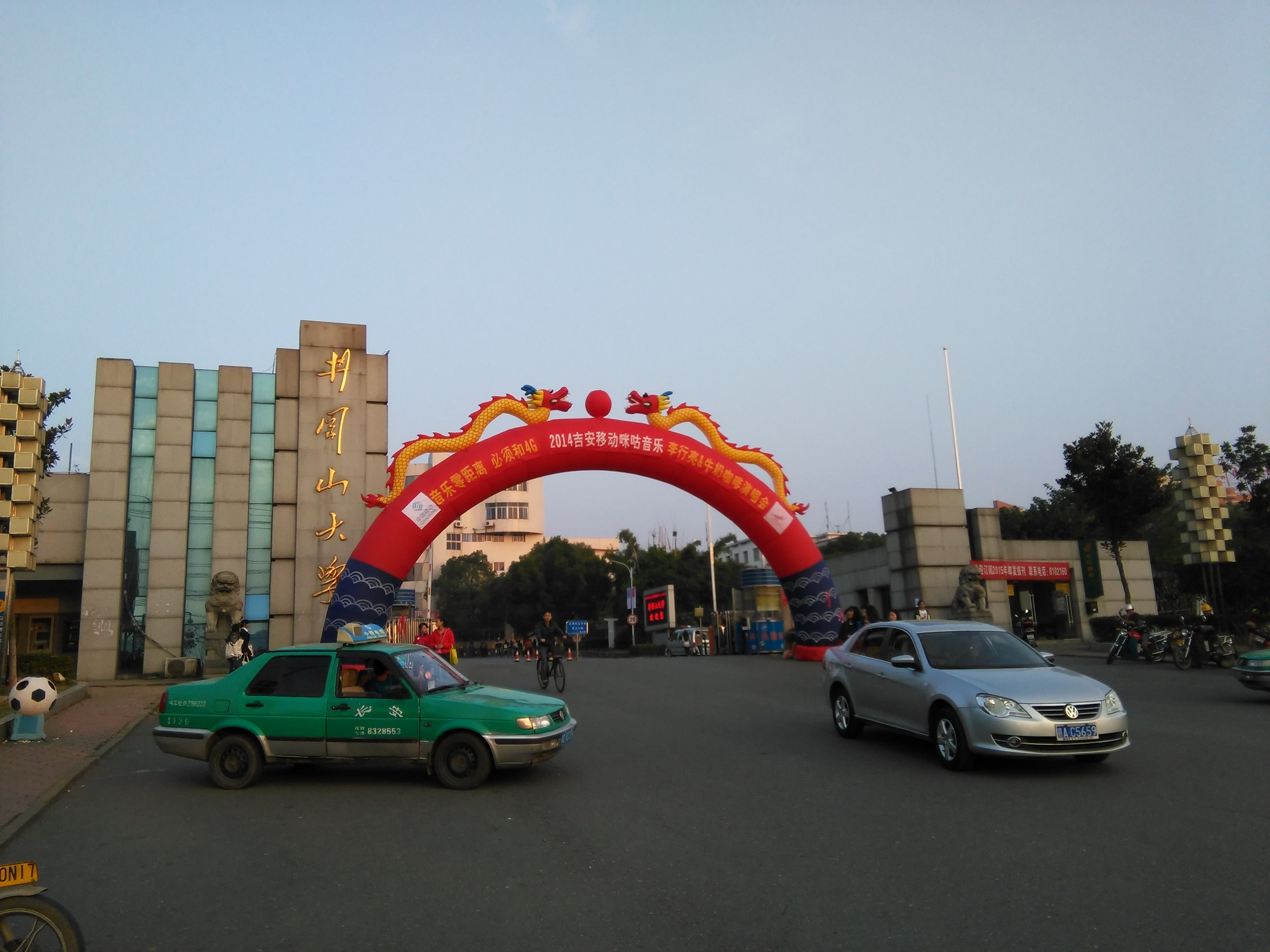
School gate

Jinggangshan University (JGSU, simplified Chinese: 井冈山大学; traditional Chinese: 井岡山大學; pinyin: Jǐnggāngshān Dàxué) is in the Jinggangshan Mountains in Qingyuan District, Ji'an city of Jiangxi province in China. JGSU is jointly supported by the Ministry of Education of the People's Republic of China and the People's Government of Jiangxi Province, pair-assisted by Tongji University and authorized by Nanjing Military Region for cultivation of military talents and cadres.

JGSU comprises 21 schools offering 75 undergraduate majors with modern language laboratories and computer centers covering around 170 hectares. Out of nearly 1,600 academic staff, 129 are professors and 409 associate professors, of which 154 possess a doctoral degree, and 611 a master's degree.

Jinggangshan University was ranked at 1038 according to the 2015 world university ranking.

The Journal of Jinggangshan University is a monthly periodical published by JGSU which covers the fields of philosophy and social sciences and nature sciences, each with their own editions.

== History ==
Jinggangshan University was established in 1958 in Ji'an. Chinese Communist Party Chairman Mao Zedong and his colleagues established the first rural base of the revolution in the Jinggangshan Mountains in 1927. In 1963, JGSU was closed for five years due to poor economic conditions in China.

In 1978, to reinstate JGSU, the Branch of Jiangxi Normal University and the Jiangxi Medical University in Jinggangshan were joined together. In April 1982 and March 1993, they were renamed as 'Jinggangshan Teacher's College' and 'Jinggangshan Medical School", respectively. In March 2000, after approval by the Ministry of Education of the People's Republic of China (MOE), Jinggangshan Teacher's College was renamed to Jinggangshan University after merging with Ji'an Educational Institute. In July 2003, approved once again by the MOE, Jinggangshan Normal University was renamed to Jinggangshan University by joining Jinggangshan Medicine College and Jinggangshan Vocational Technical College.

== Medical School ==
Graduation batch of international students, 2012

The Medical School of Jinggangshan University (Chinese: 井冈山大学医学院; pinyin: jǐng gāng shān dàxué yīxuéyuàn) possesses a Level 3A graded affiliated hospital, the Jinggangshan University Affiliated Hospital, which consists of 35 medical departments and sections with a capacity of 522 sick beds.

The medical school is listed in WHO, FAIMER, the Geneva Foundation for Medical Education and Research (GFMER), for INDIA, as well as the AVICENNA Directory for medicine.

== Schools ==
- School of Political Science and Law
- School of Marxism
- School of Humanities
- School of Foreign Languages
- School of Business
- School of Mathematical Sciences and Physics
- School of Mechanical Engineering
- School of Architecture
- School of Chemistry and Chemical Engineering
- School of Life Sciences
- School of Electronic and Information Technology
- School of Education
- School of Medicine
- School of Nursing
- School of Arts
- School of Physical Education
- School of National Defense Students
- School of Training

== Affiliated institutions ==
- Jinggangshan University Affiliated High School

== See also ==
- Xinjiang Medical University
- Nanchang University
- Yichun University
- Guilin University of Technology
- Solano Community College
- University of California, Davis
