= Jinggangshan University Affiliated High School =

School in Ji'an, Jiangxi, China

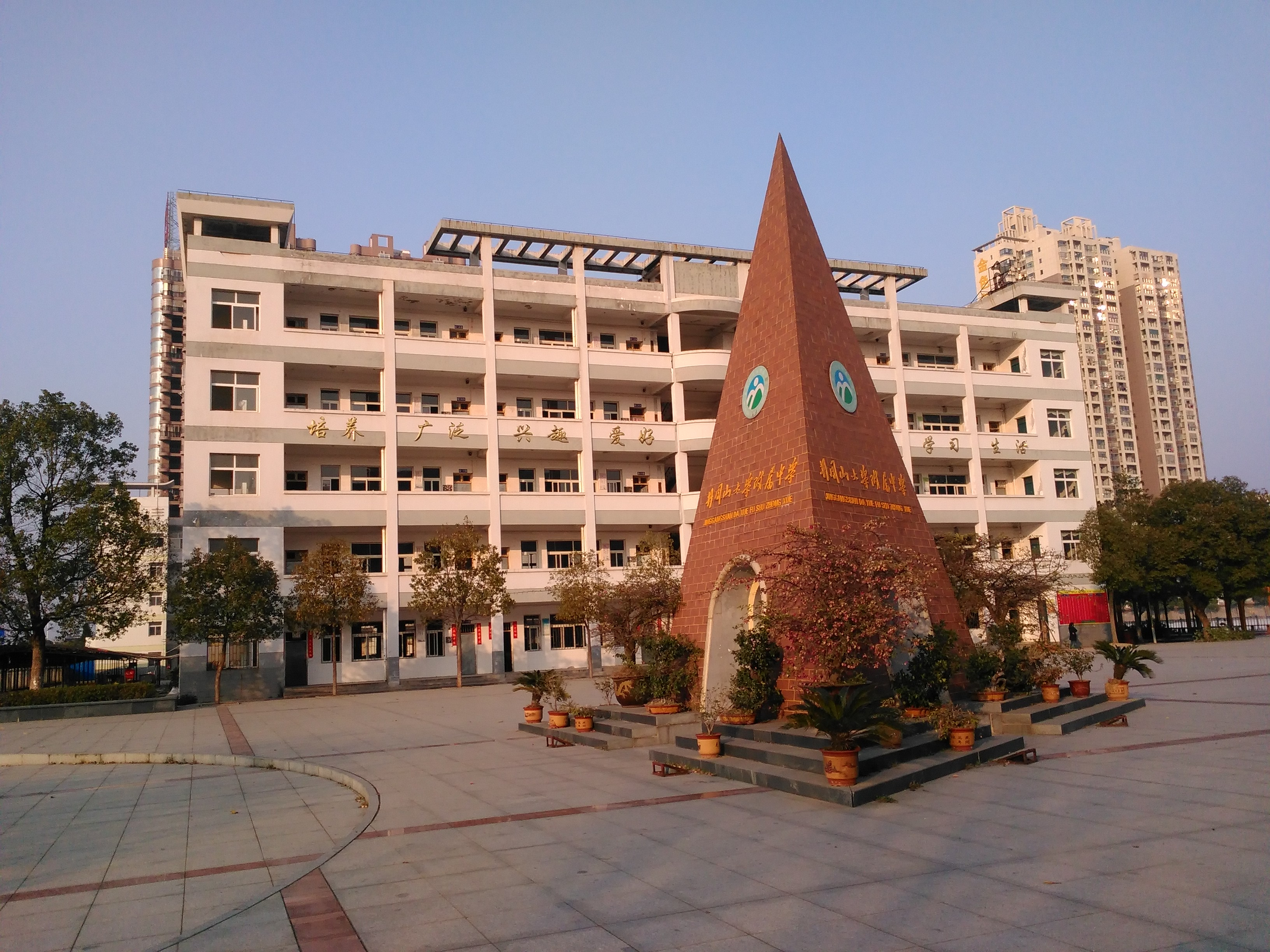
Jinggangshan University Affiliated High School

Jinggangshan University Affiliated High School (simplified Chinese: 井冈山大学附属中学; traditional Chinese: 井岡山大學附屬中學; pinyin: Jǐnggāngshān Dàxué Fùshǔ Zhōngxué) is a Chinese secondary school in Qingyuan District, Ji'an, Jiangxi. It is affiliated with Jinggangshan University.
