= Ganyuting =

Supermarket chain in Ji'an, Jiangxi, China

Ganyuting Trading Company
- Simplified Chinese: 甘雨亭商贸有限責任公司
- Traditional Chinese: 甘雨亭商貿有限责任公司
Transcriptions
Standard Mandarin
- Hanyu Pinyin: Gānyǔtíng Shāngmào Yǒuxiàn Zérèn Gōngsī

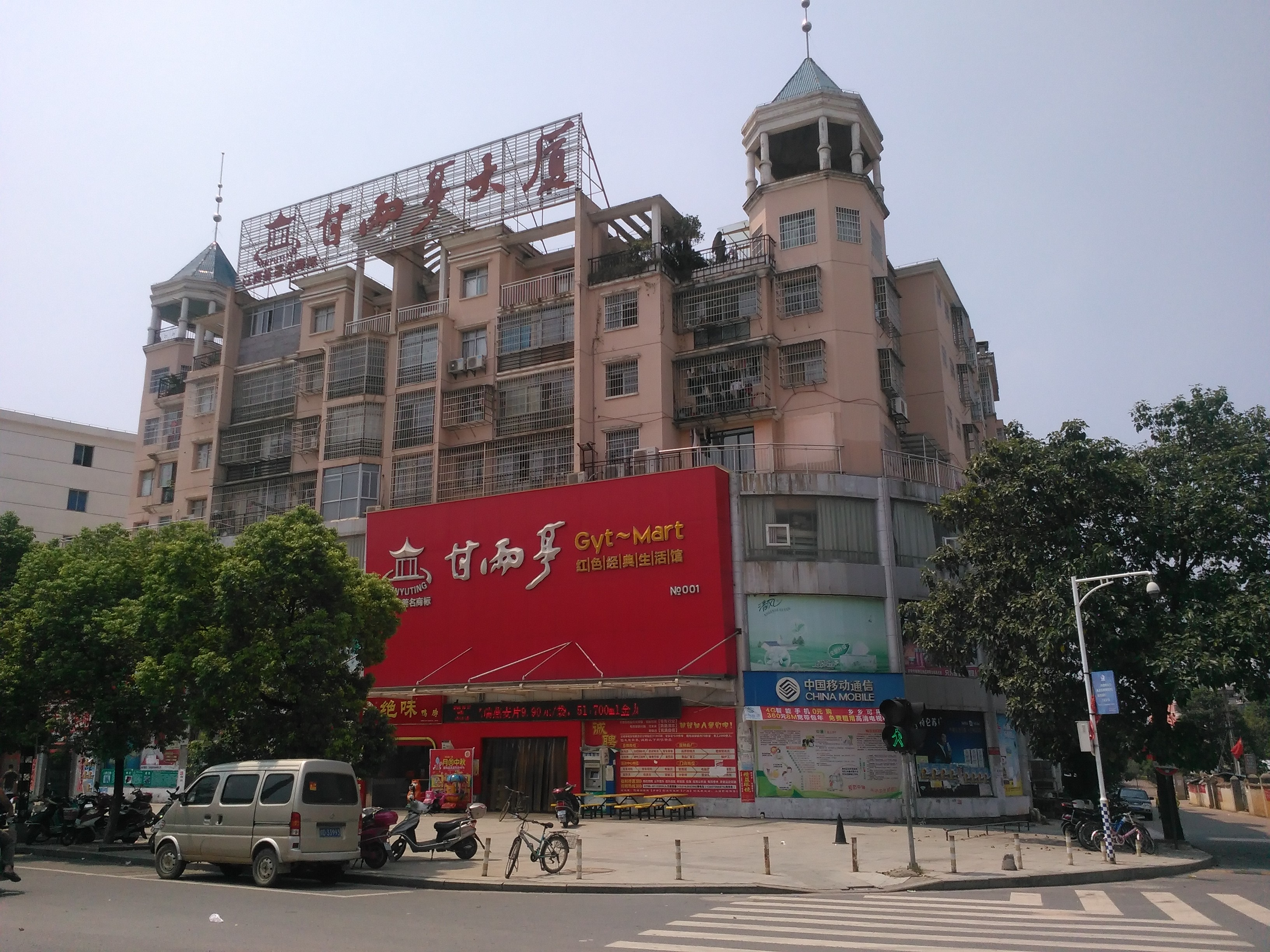
Ganyuting Store #1 and corporate headquarters

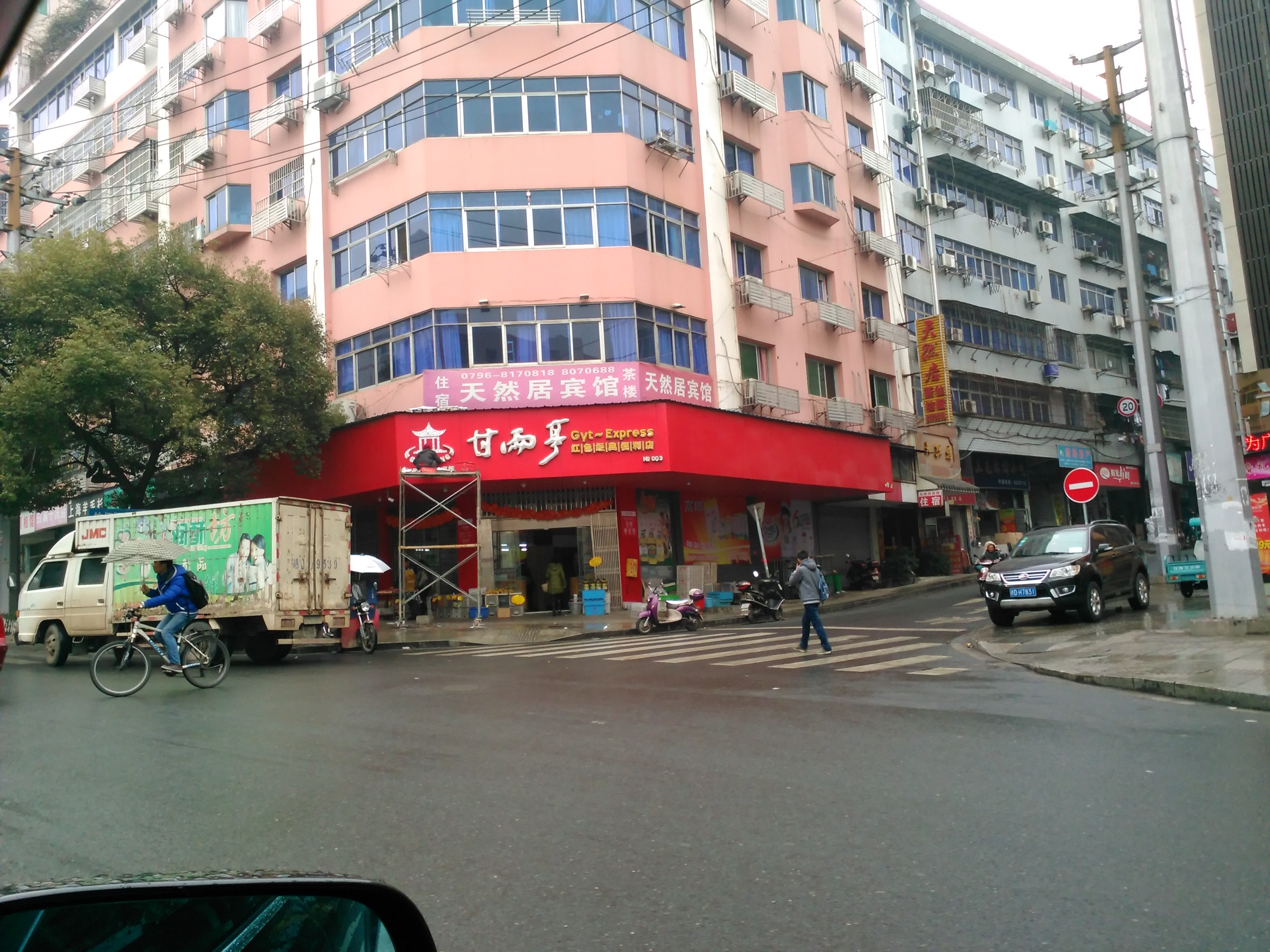
Ganyuting #3

Ganyuting (Chinese: 甘雨亭商城; pinyin: Gānyǔtíng Shāngchéng) is a supermarket and department store chain in Ji'an, Jiangxi, China. The headquarters are in Qingyuan District, and as of 2013 the company has about 2,000 employees and 67 locations throughout Ji'an.

As of that 2013 there were new entrants in Ji'an's supermarket market, which had the possibility of affecting both Ganyuting and Guoguang, which were the two established companies in the region.
