= Hedong Subdistrict, Ji'an =

Hedong Subdistrict 河东街道
- Subdistrict
- Location in Jiangxi Hedong Subdistrict (China)
- Coordinates: 27°5′56″N 115°2′11″E
- Country: People's Republic of China
- Province: Jiangxi
- Prefecture-level city: Ji'an
- District: Qingyuan District
- Time zone: UTC+8 (China Standard)

Hedong Subdistrict (simplified Chinese: 河东街道; traditional Chinese: 河東街道; pinyin: Hédōng Jiēdào) is a subdistrict in Qingyuan District, Ji'an, Jiangxi province, China. As of 2018, it has 8 residential communities and 11 villages under its administration.

== See also ==
- List of township-level divisions of Jiangxi
