= Gan River =

River in Jiangxi, China

Coordinates: 28.532°N 115.815°E

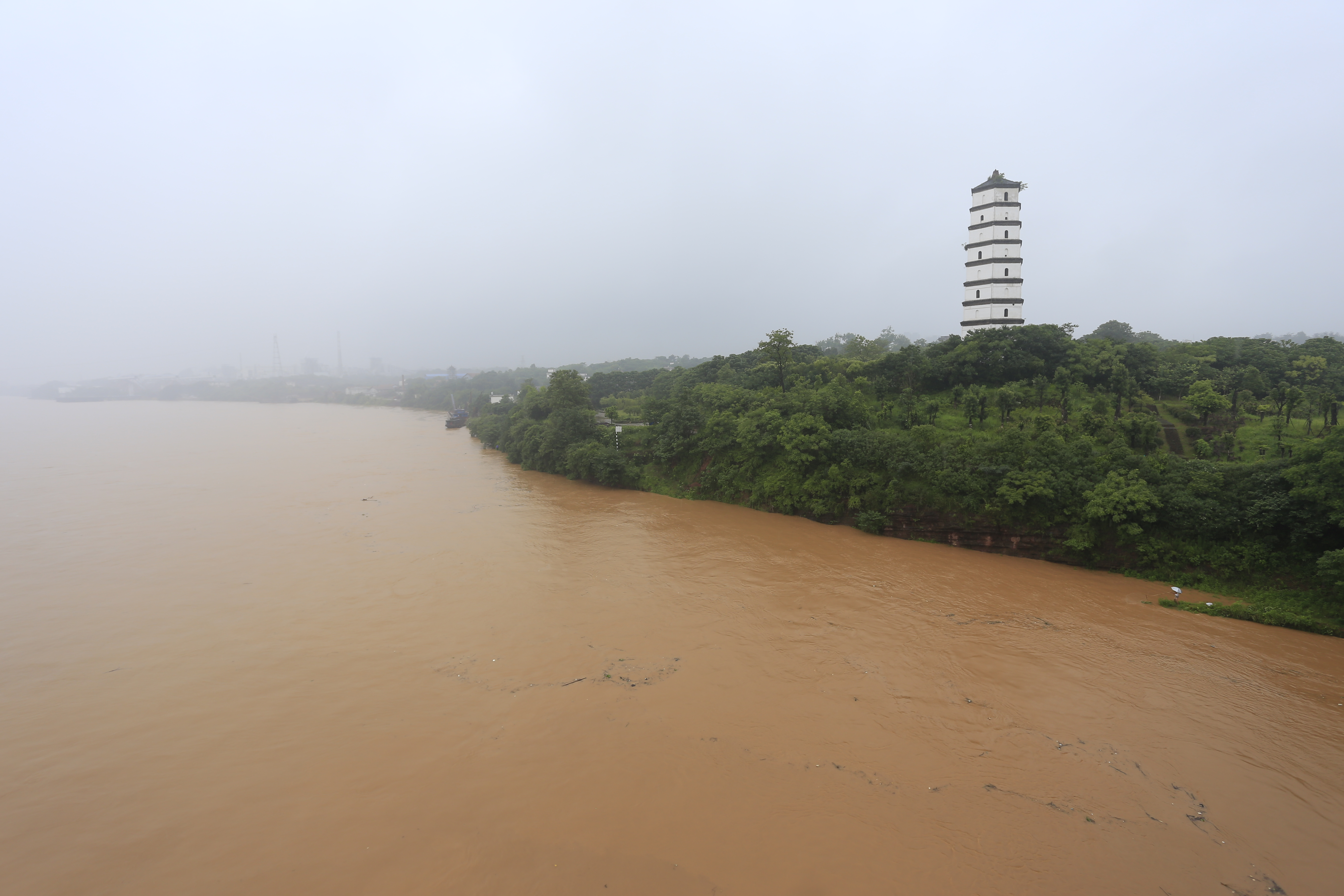
- Gan River and Yuhong Pagoda in Ganzhou

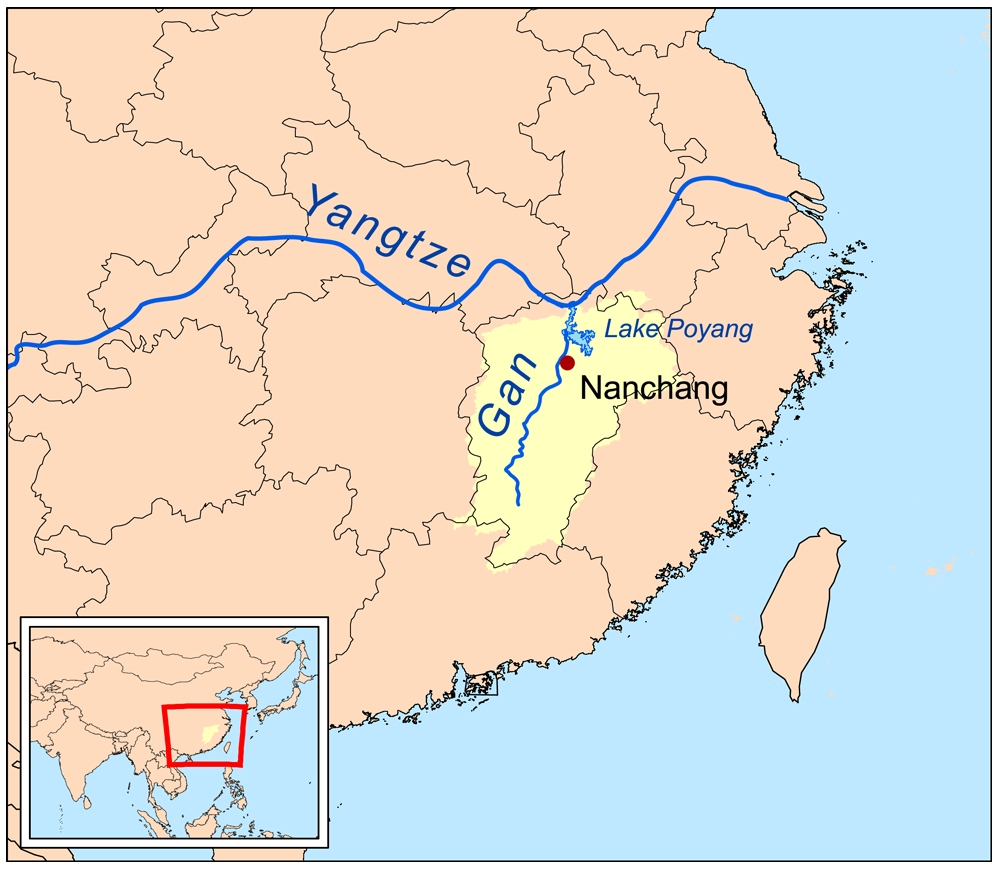
- Native name: 赣江 (Chinese)

Location
- Country: People's Republic of China
- Province: Jiangxi

Physical characteristics
- Mouth
  - location: Lake Poyang
- Length: 599 km (372 mi)
- Basin size: 103,074 km^{2} (39,797 sq mi)
- Discharge
  - average: 2,865 m^{3}/s (101,200 cu ft/s)

Basin features
- Tributaries
  - left: Gong River, Zhang River
  - right: Mei River

The Gan River (Chinese: 赣江; pinyin: Gàn Jiāng, Gan: Kōm-kong) runs north through the western part of Jiangxi before flowing into Lake Poyang and thus the Yangtze River. The Xiang-Gan uplands separate it from the Xiang River of neighboring eastern Hunan.

Two similarly sized rivers, the Gong River which is the southern tributary and the Mei River from the north combine in Yudu County, Jiangxi, to form the Gan. The Gan River flows 527 km (327 mi) before splitting into distributaries just north of Nanchang. The longest of these, the North Branch, is several times longer than the other distributaries at 72 km (45 mi). The Gan River is the major geographical feature of Jiangxi, and gives its name to the Gan variety of Chinese as well as the province's one-character abbreviation. The river feeds into Lake Poyang, which in turns connects with the Yangtze.

== See also ==
- List of rivers in China
- 2010 South China floods
