= Gong River =

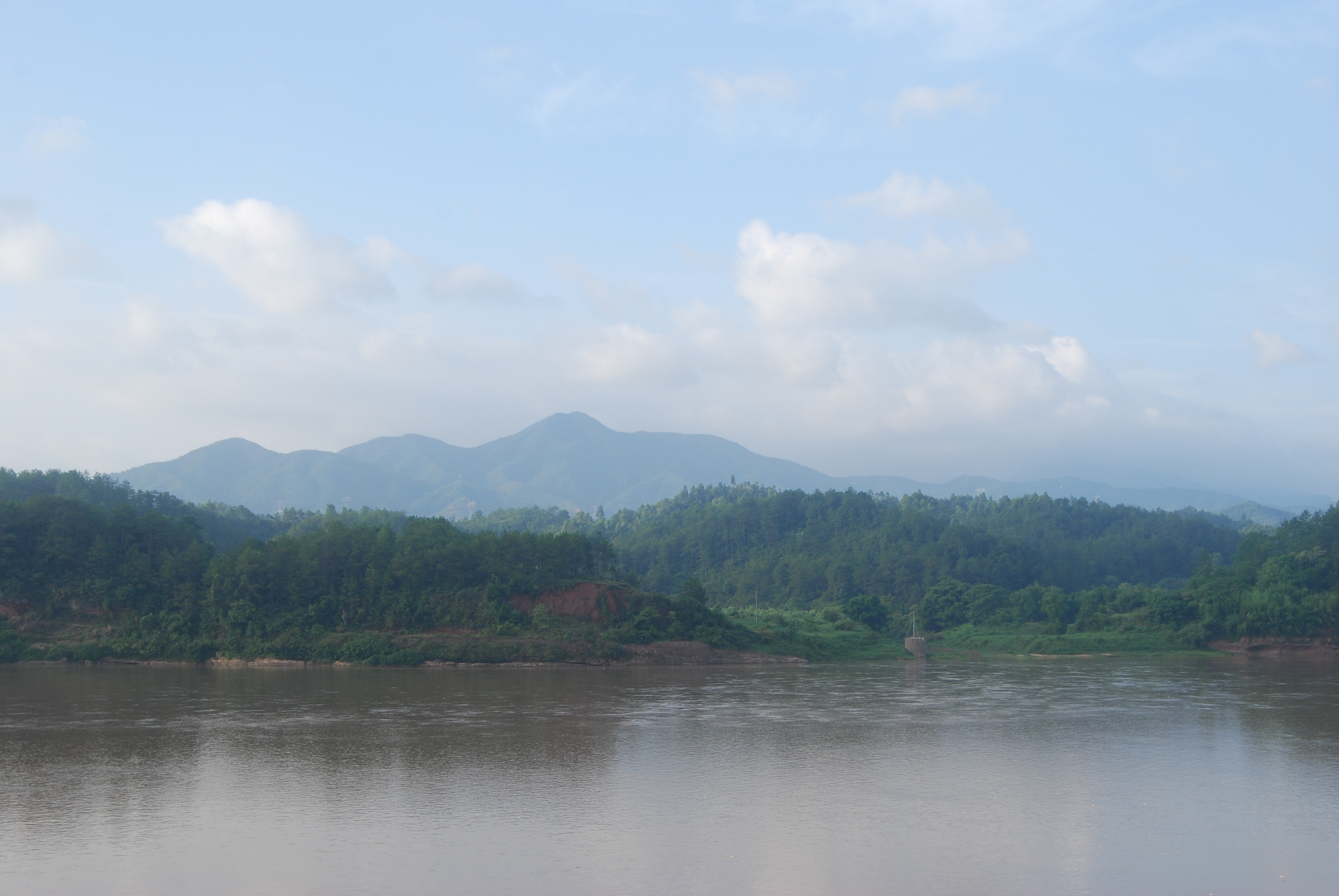
- Gong River in Ganxian District

- Native name: 贡水 (Chinese)

Location
- Country: People's Republic of China
- Province: Jiangxi

Physical characteristics
- Mouth
  - location: Gan River
  - coordinates: 27°18′30″N 115°30′53″E
- Length: 313 km (194 mi)
- Basin size: 27074 km2

Basin features
- River system: Yangtze River
- Tributaries
  - left: Tao river
  - right: Ping river

Gong River or Gongshui (Chinese: 贡水) is a river of China. It is part of the East China Sea basin as a headwater of the Gan River, which itself is a tributary of the Yangtze.

The Gong river flows in Jiangxi province and is the main tributary of the Gan river, itself a tributary of the Yangtze. The river watershed has an area of 27,074 square kilometers (10,453 sq mi) (30% of the Gan river basin). The average flow of the river is 700 cubic meters per second (25,000 cu ft/s). Its main tributaries are the Tao and Ping rivers.

The river basin of the river extends between longitudes 114° 48′–116° 08′ and latitudes 24° 38′–26° 43 ′ N.

== Climate ==
The climate is of the humid subtropical climate type with rainfall concentrated in the summer (between April and September). Average annual precipitation is 1627 mm with an evaporation of 1550 mm and an average annual temperature of 18 °C. The watershed is mainly occupied by hills and small mountains. This is one of the regions of southern China most affected by erosion phenomena associated with human activities (destruction of forests, cultivation of soils and opening of mines and quarries).

== See also ==
- List of rivers in China
