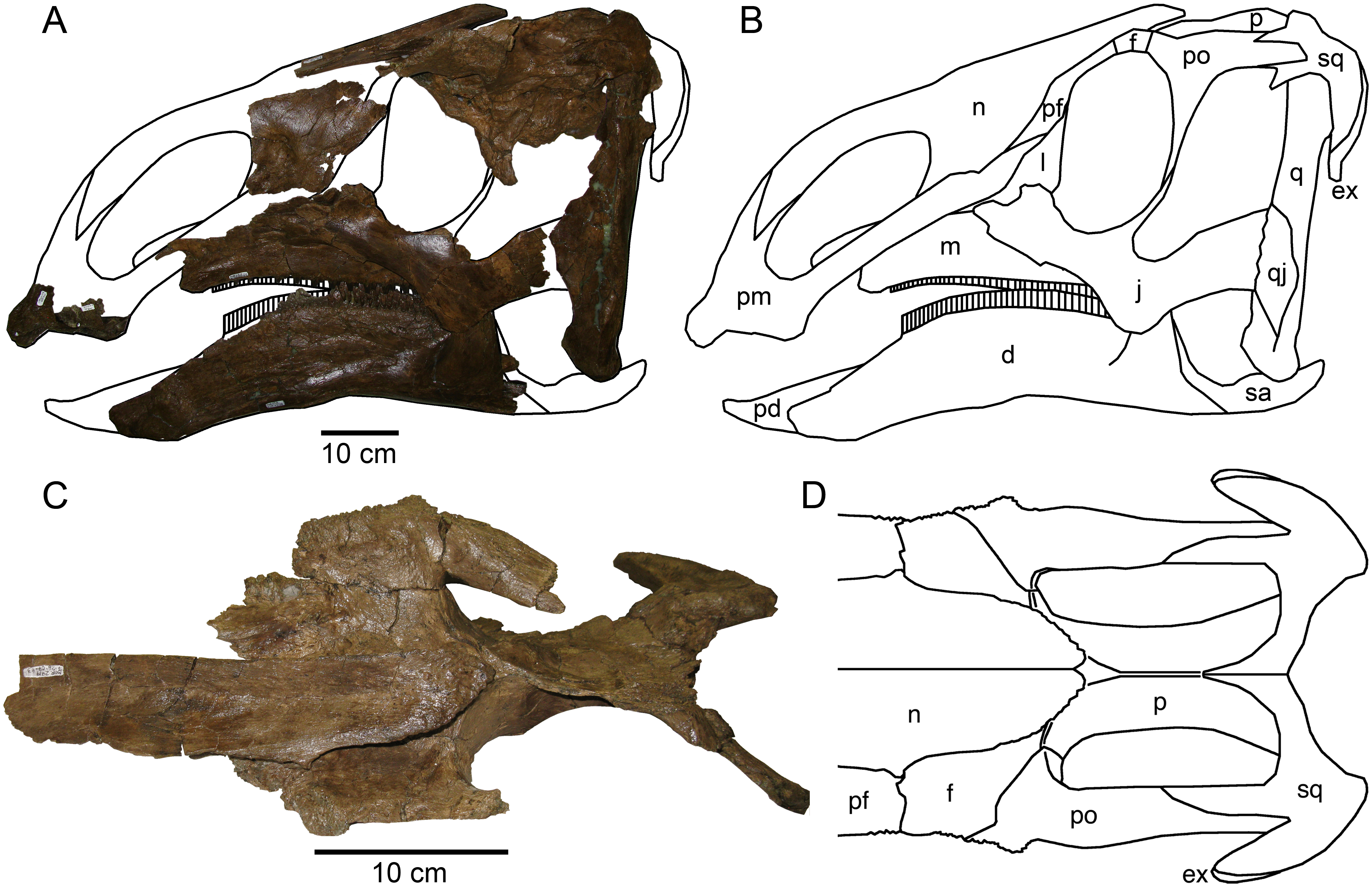
- Diagram of known skull material

Scientific classification
- Kingdom: Animalia
- Phylum: Chordata
- Class: Reptilia
- Clade: Dinosauria
- Clade: †Ornithischia
- Clade: †Ornithopoda
- Family: †Hadrosauridae
- Subfamily: †Saurolophinae
- Tribe: †Brachylophosaurini
- Genus: †Probrachylophosaurus; Freedman Fowler & Horner, 2015

Type species
- †Probrachylophosaurus bergei Freedman Fowler & Horner, 2015

Synonyms
- †Brachylophosaurus goodwini? Horner, 1988

= Probrachylophosaurus =

Probrachylophosaurus Temporal range: Late Cretaceous, 80.45–79 Ma

Extinct genus of duckbilled dinosaurs

Probrachylophosaurus is a genus of hadrosaurid dinosaur that lived during the Late Cretaceous in North America. Fossils have been found in rocks of the Judith River Formation in Montana and the Foremost Formation in Alberta, and date to the Campanian age, c. 80.45–79 million years ago. The only recognized species is Probrachylophosaurus bergei. First discovered in Montana in 1981 and not fully excavated until 2008, it was initially suspected to be a new species of Brachylophosaurus. However, in 2015 it was named as a distinct genus, with its name reflecting a suspected ancestral relationship. Both an adult and subadult specimen were originally recognized, and in 2021 fragmentary remains would extend its known range into the Foremost Formation. Thought to be a close relative of the later Brachylophosaurus and Ornatops, and a possible descendant of the older Acristavus, it represents a possible transitional state in brachylophosaurin evolution. Nonetheless, whether this represents a single evolutionary lineage or a series of diverging or convergent branches remains unclear, as does its relation to the genus Maiasaura.

As a hadrosaur, Probrachylophosaurus would have been a large herbivore, 10 metres (33 ft) in length, that walked primarily on four legs and possessed a large beak. Like many other hadrosaurs, it was distinguished by its head crest, likely used for display. In Probrachylophosaurus this crest is a short, paddle-shaped extension of the nasal bone projecting over the back of the head. It is tallest in the middle and triangular when seen from behind. This distinguishes it from Brachylophosaurus, which had a longer crest with a flat shape formed by the nasals and the frontal bones. In both genera, the frontals bear long striation marks termed the "nasofrontal sturue", expanded for the sake of supporting the large crest. In Probrachylophosaurus these cover only half of the frontal surface, unlike the later Ornatops and Brachylophosaurus where they expand further and in the latter cover the entire frontal. Aside from the crest, its skull shows an intermediate anatomy between the robust Acristavus and the more lightly built Brachylophosaurus. The most complete specimen possesses several injuries, including a series of fractured tail vertebrae that may have been damaged by interactions with other hadrosaurs.

During the Campanian when Probrachylophosaurus lived, Alberta and Montana were part of a wet coastal plain along the Western Interior Seaway, fed by sediments expelled by the growing Rocky Mountains to the west. Being amongst the first group of hadrosaurs to colonize the area upon its exposure by the sea receding, it would have initially lived in the coastal lagoons and estuaries of the Foremost Formation before its ecosystem later changed to be a more terrestrial floodplain with abundant rivers as seen in the Judith River Formation. It would have lived with a variety of other dinosaurs, including a diverse array of centrosaurine ceratopsids and large predatory tyrannosaurids that would have preyed upon it. After the time of Probrachylophosaurus, the area in which it lived would again be covered by the seaway. Histologic analysis indicates fast growth, similar to other hadrosaurs. However, comparisons with the related Maiasaura indicate that Probrachylophosaurus took around twice as long to reach sexual maturity. The oldest known specimen had likely reached over 95% of its adult size upon death at 14 years of age, but did not yet show signs of complete skeletal maturity.

== Discovery and naming ==
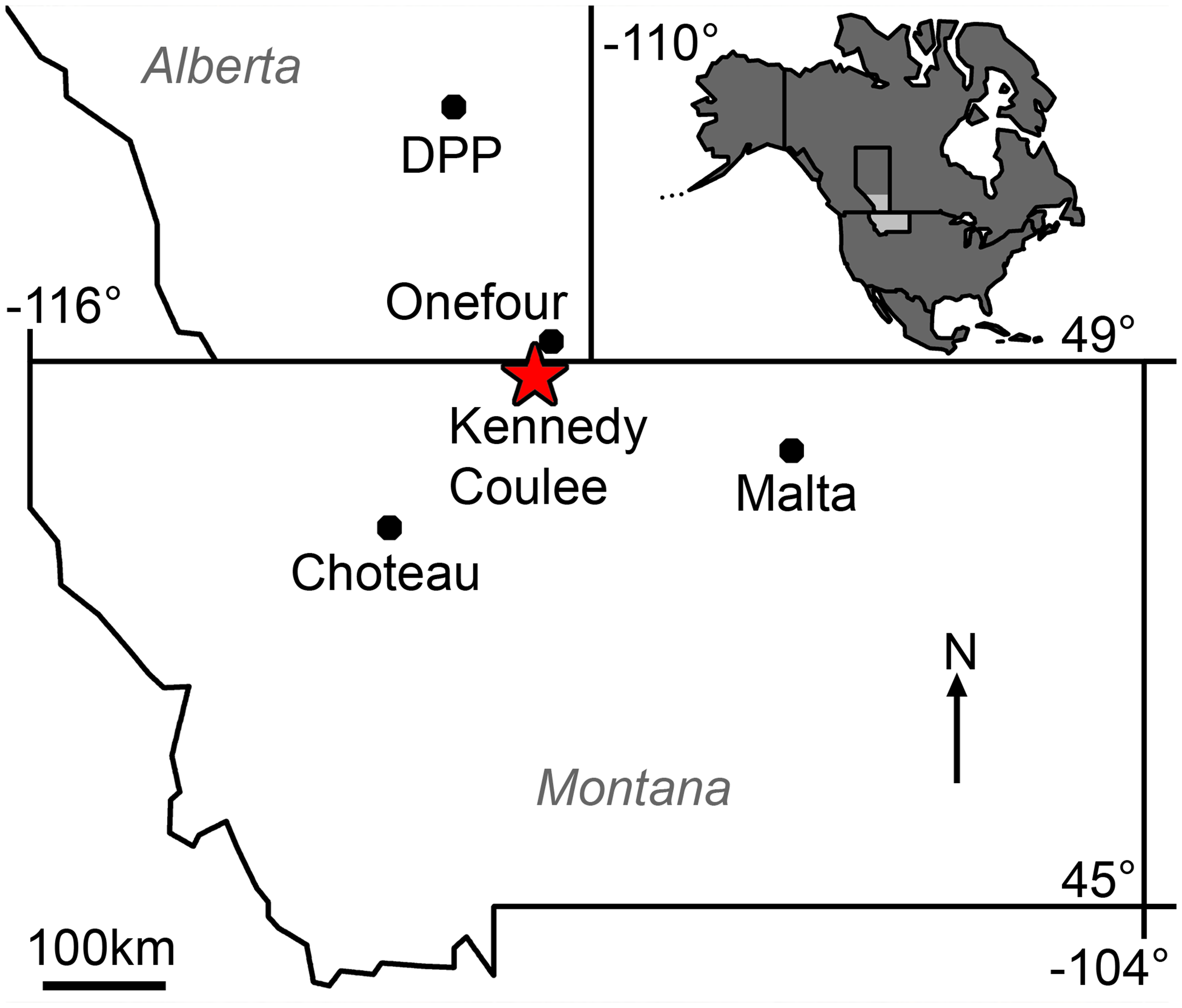
Map of Brachylophosaurini (Saurolophinae) specimen discoveries in Alberta and Montana. Remains of Probrachylophosaurus have been found at the site that is marked with the red star.

In 1981 and 1994, Mark Goodwin of the University of California Museum of Paleontology excavated limb bones and a vertebra near Rudyard in the north of Montana, at a site originally discovered by Kyoko Kishi. After a school class found some more bones, in 2007 and 2008 a team of the Museum of the Rockies secured the remainder of a hadrosaur skeleton, among which the skull. The fossil was donated to the Museum of the Rockies by land owners Nolan and Cheryl Fladstol; and John and Claire Wendland. In 2009, 2010 and 2011, the find was reported in the scientific literature as a possible new species of Brachylophosaurus.

In 2015, the type species Probrachylophosaurus bergei was named and described by Elizabeth A. Freedman Fowler and Jack Horner. The generic name is a combination of Latin pro, "before", and Brachylophosaurus and refers to the genus being situated in a lower position in the stratification than its relative Brachylophosaurus. The specific name honours Sam Berge, one of the landowners, and his friends who have supported the research. Probrachylophosaurus was one of eighteen dinosaur taxa from 2015 to be described in open access or free-to-read journals.

=== Known material ===
The holotype, MOR 2919, was found in a layer of the Judith River Formation dating from the Campanian and being between 79.8 and 79.5 million years old, plus or minus two hundred thousand years. It consists of a partial skeleton with skull, of an adult individual. It contains the right premaxilla, both maxillae, the left jugal, a part of the right lacrimal, the rear of a left nasal bone, the middle part of a right nasal bone, the skull roof from the frontal bones to the exoccipitals, both squamosals, both quadrate bones, the predentary of the lower jaws, both dentaries, a right surangular, eleven neck vertebrae, eleven back vertebrae, twenty-nine tail vertebrae, nineteen chevron bones, nineteen ribs, the entire pelvis, both lower legs, a right second metatarsal and a right fourth metatarsal. The bones have not been found in articulation. Specimen MOR 1097, a fragmentary skull of a subadult individual, was also referred to the species in the 2015 study. It had been found at a kilometre distance from the holotype.

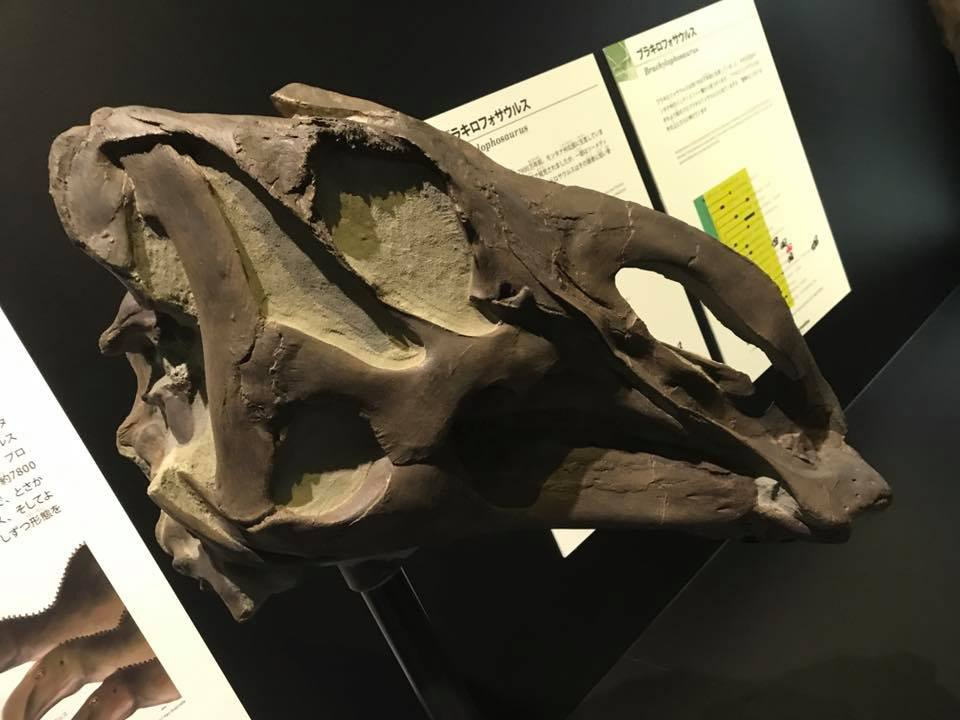
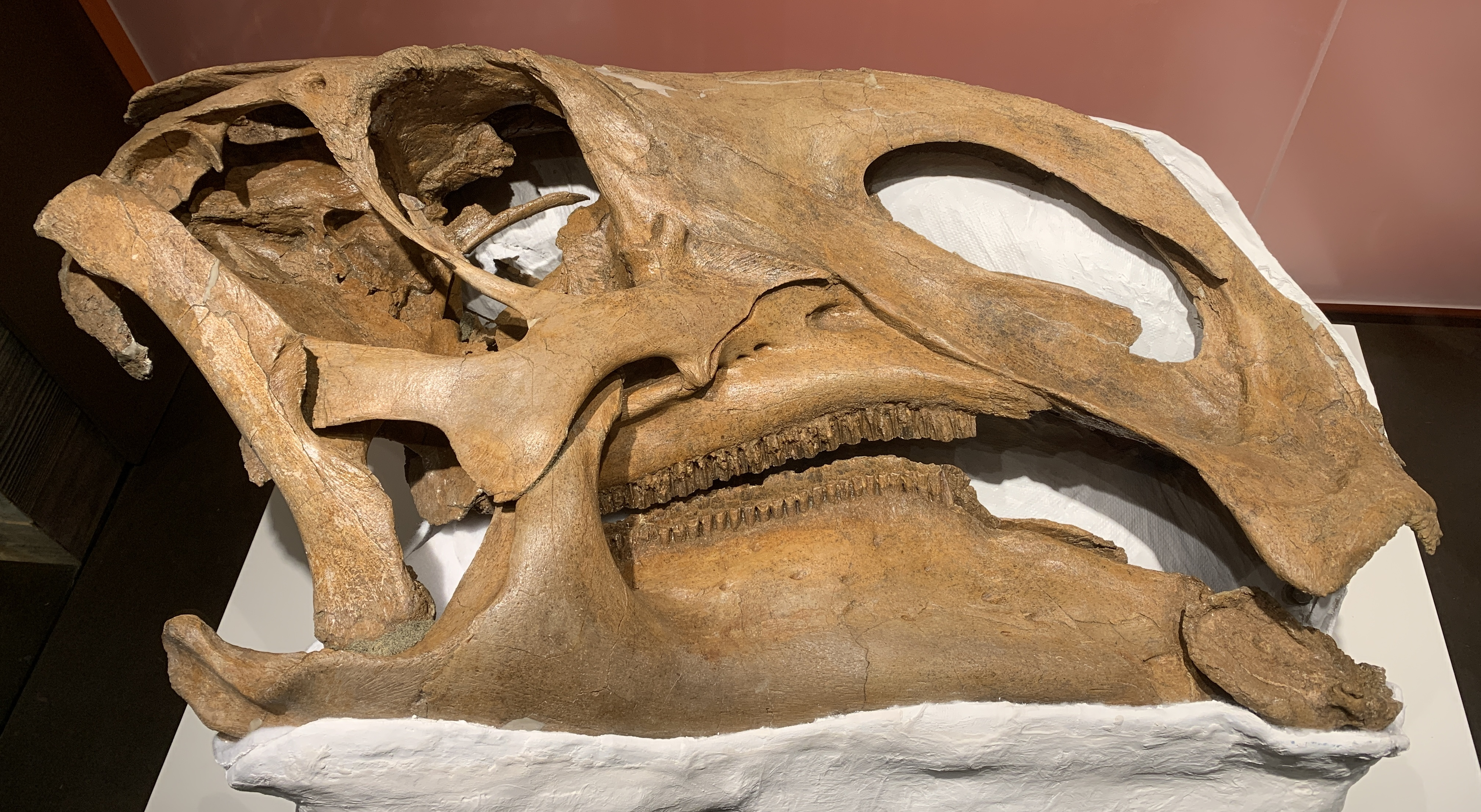
Reconstructed skull of Probrachylophosaurus (left) and complete skull of Brachylophosaurus (right); note the longer crest in Brachylophosaurus

In 2021, three specimens from the upper layers of the Foremost Formation were referred to the genus Probrachylophosaurus, though not to P. bergei. Constituting some of the only skeletal (non-tooth) material of hadrosaurs found in the formation, two of the specimens had been discovered by Wann Langston Jr. in 1957 and 1960 and remained unstudied for sixty years. They include CMN 58592, a partial skeleton including the right ilium, right pubis, both ischia, and a right femur; CMN 9951, a left hindlimb including the femur, tibia, fibula, and partial pes; and TMP 1983.180.001, a partial skeleton including the left dentary, scapula, ulna, rib, ilium, ischium, femur, a right fibula, and two right metatarsals and metacarpals. A smaller left dentary, TMP 1983.180.0001, was also found alongside TMP 1983.180.001. Based on their relative position between the prior Probrachylophosaurus material in Judith River and the base of the Foremost Formation, the Foremost specimens date to between 80.45 and 79.5 million years old. This makes these specimens the oldest document specimens belonging to Brachylophosaurini in Alberta, older specimens of the brachylophosaurin genus Acristavus are known from Montana and Utah.

Another possible specimen of Probrachylophosaurus is a problematic specimen named Brachylophosaurus goodwini, found in a slightly lower section of the Judith River Formation. Established as a second species of Brachylophosaurus in 1988 by Horner, its validity has been disputed. Some studies consider it a synonym of Brachylophosaurus canadensis, whereas the 2015 study naming Probrachylophosaurus considered it unable to be identified at the species level, while noting some anatomical traits distinguishing which could support its erection as a distinct genus of brachylophosaur in the future. However, a 2021 paper studying growth in the genus Maiasaura noted these traits, relating to the depth of depressions on the frontal, could vary over the lifespan of hadrosaurs. Therefore, they considered it possible that B. goodwini merely represented a younger specimen of P. bergei. If true, this would make P. bergei a junior synonym of B. goodwini; however, the study refrained from making a definite assignment or taking nomenclatural action due to the poor preservation of "B. goodwini" preventing definite conclusions about its identity.

== Description ==
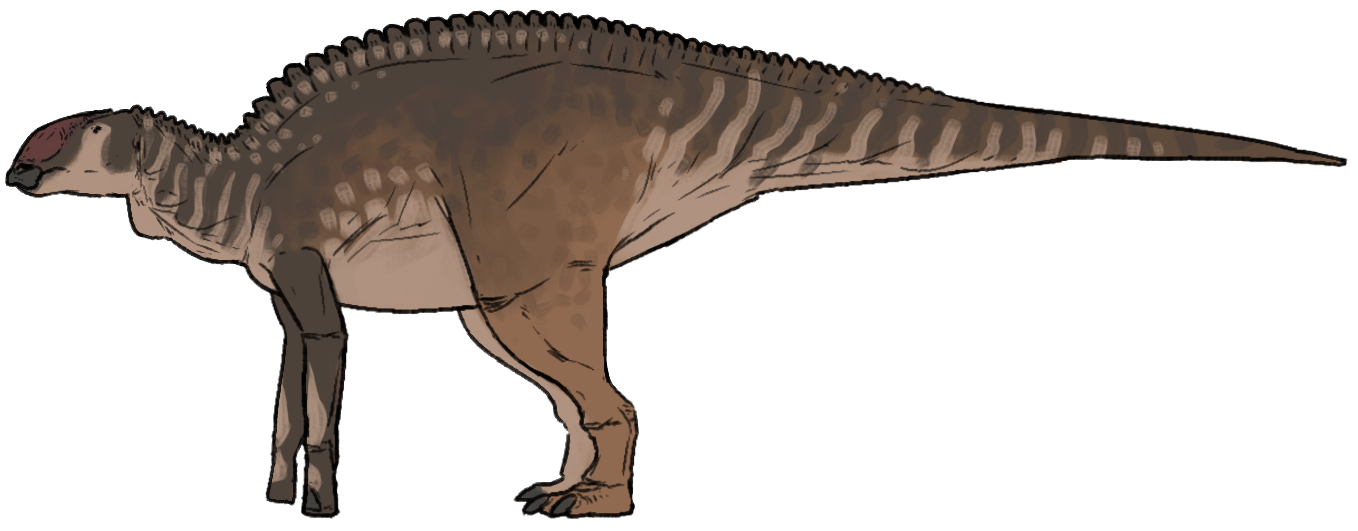
Speculative life restoration

As a hadrosaur, Probrachylophosaurus would have been a large quadrupedal animal with gracile forelimbs, longer more robust hindlimbs, and a long, tall horizontal tail stiffened by ossified tendons. A large hadrosaur, the holotype is the largest brachysaurolophin specimen known. Its size has been estimated at 10 metres (33 ft) in length. Body mass estimate suggests that the holotype was 4.3 metric tons (4.7 short tons) at time of death, and was close to maximum size. In addition to its unique crest, which was short, paddle-shaped, and raised in the centre, Probrachylophosaurus can be distinguished by its unique combination of traits (a differential diagnosis) rather than entirely unique traits (autapomorphies). In particular, Probrachylophosaurus shows a distinctly intermediate condition between the anatomy of the earlier crestless relative Acristavus and its possible descendant Brachylophosaurus. Some traits are shared with the former, some with the latter, and others show a condition in between both. In general, the jugal, dentary, and lacrimal bones closely resemble those of Acristavus, the frontal, quadrate, and squamosal are intermediate, and the braincase and nasal bones are extremely similar to those of Brachylophosaurus. No known trait of the skull is more similar to Maiasaura than to at least one of Acristavus or Brachylophosaurus. The anatomy of the postcranium (the body excluding the head) is essentially indistinguishable from that of Brachylophosaurus and Acristavus.

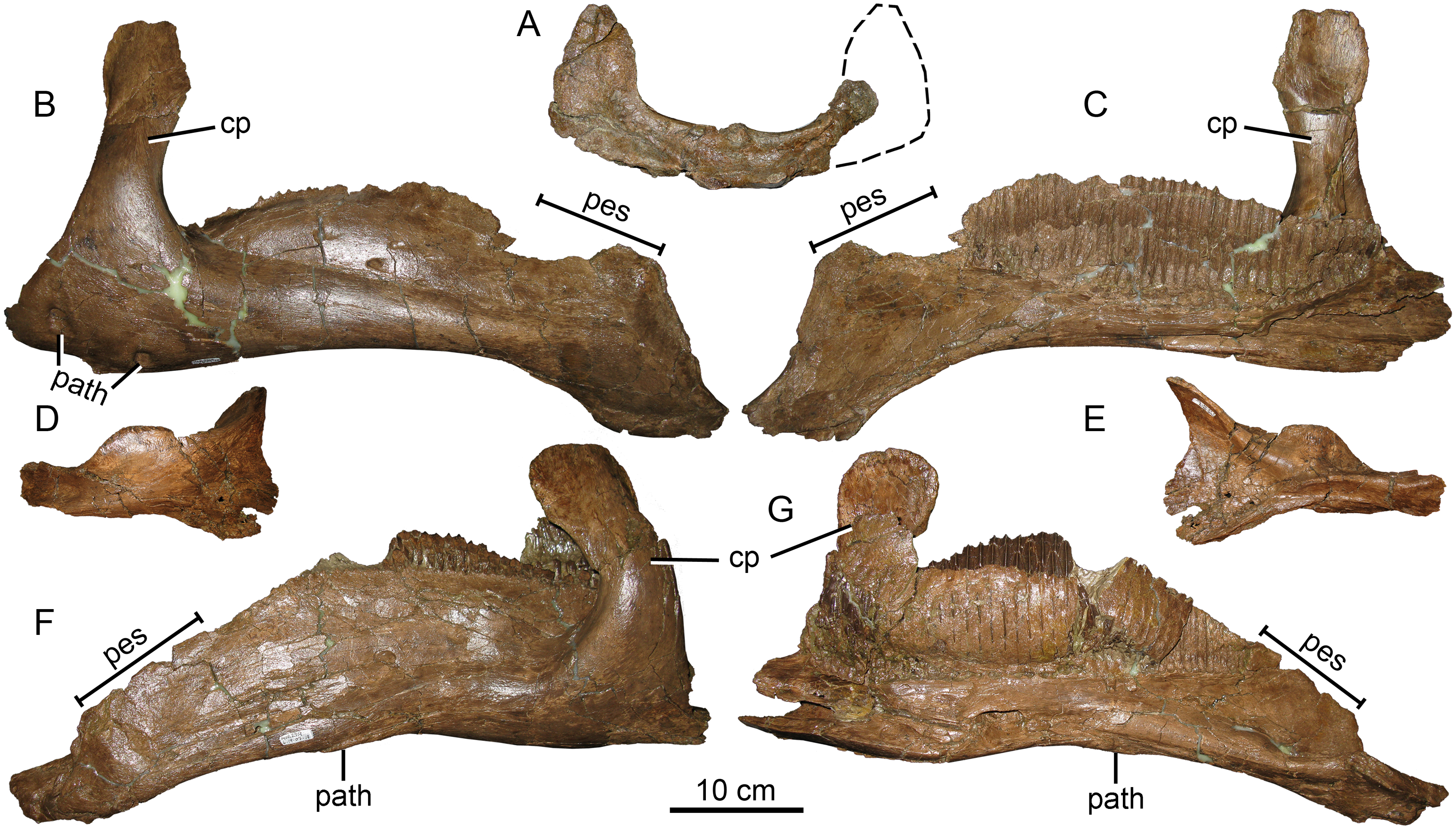
Predentary (A), right dentary (B-C), left dentary F-G), and surangular (D-E)

The front of the mouth would have borne a large beak, as in other hadrosaurs. This was formed on the upper jaw by the premaxilla, which in Probrachylophosaurus formed a wide oral margin that was deflected downwards (similar to Brachylophosaurus, but unlike other saurolophines). Behind the premaxilla, the maxilla bore the teeth of the upper jaw. It is similar to that of other brachylophosaurs in most observable respects, sharing a large opening known as a foramen with other members of the group. The front and back of the maxilla processes elongated processes (the anterior and posterior processes), with are broken but appear to have been similar to those of Brachylophosaurus. On the lower jaw, the beak was formed by the predentary bone, which was roughly twice as wide as long with squared off front corners. Both dentaries (lower jawbones) attached to their respective side of the predentary, allowing motion for chewing. Each dentary had a downward sloping toothless section at the front and prominent dental batteries with hundreds of teeth farther back. In Probrachylophosaurus this toothless slope is short, as in Acristavus and Maiasaura but unlike Brachylophosaurus, and begins sloping downwards immediately in front of the first row of teeth, like Acristavus but unlike Brachylophosaurus and Maiasaura where it has a small horizontal section. Behind the toothrow, the dentary articulated with the rest of the skull through its attachment to the angular and surangular bones as well as an upward projection of the dentary known as the coronoid process. The surangular is similar in all respects to Acristavus and Brachylophosaurus, while the angular is unpreserved in known specimens. The coronoid process lacked a small sharp projecting at its top corner, present Maiasaura and Brachylophosaurus but also lacking in Acristavus. The roof of the mouth is largely unknown, but the known palatine bone is similar to Brachylophosaurus.

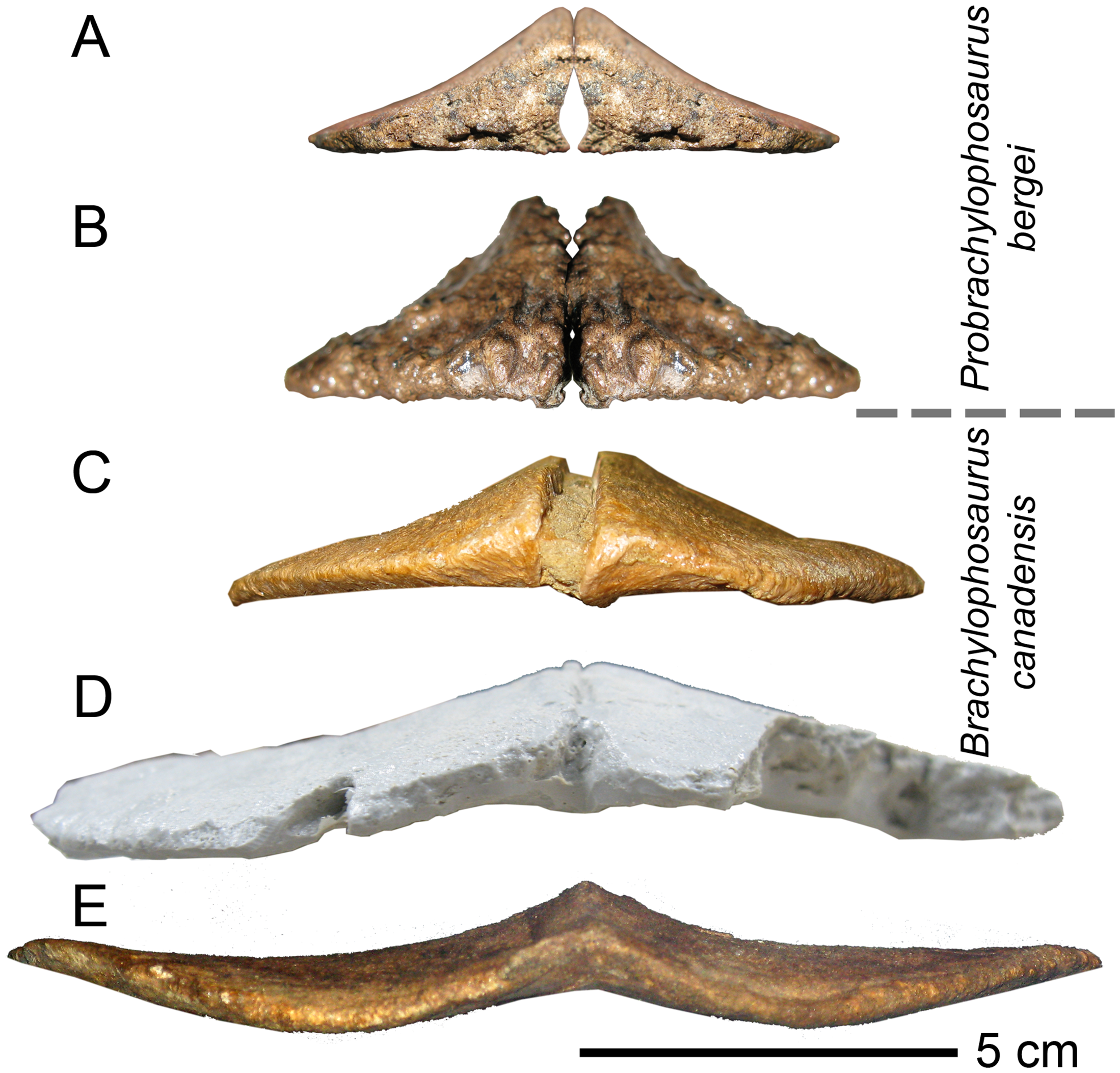
Paired nasals of Probrachylophosaurus (A-B) and Brachylophosaurus (C-E) as seen from behind; note triangular shape with raised centre in Probrachylophosaurus

Comparatively little is known of the face of the species, with the nasal (which would have formed much of the top of the snout) unpreserved aside from the crest. The type of the eye socket is formed by a portion of the frontals; this region is robust, similar to the condition in the robustly built Acristavus The lacrimal bone forms the front of the eye socket; it is partially preserved and shows a robust anatomy, over twice as thick as that of Brachylophosaurus and also similar to that of Acristavus. At the back of the bone is a region where it contacted the jugal; this contact is also robust, and has a convex shape on the bottom, whereas it is concave in Brachylophosaurus. The jugal itself forms the lower rim of the eye socket and the temporal fenestra (a hole on the side of the skull). As in other hadrosaurs, it possessed three processes: rostral process extending forward to meet the maxilla, an upward postorbital process to form the back of the eye socket and meet the postorbital, and a rear quadruatojugal process to meet the quadratojugal bone. Its rostral process had a straight bottom edge (like Maiasaura and Acristavus, but sigmoidal in Brachylophosaurus) and had upward and downward projections (the caudodorsal and caudoventral apexes). The caudoventral apex was slightly further back (similar to Acristavus, whereas both are aligned in Brachylophosaurus). On the caudodorsal apex, a small process that attaches to the palatine bone is similar to that of Acristavus in subadults but grows into a Brachylophosaurus-like condition in adults. The postorbital process is only partially known, but appears similar to Brachylophosaurus. The quadratojugal process had a constricted base, but this constriction was lesser than in Acristavus and especially Maiasaura and Brachylophosaurus. Resultantly, the lower back section of the jugal was only slightly concave.

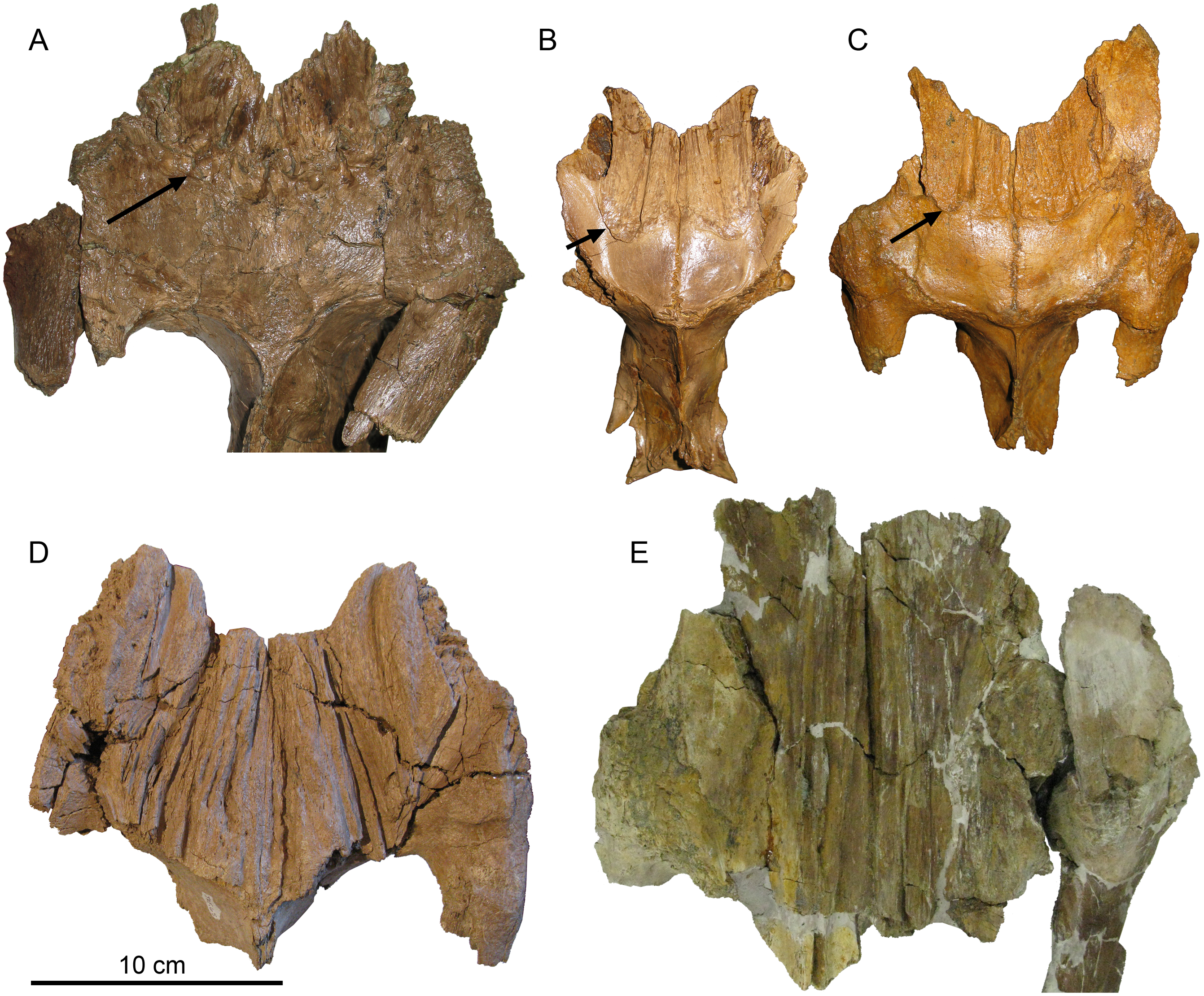
Frontals of Probrachylophosaurus (A), subadult Brachylophosaurus (B-C), and adult Brachylophosaurus (D-E); arrows highlight partial coverage of nasofrontal suture striations in former two, while they cover the entire fronal in the latter

The most distinguishing aspect of Probrachylophosaurus is its solid paddle-shaped crest formed by the paired left and right nasal bones projecting above the back of the skull. This is a feature shared with the related genera Brachylophosaurus and Ornatops, but the exact anatomy in Probrachylophosaurus is distinct. Unlike the relatively flat crest of Brachylophosaurus, that of Probrachylophosaurus is raised in the centre, forming a triangular cross section with the top points forming an angle of less than 130° (112° in the known adult specimen). The end of the crest terminates in a v-shape, unlike the u-shape of Brachylophosaurus. Whether the crest varied between “slender” and “robust” morphologies between individuals, as in Brachylophosaurus, is unknown. The crest is shorter than that of Brachylophosaurus, and hangs less than 2 cm above the supratemporal fenestra (holes on top of the rear skull). Unlike in Brachylophosaurus, where the frontals directly support the base of the crest, that of Probrachylophosaurus is formed entirely by the nasal bone, with the frontals serving only as the attachment point. To function as this attachment point, the frontal bones the nasal articulates with have long striations that formed the nasofrontal suture. While in adult Brachylophosaurus these cover the entire top of the frontal to support the longer crest, in Probrachylophosaurus they only cover around half of the frontal (59% coverage). Ornatops shows an intermediate condition where most but not all of the frontals are covered up (65% coverage). Younger individuals of Brachylophosaurus show a condition more similar to Probrachylophosaurus (54-69% coverage). Likewise, the back of the frontals slightly overhang the supratemporal fenestra in adult Brachylophosaurus but not in subadults or Probrachylophosaurus.

The rear of the skull is formed by the parietal, squamosal, quadrates, and the various bones of the braincase. The parietal and squamosal make up the top of the back of the head. Every aspect of the parietal itself is consistent with Brachylophosaurus, but distinctions can be found in the squamosal. Along the top of the parietal is a central parasagittal crest; in Probrachylophosaurus, Ornatops, and Acristavus it appears to bifurcate due to contact of the front processes of left and right squamosal bones. In Maiasaura the parietal partially separates these bones, and in Brachylophosaurus the two squamosals are entirely separated by the parietal. The left and right quadrate form the rear corners of each side of the skull. In Probrachylophosaurus and Acristavus the quadrates are straight in shape, whereas the top half leans backward in Brachylophosaurus and Maiasaura. The posterodorsal process, which connects the quadrate to the squamosal, is especially large compared to other brachylophosaurs. It is slightly less tall in Brachylophosaurus, slightly less protruding in Maiasaura, and both in Acristavus. The braincase forms the back of the skull and encircles the brain, with various holes allowing the passage of cranial nerves. As the various bones fuse in adulthood, their fine anatomy is difficult to assess. In general, however, it is similar to the braincases found in Brachylophosaurus and Ornatops. A key feature of these genera is the opening for cranial nerve VII, which is slightly behind and below that for cranial nerve V rather than directly behind it as in Acristavus.

== Classification ==
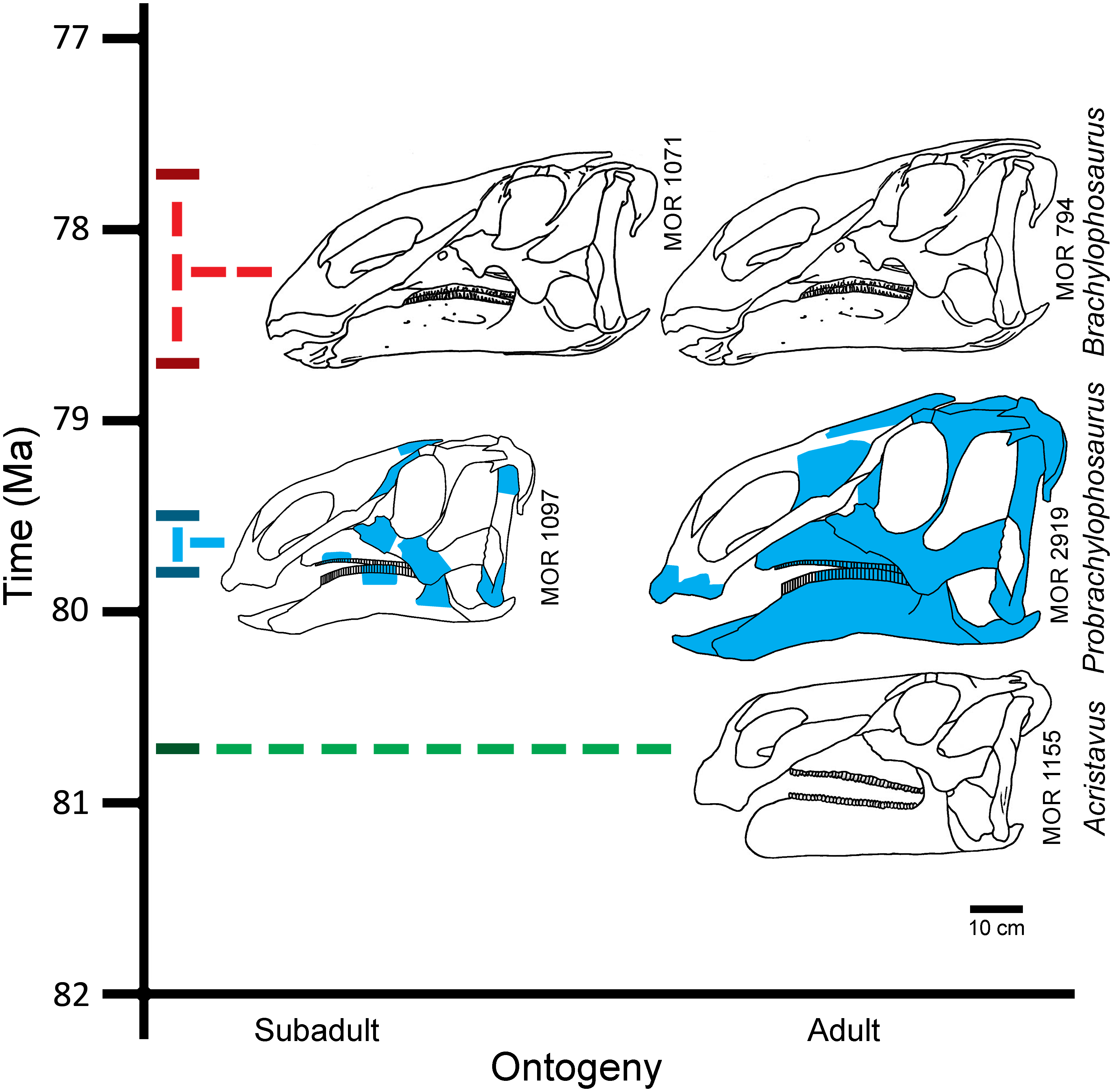
Diagram showing proposed evolutionary sequence from Acristavus through Probrachylophosaurus and Brachylophosaurus, as well as change through growth

Probrachylophosaurus is a hadrosaur, belonging to the solid-crested subfamily Saurolophinae (alternatively Hadrosaurinae) and specifically to a lineage known as Brachylophosaurini. Within the original 2015 study by Freedman-Fowler and Horner, phylogenetic analyses were performed based on the datasets of two different prior studies (one based on 2010 study by Albert Prieto-Márquez, the other on a 2011 study by Terry A. Gates and colleagues). In the former, Probrachylophosaurus was found to be the sister taxon to a grouping of Brachylophosaurus and Maiasaura. Contrastingly, the latter found Probrachylophosaurus and Brachylophosaurus to be sister taxa, with Maiasaura as an outgroup to the two. In both analyses, Acristavus was supported as outside of the grouping of the prior three genera. Thus, an evolutionary scenario was interpreted wherein the geologically older Acristavus was either ancestral to other brachylophosaurs or closely related to their ancestor, and the split of the Maiasaura and Brachylophosaurus lineages was uncertainly either before or after the evolution of Probrachylophosaurus.

All later phylogenetic analyses would support the latter interpretation, wherein Probrachylophosaurus and Brachylophosaurus are close relatives to the exclusion of Maisaura. A 2021 study documented Maiasaura specimens from Alberta, Canada, dating to the same time Brachylophosaurus lived in the region. This was seen as supporting the splitting of Maiasaura from the lineage including Probrachylophosaurus and Brachylophosaurus, rather than being part of their line of descent.

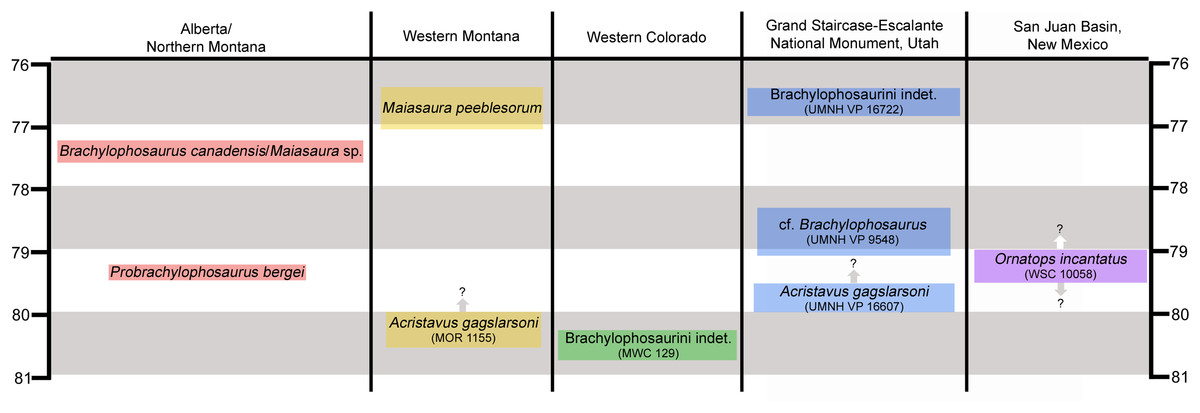
Table showcasing distribution of brachylophosaur fossils in North America; number scales indicate age in millions of years

A 2021 study by Andrew T. McDonald, Gates, Freedman-Fowler, and Douglas G. Wolfe documented a new genus of brachylophosaur, Ornatops, from the Menefee Formation in New Mexico. Their phylogenetic analysis, based on a prior dataset of McDonald's, found a grouping of Probrachylophosaurus, Brachylophosaurus, and Ornatops to the exclusion of Maiasaura, with Acristavus an outgroup of all four others, similar to the second phylogenetic analysis of the 2015 study. The former three are united by the anatomy of the suture of the frontals and nasals, which consists of long striations along the frontals expanded backwards to support the wide, backward projecting head crest known from Probrachylophosaurus and Brachylophosaurus (and inferred to be present in Ornatops). Maiasaura also possesses a crest, but it is very different in structure and does not project over the back skull.

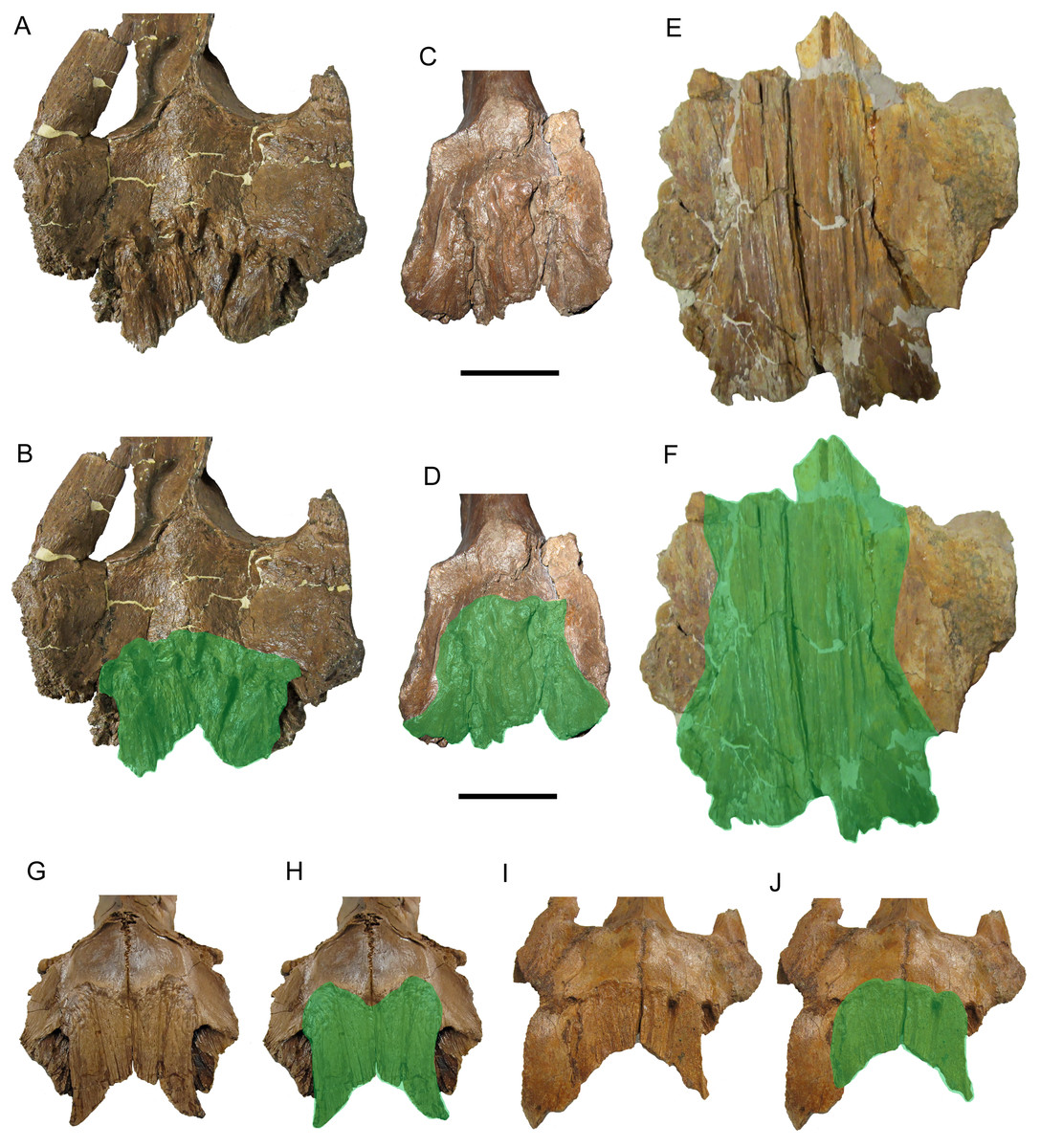
Frontals of Probrachylophosaurus (A-B), Ornatops (C-D), adult Brachylophosaurus (E-F), and subadult Brachylopohsaurus (G-J), with the nasofrontal suture highlighted in green

It was considered possible that Ornatops, whose nasofrontal suture is expanded more than Probrachylophosaurus but less than Brachylophosaurus, represented an intermediate form in brachylophosaurin evolution (with Acristavus showing an ancestral crestless condition with an unmodified suture). However, the phylogenetic analysis could not resolve the relationship between the three related genera. The possible evolutionary relationships are also complicated by the presence of Probrachylophosaurus in the North and Ornatops in the South of the United States, implicating dispersal events or the thus far unknown presence of these taxa in the opposite region (similar Acristavus, found in Utah and Montana). Thus, the possibility the relationships between these taxa are more complicated and that nasofrontal suture expansion may have occurred independently in Ornatops were not ruled out.

The phylogenetic analysis of the 2021 Ornatops paper is shown below:

- Hadrosauridae
  - Hadrosaurus
  - Euhadrosauria
    - Lambeosaurinae
    - Saurolophinae
      - - Kritosaurini
        - - Saurolophini
          - Edmontosaurini
      - Brachylophosaurini
        - Acristavus
        - - Maiasaura
          - - Probrachylophosaurus
            - Ornatops
            - Brachylophosaurus

Brachylophosaurini, along with Kritosaurini, would go on to be replaced by the lineages Saurolophini and Edmontosaurini through the middle Campanian and into the Maastrichtian in North America, though Brachylophosaurini would persist in Asia as shown by the Maastrichtian genus Wulagasaurus.

== Paleobiology ==
=== Growth and histology ===
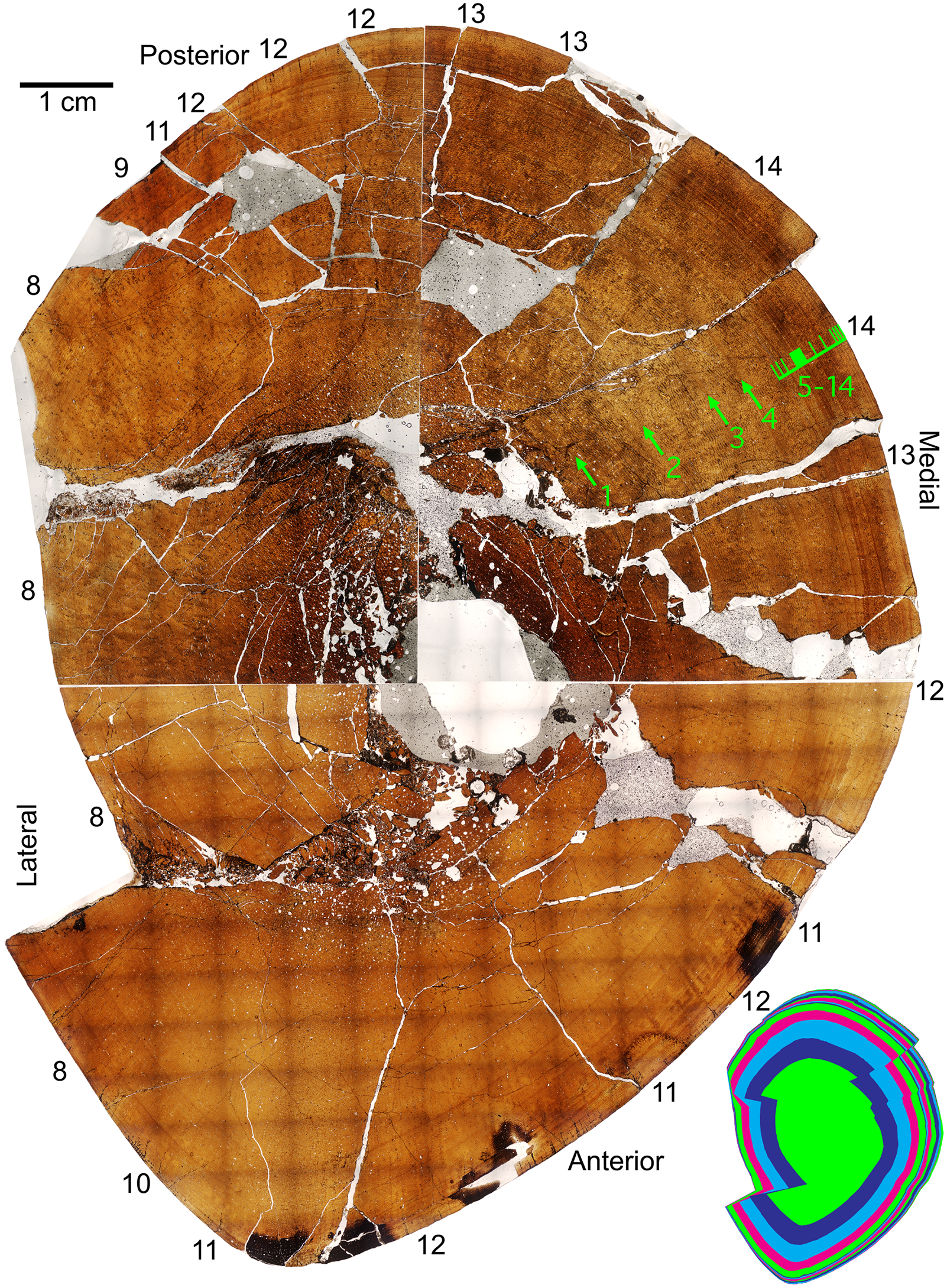
Cross section of Probrachylophosaurus MOR 2919 tibia, showing lines of arrested growth (LAGs)

A cross section of the right tibia was used histological study in the 2015 paper. Limb bones like these contain lines of arrested growth (LAG), deposited annually in the form of rings as the animal grows and then covered by later rings. Consequently, the age of the animal may be determined by counting the number of rings in the cross section. When an animal completely finishes the growth of its skeleton, the lack of continued growth of the bone causes the lines to heavily concentrated in what is known as an external fundamental system (EFS). In the tested specimen of Probrachylophosaurus MOR 2919, fourteen LAGs indicated the animal was fourteen years of age at death. The outermost rings were closely spaced but did not represent an EFS, and therefore the animal had not ceased its physical growth but was likely very close to its maximum size. Especially close spacing between the fifth, sixth, and seventh LAGs may indicate a period of limited growth when resources were scarce.

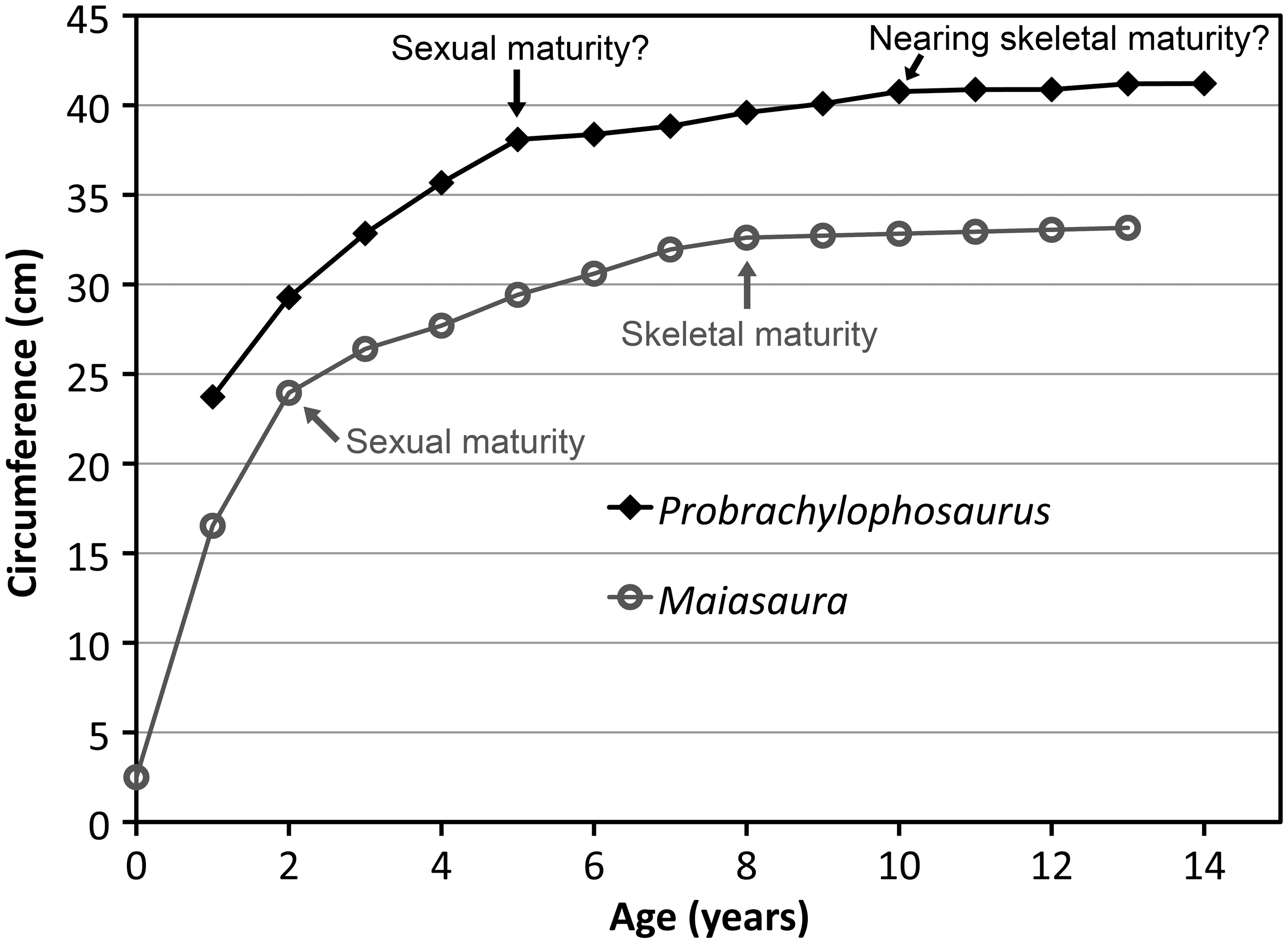
Graph of tibia circumstance across the life history of Probrachylophosaurus MOR 2919 and a specimen of Maiasaura, indicating acquisition of sexual and skeletal maturity in each individual

Despite only testing one specimen, the pattern of LAGs can illustrated how Probrachylophosaurus as a species would have grown. Similar to other hadrosaurs, large spacing between early rings are indicative of extreme growth in the first few years of life as the animal approaches most of its adult size quickly before slowing down to gradually approach the remaining amount of maximum size. Unlike the rest of the body, the display crest on the top of the head experiences much of its growth very late in the life history of the animal. This is seen across hadrosaurs such as Brachylophosaurus, as well as modern analogues such as cassowaries that possess casques on their heads. In Probrachylophosaurus, this can be observed due to the fusion of much of the skull bones (indicative of maturity) but lacking fusion in the nasofrontal complex (indicating it may have continued to grow). Due to the advanced age of the animal, however, it is not likely the crest had sufficient growing left to later become as large as the crest of Brachylophosaurus; thus, their distinctly sized crests are a legitimate distinguishing feature.

In addition to observing the cession of growth (skeletal maturity), the onset of sexual maturity can be observed due to changes in pattern of growth. In MOR 2919, this appears to happen at five years of age. This contrasted with a tested specimen of the related genus Maiasaura, where sexual maturity occurred earlier between two and three years of age. Skeletal maturity also occurred earlier in the tested Maiasaura, around ten years of age while MOR 2919 was only approaching it at fourteen years of age when it died. They cautioned, however, that age of reaching skeletal maturity can vary between individuals and a greater sample size as needed to determine if Probrachylophosaurus truly finished aging later than Maiasaura. Later research on a large sample of Maiasaura specimens would find it reached skeletal maturity after an average of 8.25 years of growth. A later 2020 study on hadrosaur growth reanalyzed Probrachylophosaurus and Maiasaura, finding the former to have a maximum growth rate between 3.64 and 4.64 years of age, growing 855 kilograms (1,885 lb) per year at that point in life. Maiasaura was found to peak in growth between 2.36 and 2.79 years of age, putting on 884 kilograms (1,949 lb) per year. By nine years of age, MOR 2919 had reached 95% of its size at death. A similar timing of 95% of maximum size is observed in Maiasaura and Edmontosaurus.

=== Pathology ===
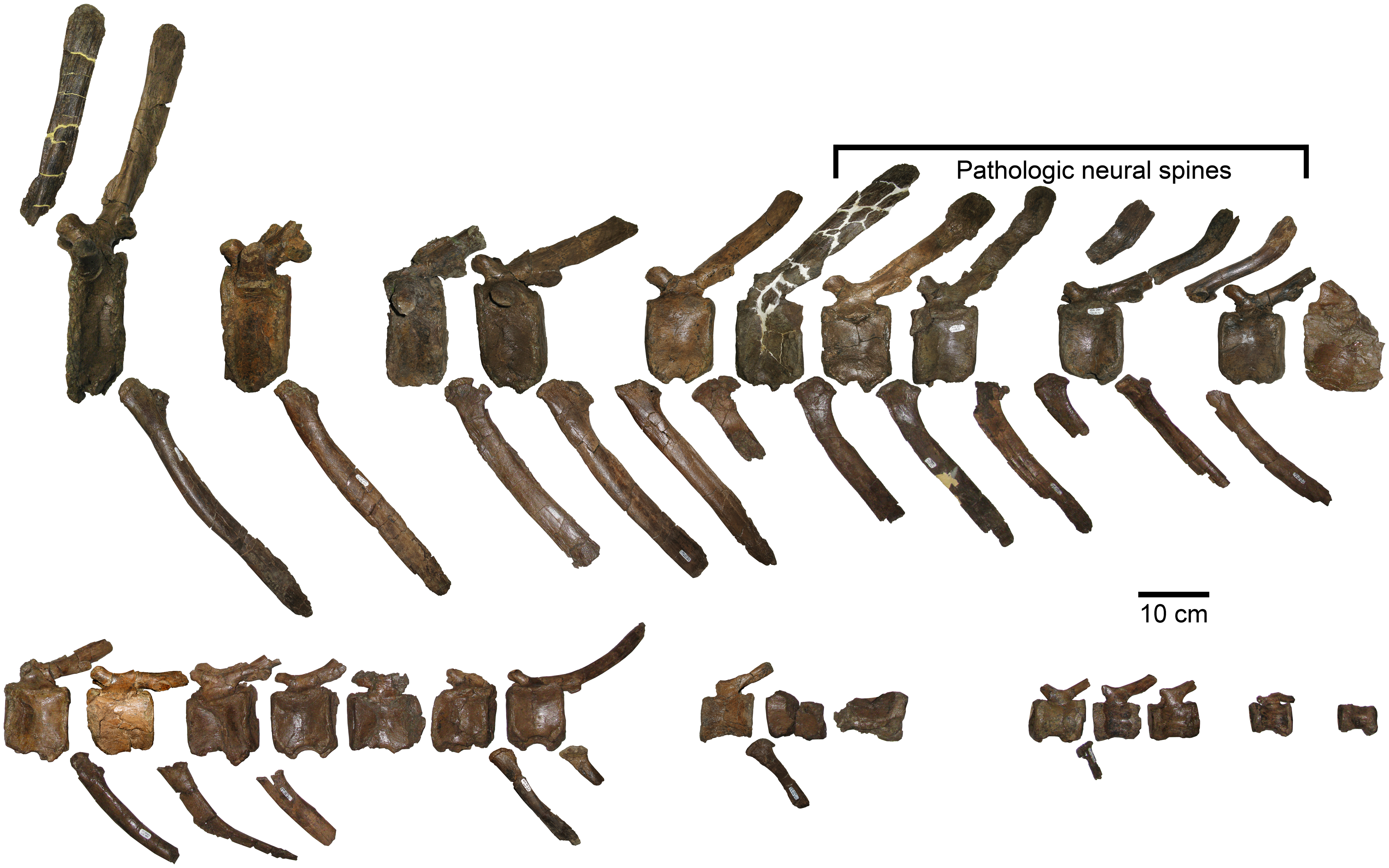
Caudal vertebrae of Probrachylophosaurus, highlighting deformed and healed neural spines

MOR 2919, the type specimen of P. bergei, shows several injuries. Across the dentaries, three circular depressions can be seen surrounded by rings of raised bone. Both the right second and fourth metatarsals (foot bones) preserved in the specimen show a rugose surface texture on the point of contact with the unpreserved third metatarsal, and the ends of the tibiae and fibulae of both legs show similar texturing, indicating that the injury or disease immpacted the feet and legs on both sides. Six of the vertebrae from the middle of the tail show breakage and healing across their neural spines. Other sections of the tail do not show these injuries, but as the tail vertebrae were disarticulated it is unknown if the region of damage may have extended beyond the six preserved vertebrate. Injuries along this section of the tail are common in hadrosaurs. Various proposals have been made for their cause including attacks from predators, other members of their herds stepping on their tails, biomechanical stress, and damage occurring in females due to being mounted by males during mating. A 2026 study found the mating mechanism to be most likely and ruled out the other hypotheses as failing to explain the pattern of damage seen across hadrosaurs specimens. Consequently, individuals with damaged mid-tail neural spines such as MOR 2919 may represent females.

== Paleoecology ==
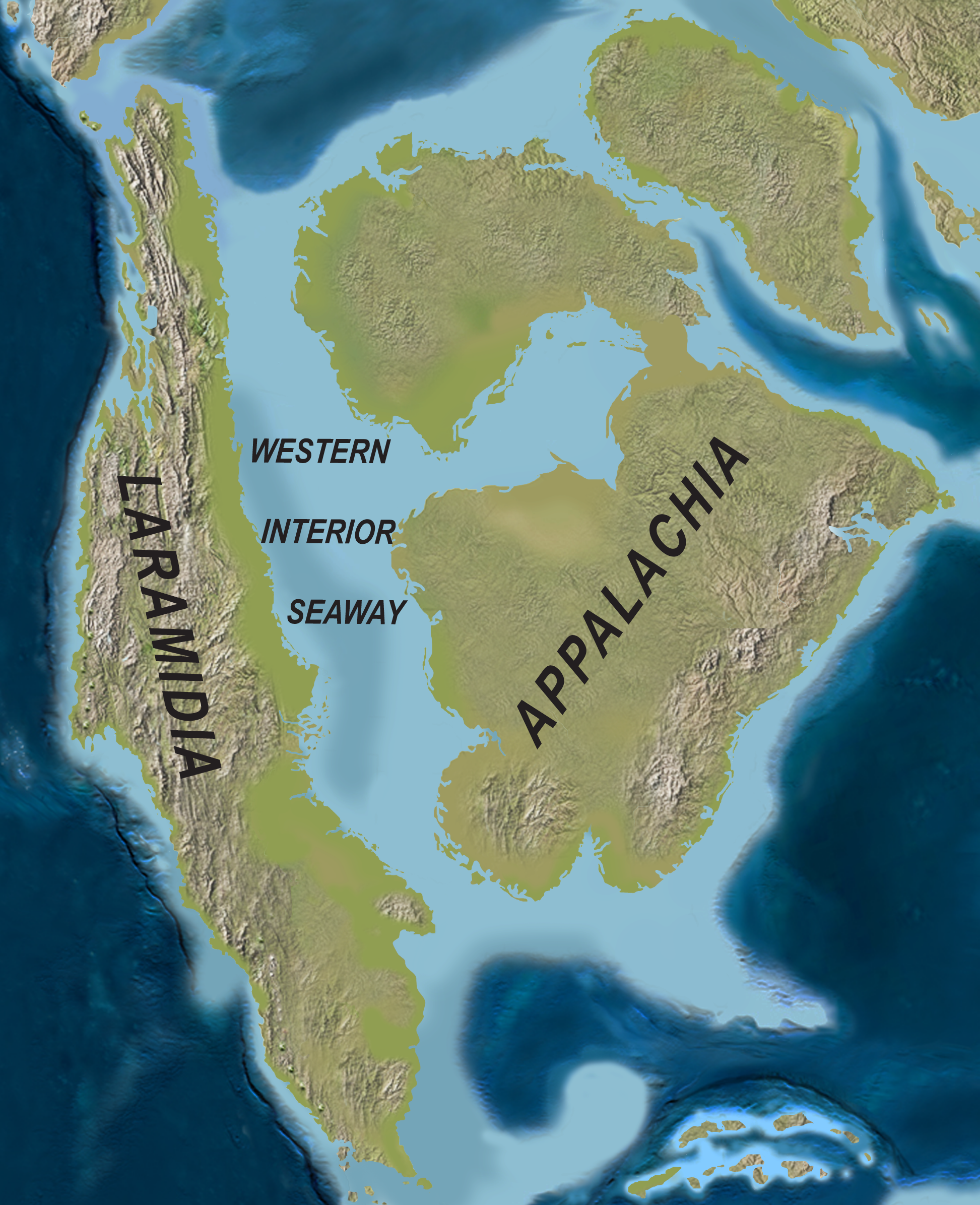
Map of North America in the Late Cretaceous, showing the Western Interior Seaway; Probrachylophosaurus lived in Laramidia

Probrachylophosaurus is known from rocks deposited in the lower Judith Formation of Montana and the Foremost Formation of Alberta. The latter is part of the Belly River Group, with the Foremost Formation preceding the more famous Oldman Formation and Dinosaur Park Formation, while Judith River is the American equivalent spanning the length of the Belly River Group. Some older studies unite all of these formations into the Judith River Group, but conventions across the American-Canadian border have led to the continued classification of them as geologically separate. Fossils belonging to Probrachylophosaurus were deposited between 80.45 and 79.5 million years ago in the early Campanian age of the Late Cretaceous.

At this time, Alberta and Montana were not inland but instead coastlines along the Western Interior Seaway, which divided North America into two isolated halves for millions of years in the Cretaceous period. To the West, the Laramide Orogeny was beginning, pushing up the Rocky Mountains. Volcanic activity fed the waters systems that fed into the Western Interior Seaway, though most of the formation itself represents terrestrial strata. Prior to deposition of the Belly River Group and Judith River Formation, the Claggett Sea (part of the larger Western Interior) covered central Alberta and Montana. The fauna of the formations lived during the time of the Claggett's recession, ending when the Bearpaw Sea grows and the area again becomes marine. The Foremost Formation was deposited during the beginnings of this transition, with its lower layers corresponding to coastal estuaries, lagoons, and barrier islands. By comparison, the Judith River Formation was deposited slightly later when the Claggett had more fully receded, and most of it represents terrestrial strata. Probracylophosaurus specifically is from a locality known as Kennedy Coullee, which is part of the lower McClelland Ferry Member of the Judith River Formation, equivalent to the Oldman Formation in Alberta. This section is thought to represent a fluvial floodplain ecosystem. The Two Medicine Formation, also in Montana, spans a similar time and represents more arid upland ecosystems further inland.

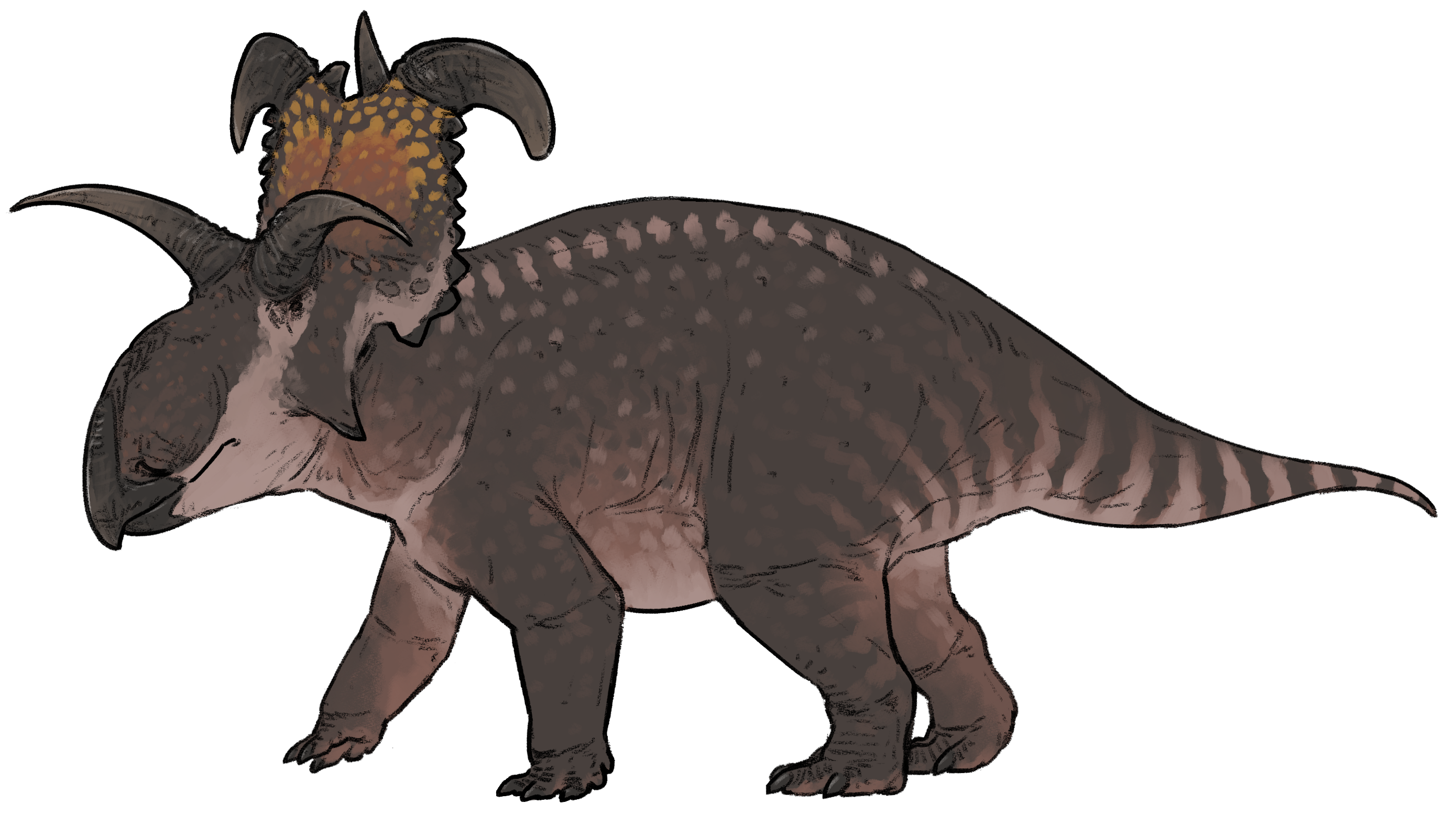
Probrachylophosaurus lived with a variety of centrosaurs, such as this Lokiceratops

During this period of marine recession, a diverse community of dinosaurs flourished. Probrachylophosaurus would have lived with distinct contemporaries in the Foremost and Judith River Formations. Comparatively few taxa are known from the poorly sampled Foremost Formation, but include the centrosaur Xenoceratops, the pachycephalosaur Colepiocephale, and the predatory tyrannosaur Thanatotheristes. Teeth also attest the presence of dromaeosaurs, ankylosaurids, and nodosaurs. Beyond dinosaurs, a variety of smaller vertebrates resided in the marine, brackish, and fresh waters of the ecosystem. These include hybodontids, ratfish, ray, sharks, gars, frogs, salamanders, various turtles, lizards including mosasaurs, and champsosaurs.

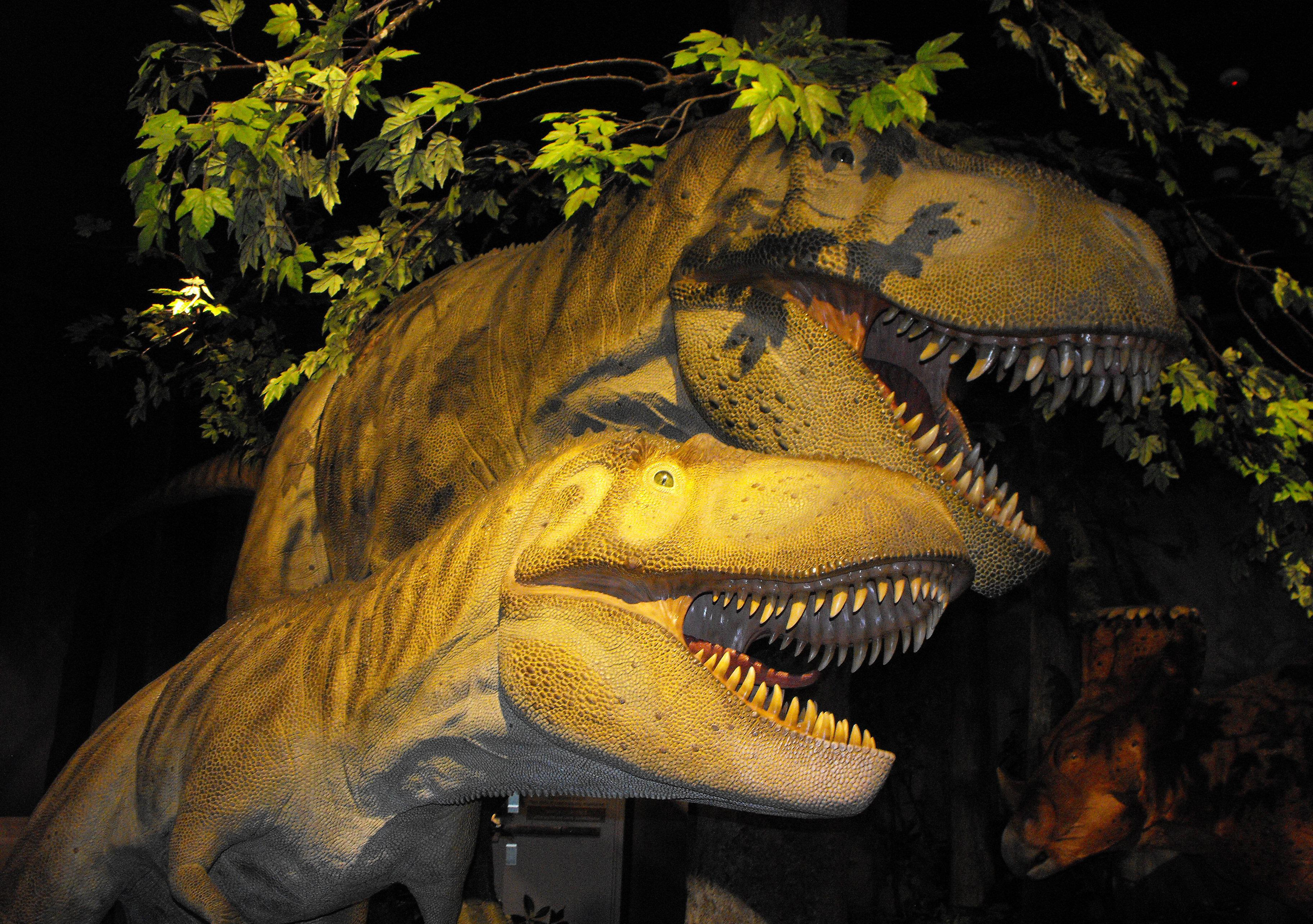
Probrachylophosaurus lived alongside tyrannosaurid predators, such as these Daspletosaurus (models at the Canadian Museum of Nature)

The Judith River Formation preserves a more complete fossil record, but fossils found there are split between subdivisions of different ages. Brachylophosaurus, for example, is also known from Judith River but comes from higher strata and did not overlap in time with Probrachylophosaurus. Dinosaurs that are known to have lived around the same time as Probrachylophosaurus include the centrosaurs Lokiceratops, Medusaceratops, and Wendiceratops. "Avaceratops", a centrosaur taxon established based on a fragmentary juvenile, is also from the lower McClelland Ferry Member. However, its validity as a distinguishable taxon has been doubted. Colepiocephale also persisted from the Foresmost Formation into the lower Judith River. Fragmentary remains from the lower Judith River had been tentatively identified as representing the tyrannosaurs Gorgosaurus and Daspletosaurus, though more diagnostic remains of these taxa come from a few million years after Probrachylophosaurus lived.

The evolution of brachylophosaurs has been proposed to be linked to habitat preference. Maiasaura is primarily known from inland, upland Two Medicine deposits, whereas Brachylophosaurus is known from the coastal lowlands of the Judith River Formation. It was suggested that they diverged from an ancestral upland form, with their distinct nasal anatomies evolving to suit their respective ecosystems. The concept of environmental sensitivity amongst dinosaur faunas has been challenged, with analysis of dinosaur microfossil records indicating that similar dinosaurs lived across a variety of environments. However, it has been argued that because microfossils such as teeth cannot detect fine taxonomic distinctions (as related species would share dental anatomy), it remains plausible that habitat preference was a driver of the evolution of hadrosaurs such as the members of Brachylophosaurini. Nonetheless, the discovery that Maiasaura and Brachylophosaurus at least partially overlapped in range in the Oldman Formation indicates a potentially more complex scenario. The discovery of Probrachylophosaurus in the Foremost Formation indicates brachylophosaurs were amongst the first hadrosaurs to colonize the fluvial lowlands following the recession of the Claggett Seaway. Fossilized gut contents from Brachylophosaurus indicate a diet of leaves, consistent with widers studies on the diet of hadrosaurs.
