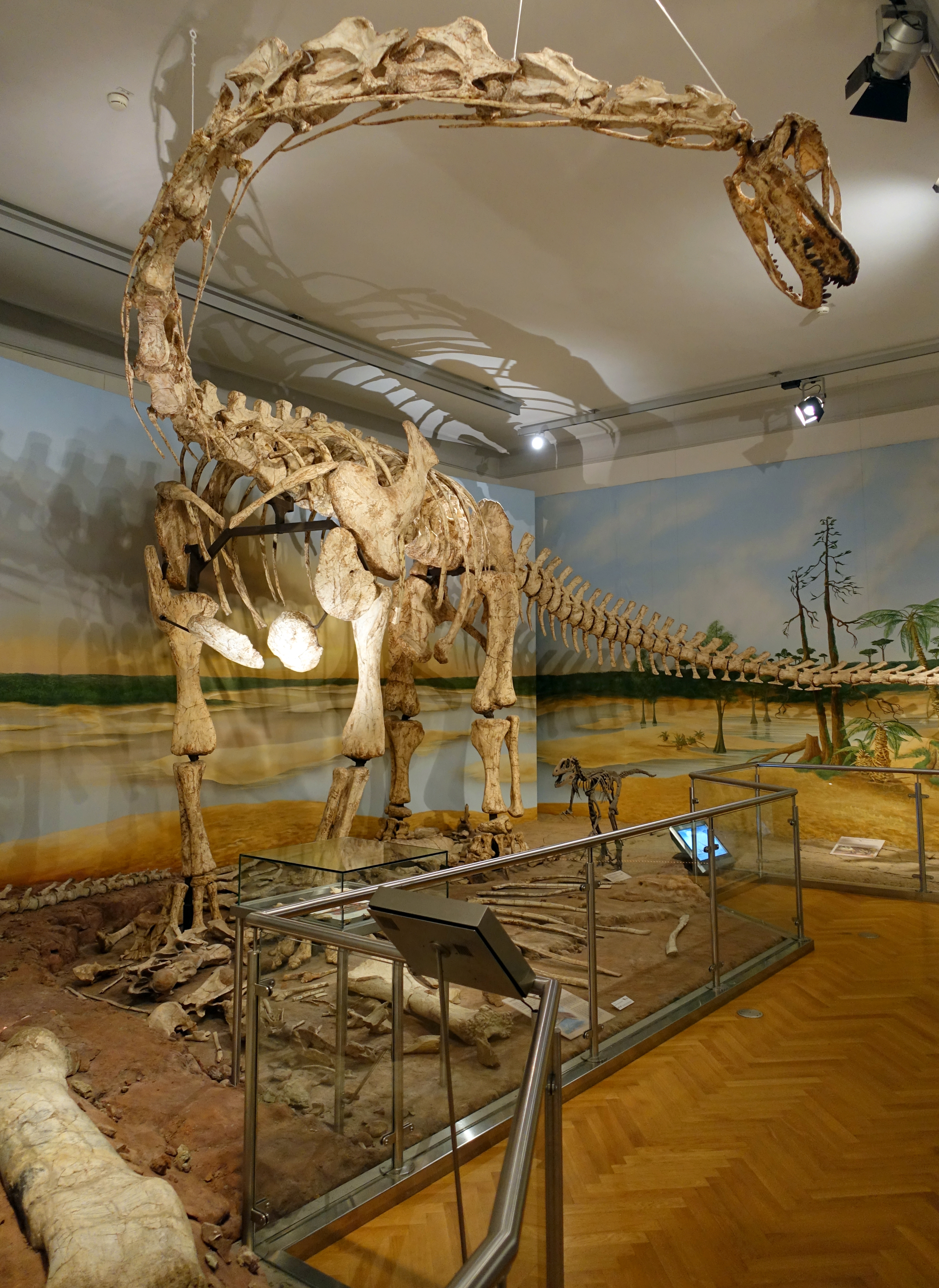
- 3D-printed reconstruction of the holotype skeleton in the Naturkundemuseum Braunschweig; the fossils on the floor are authentic

Scientific classification
- Kingdom: Animalia
- Phylum: Chordata
- Class: Reptilia
- Clade: Dinosauria
- Clade: Saurischia
- Clade: †Sauropodomorpha
- Clade: †Sauropoda
- Clade: †Gravisauria
- Genus: †Spinophorosaurus; Remes et al., 2009
- Species: †S. nigerensis

Binomial name
- †Spinophorosaurus nigerensis Remes et al., 2009

= Spinophorosaurus =

Spinophorosaurus Temporal range: Middle Jurassic, 167 Ma

Middle Jurassic genus of sauropod dinosaur

Spinophorosaurus is a genus of sauropod dinosaur that lived in what is now Niger during the Middle Jurassic period. The first two specimens were excavated in the 2000s by German and Spanish teams under difficult conditions. The skeletons were brought to Europe and digitally replicated, making Spinophorosaurus the first sauropod to have its skeleton 3D printed, and were to be returned to Niger in the future. Together, the two specimens represented most of the skeleton of the genus, and one of the most completely known basal sauropods of its time and place. The first skeleton was made the holotype specimen of the new genus and species Spinophorosaurus nigerensis in 2009; the generic name ("spine-bearing lizard") refers to what was initially thought to be spiked osteoderms, and the specific name (Niger and -ensis) refers to where it was found. A juvenile sauropod from the same area was later assigned to the genus.

The subadult holotype specimen is estimated to have been around 13 m (43 ft) in length, whereas the paratype was about 14 m (46 ft) long. The shoulder height reached by these individuals was estimated at around 4 m (13 ft), and the weight at about 7 metric tons (7.7 short tons). The braincase was short, deep, and broad, and the neuroanatomy was in some ways intermediate between that of basal sauropodomorphs and the more derived neosauropods. The teeth were spatulate (spoon shaped) and had large spaced denticles at the top of the crown, an ancestral feature in sauropods. The neck of Spinophorosaurus is one of the most completely known among sauropods, containing 13 vertebrae. The dorsal vertebrae had multiple small air-filled internal chambers, a feature typical of later more-derived sauropods. The tail was powered by strong musculature and had a rear section that was rather rigid due to long and overlapping chevron bones. Bones originally thought to be osteoderms bearing spikes placed on the tail tip were later suggested to be clavicles.

Spinophorosaurus has been classified as either a very basal sauropod, or inside Eusauropoda, a more derived group. The anatomy, age, and location of specimens indicate that important developments in sauropod evolution may have occurred in North Africa, possibly controlled by climatic zones and plant biogeography. Features of the vestibular apparatus suggest that vision and coordinated eye, head, and neck movements were important in Spinophorosaurus. 3D models of the skeleton have been used to test its range of motion. One study suggests it may have been a high browser, and another examined possible mating postures. Sutures between the neural arches with the centra of the vertebrae were more complex in the front part of the trunk of Spinophorosaurus, since stresses were probably greatest in that region. Spinophorosaurus is known from the Irhazer Shale, a geological formation thought to be Middle Jurassic in age. It was formed by deposits from rivers and lakes in a great river-valley system.

== Discovery ==
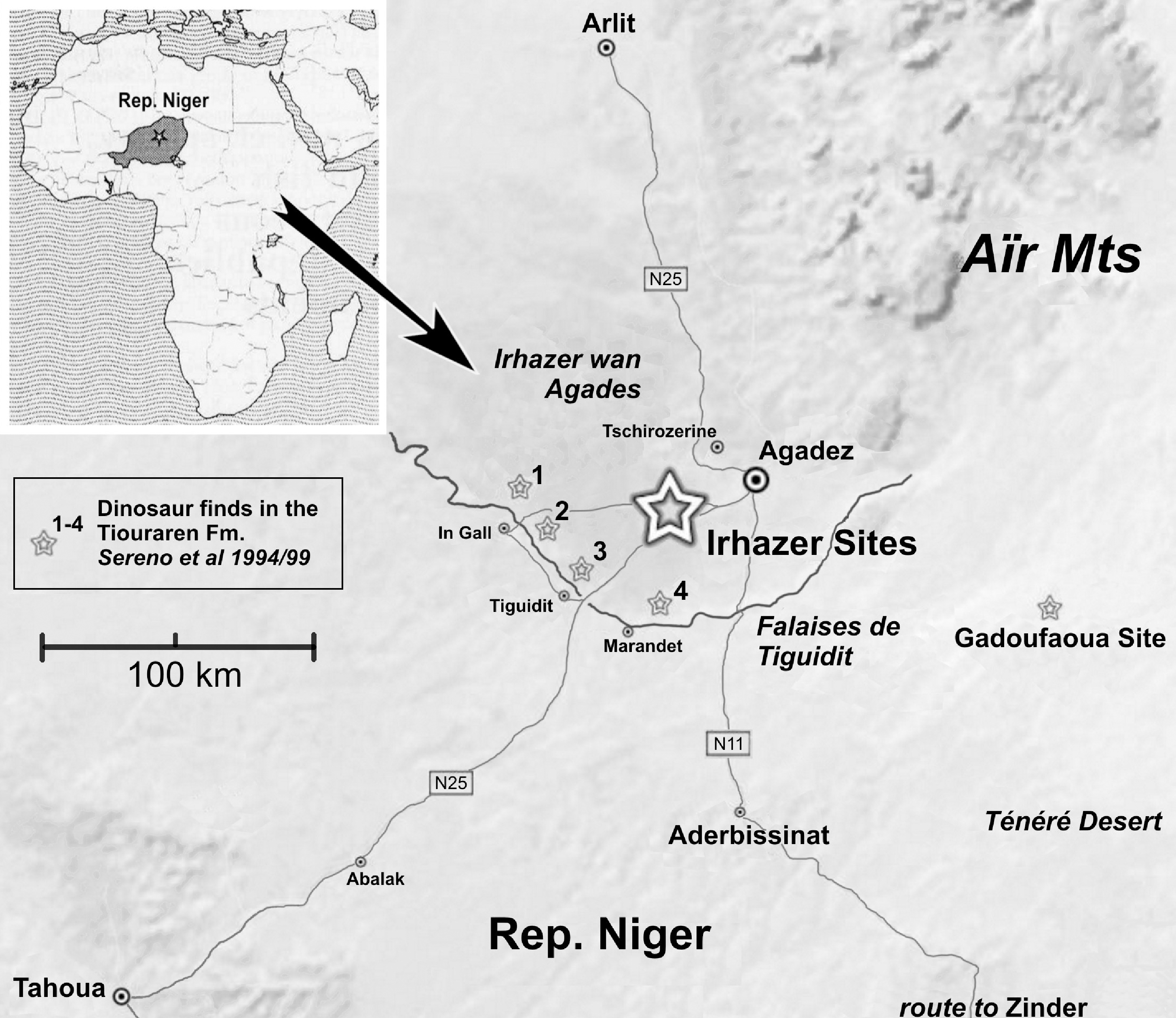
Map showing dinosaur localities around Agadez, Niger; the large star (middle) indicates the Irhazer Shale, where Spinophorosaurus was found.

The rich dinosaur fauna of Niger was brought to scientific attention through French and Italian excavations in the 1960s and 1970s. This led to the description of new genera from Lower Cretaceous rocks, most prominently the iguanodontian Ouranosaurus. An older succession of rocks, the Tiourarén Formation, was explored by American palaeontologist Paul Sereno, who conducted a large-scale excavation campaign in Niger between 1999 and 2003. Although initially thought to fall within the Lower Cretaceous, the formation is now thought to be of a much older Middle Jurassic age. Sereno named new dinosaurs such as the sauropod Jobaria and the theropod Afrovenator from the Tiourarén; most finds were discovered along a cliff known as the Falaise de Tiguidit in the southern Agadez Region. In Marendet, Sereno left partial Jobaria skeletons in the field as a tourist attraction. Starting in 2003, the PALDES project (Paleontología y Desarrollo – "Palaeontology and development") was conducting excavations in the southern Agadez Region. A cooperative effort between Spanish science and humanitarian institutions, PALDES aimed to combine palaeontological research with a developmental program for the region. This included the improvement of infrastructure, education structures, and the promotion of tourism, including the planned construction of a new palaeontological museum in Tadibene.

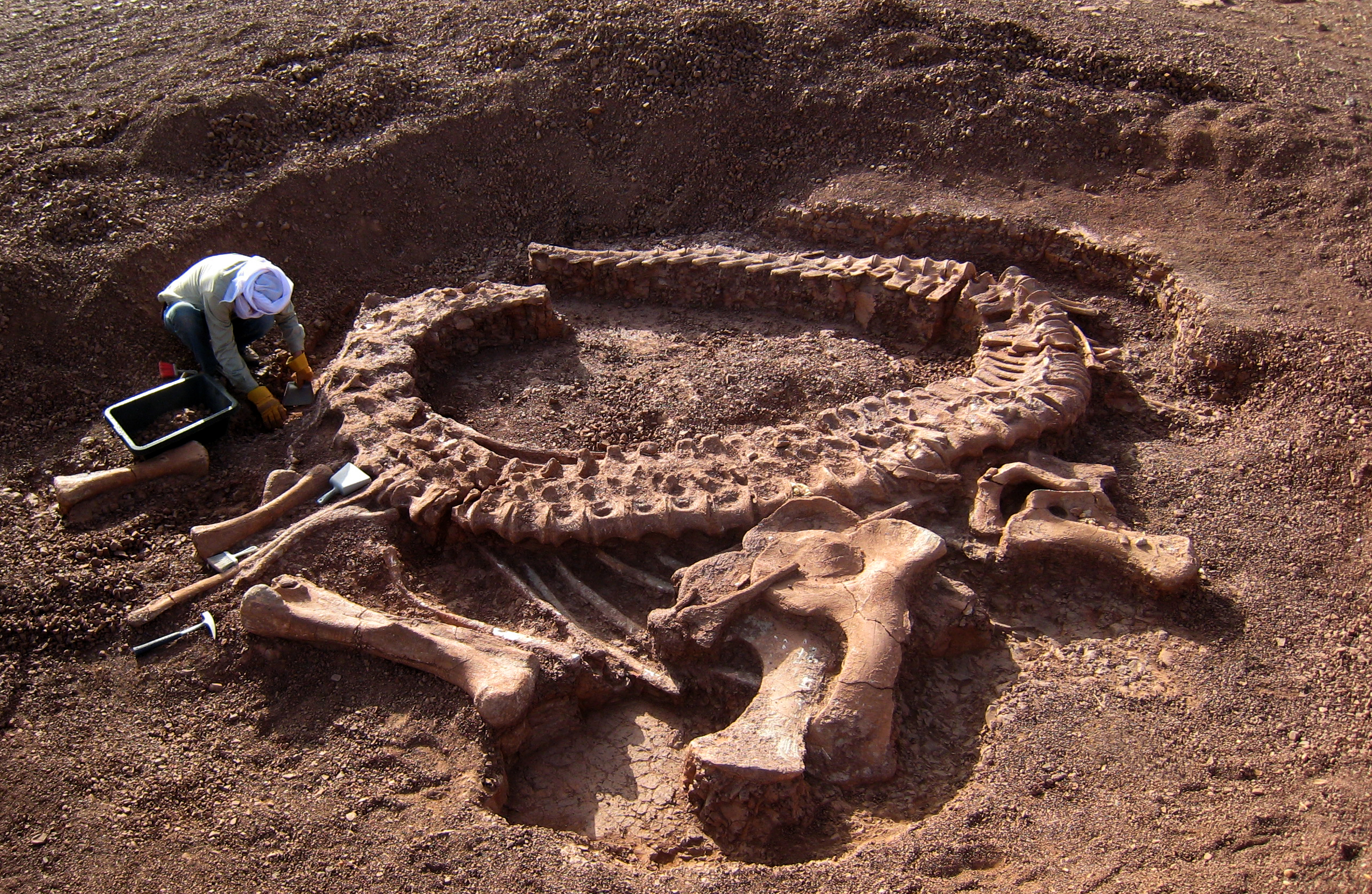
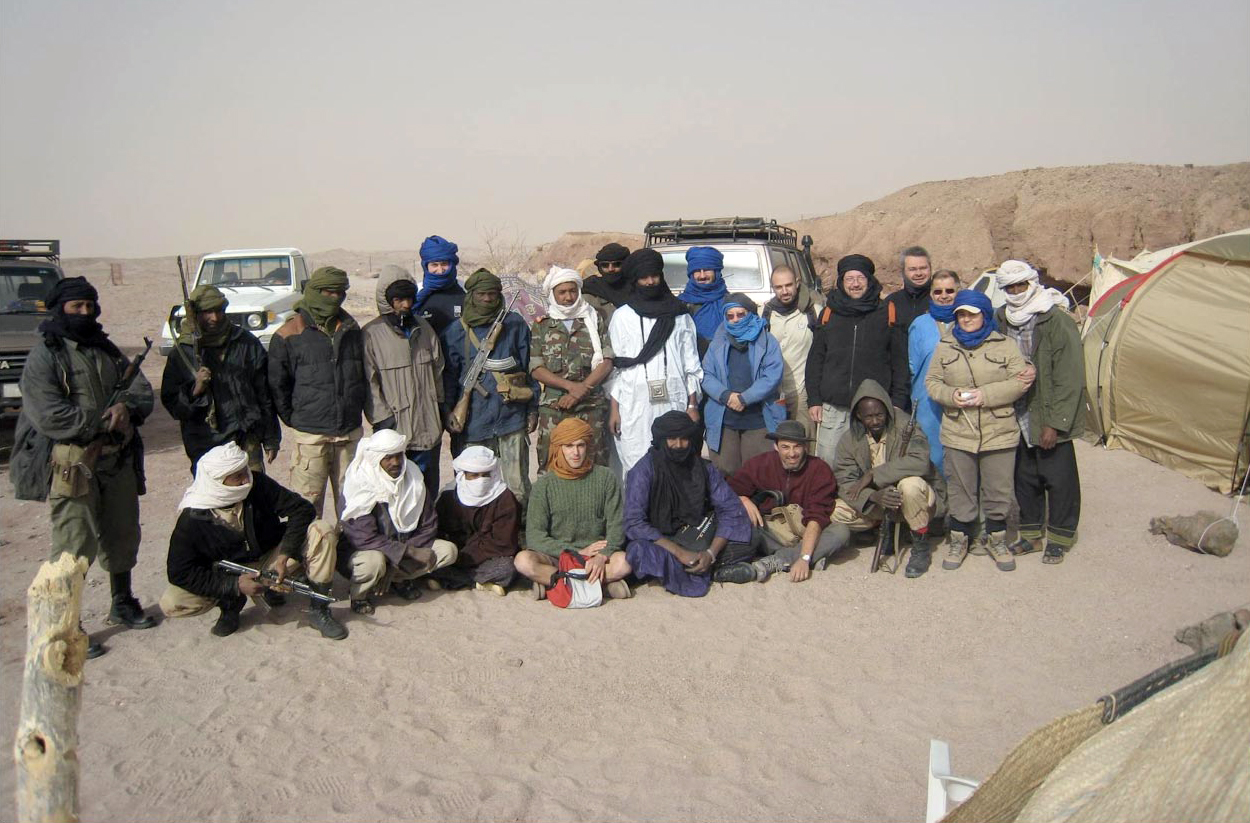
Holotype skeleton during excavation by the PALDES team in 2007 (above), and group photo of the team during that time

Early in 2005, German explorers Ulrich Joger and Edgar Sommer explored the semi-deserts south of Agadez after local Tuaregs had informed Sommer about the occurrence of large bones in the region. Sommer is the founder of CARGO, a relief organisation specialised in improving the local education system for the Tuareg people, while Joger is a biologist and the director of the State Natural History Museum, Braunschweig, Germany. On their return route, they chatted with a group of Tuaregs who then directed them to a hilly area nearby that was littered with small bone fragments. This locality (where dinosaurs had not been excavated before) is about 30 km (19 mi) north of the Falaise de Tiguidit and near the town of Aderbissinat in the Agadez Region, and part of the Irhazer Shale (or Argiles de l'Irhazer), a geological formation below (and thus slightly older than) the Tiourarén. After a one-hour search, Joger discovered a rounded bone tip sticking out of the surface, which after further excavation turned out to be a complete femur (thigh bone) of what would later become the holotype specimen of Spinophorosaurus. An associated scapula (shoulder blade) and a vertebra were discovered soon after. The sediment in the locality, a hard but brittle siltstone, could be removed from the bones using light hammer blows.

Joger and Sommer then hired local Tuaregs for support and, after two days, had uncovered most of the specimen, which included a virtually complete, articulated vertebral column and several limb and pelvic bones. The vertebral column formed an almost complete circle, the tip of the tail being located where the skull would be expected but was not found. Lacking equipment and an excavation permit, they covered the specimen with debris for protection and returned to Germany, now planning a full-scale scientific excavation to be carried out by the Braunschweig museum. An official excavation permit was promised to the museum in 2006 by the Republic of the Niger; in return, the museum was to build and equip a new school for local Tuareg children in the settlement of Injitane. In the autumn of 2006, Sommer and Joger, together with other associates of the Braunschweig museum, revisited the site in preparation for the excavation, putting one of the pelvic bones in plaster to test equipment and methodology. The team also discovered theropod tracks around 1 km (0.6 mi) from the site. Sponsors for financing both the school and excavation were found early in 2007. The official campaign, dubbed "Projekt Dino", started on 1 March 2007, when two trucks with equipment left Braunschweig for Niger, taking a route via Spain, Morocco, Mauritania, and Mali (the shorter route through the Sahara was not possible due to the risk of terrorist attacks). The other part of the team, which comprised ten permanent members, arrived by airplane. It was the first German dinosaur expedition to Africa in almost a century.

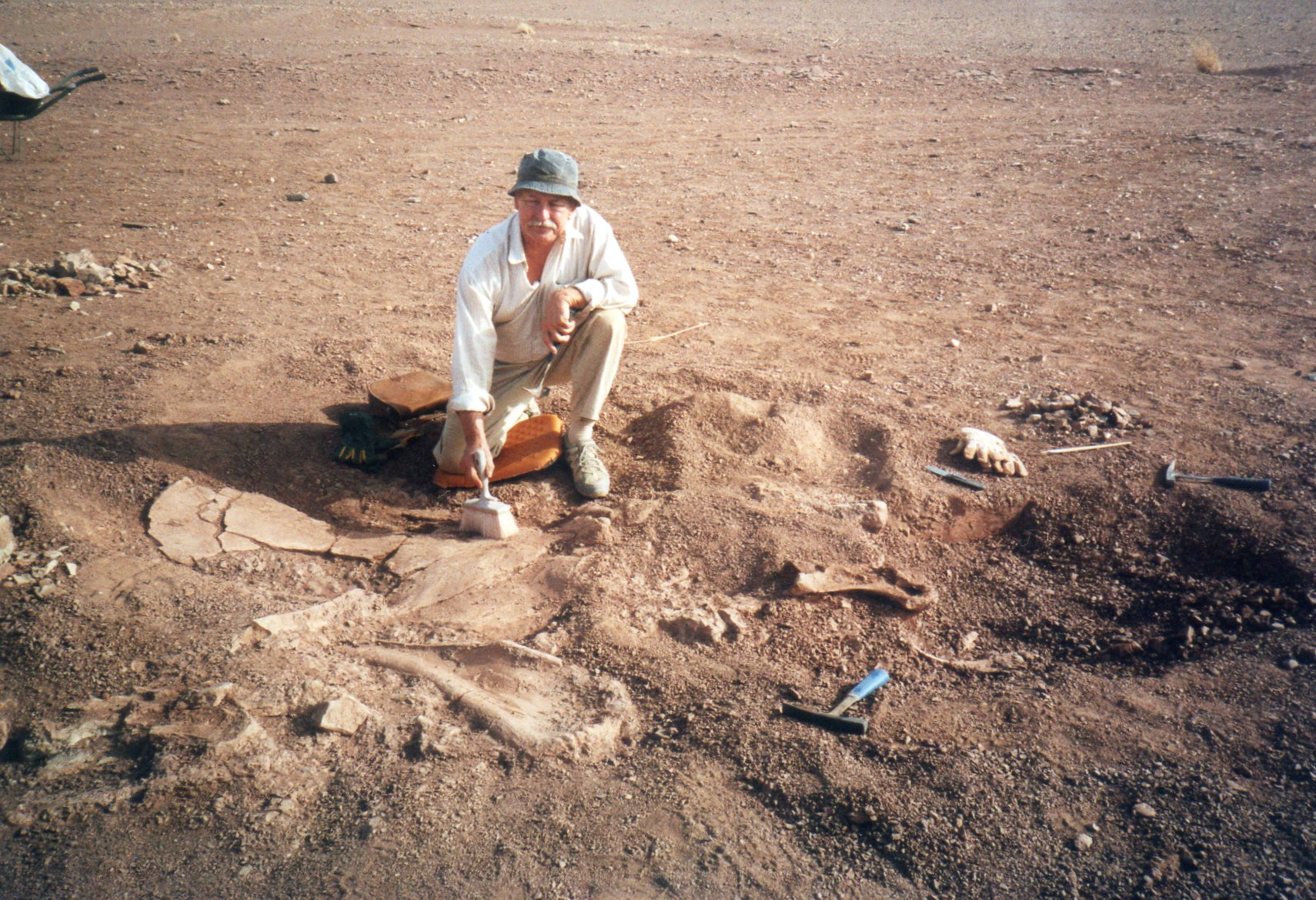
Paratype skeleton during excavation by the German team in 2007

In the meantime, the Spanish project PALDES team, led by the Palaeontological Museum of Elche, was working in the region. Early in 2007, Mohamed Echika, mayor of Aderbissinat, allowed the PALDES team to excavate the skeleton previously discovered by the Germans; the skeleton was subsequently shipped to Spain. Unaware of these activities, the vanguard of the German team found an empty dig site (showing signs of a professional excavation) upon their arrival on 16 March; the trucks arrived on 20 March. Although disappointed, the German team discovered a second Spinophorosaurus specimen, the future paratype, 15 m (49 ft) apart from the first, on 17 March. An exploratory trench within an area littered with small bone fragments soon revealed jaw and tooth fragments; on the next day, ribs, vertebrae, a humerus (upper arm bone) and a scapula could be identified. Eight local excavation helpers joined the group on 19 March. On 20 March, before the arrival of the trucks, the freshwater reserve of initially 200 L (53 US gal) was depleted as the local helpers had used it for washing the night before, causing members of the team to faint. Excavation was usually interrupted between 12:00 and 15:00 when temperatures reached 43–45 °C (109–113 °F). On 25 March, all but two of the German team members were ill, suffering diarrhoea and circulation problems. Throughout the excavation, progress was documented with photographs and field notes.

By 27 March, the humerus, scapula, and most ribs of the future paratype had already been wrapped in protective plaster and extracted. Although no further bones were apparent beneath the skeleton, the team removed an additional 60–80 cm (24–31 in) of sediment to make sure that all fossils had been collected. Excavation was completed on 2 April, and the fossils were packed for transport to the port of Cotonou on 3 April. On the same day, Echika revealed to the team that the first skeleton had been excavated by a Spanish group with his permission. He promised to lead the team to another fossil site located around 80 km (50 mi) south of Agadez at the cliff of Tiguidit as compensation. There the team found the rear part of a possible Jobaria skeleton, but was forced to leave the largest block in the field until the next season. To discourage others from collecting the block, an explosive dummy was fabricated and attached to the fossil, labeled with a warning in Spanish. The German team retrieved the block the next season in 2008; the PALDES team had canceled their excavation plans for that year following the outbreak of the Tuareg rebellion (2007–2009).

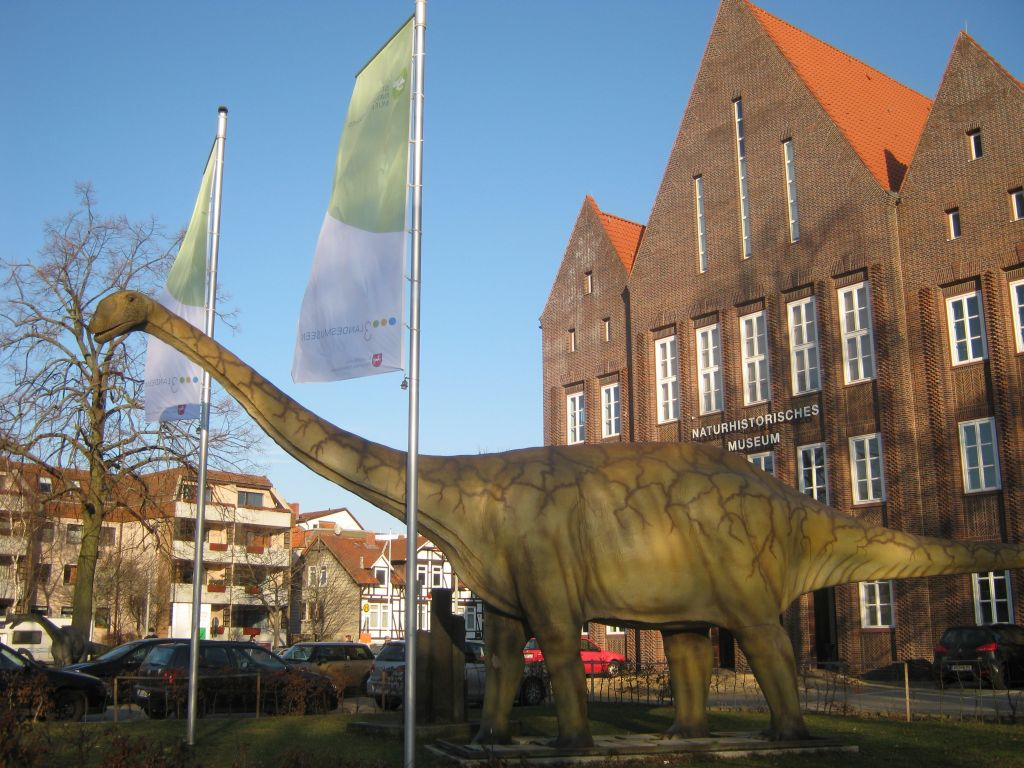
Spinophorosaurus model nicknamed "Namu", outside the Braunschweig Museum

The two Spinophorosaurus specimens were provisionally housed in the Spanish and German museums. By contract with the Republic of the Niger, they were to be returned to the country in the future, managed by the Musée National d'Histoire Naturelle in Niamey as well as by a smaller, newly built local museum. The future paratype specimen arrived in Germany on 18 March 2007; for its preparation, which took two and a half years, the Braunschweig museum rented a separate factory building. In parallel, a joint paper was prepared by the now cooperating German and Spanish teams. The German team digitised prepared bones and fragments of both specimens in 3D using laser scanning. As the skeleton in Braunschweig was only 70% complete, the specimen in Spain was used to fill in the missing pieces; during this process, it was discovered that the skeleton in Spain was the one the Germans had initially discovered and lost. The 3D scans were digitally repaired and undeformed, printed in 3D, and assembled into a mounted skeleton for the Braunschweig museum's exhibition (the first sauropod skeleton reproduced through 3D-printing). A life-sized model of a living Spinophorosaurus, nicknamed "Namu" (after the museum's name), was put up in front of the main entrance of the museum. The Spanish team produced separate 3D models from photographs of the holotype using photogrammetry (where photos are taken of an object from different angles to map them); a caudal vertebra was put on display at the Elche museum in 2018. In a 2018 conference abstract, García-Martínez and colleagues announced that they reconstructed the morphology of the second back vertebrae, which is poorly preserved, based on the better preserved first and fifth back vertebrae. This was done using landmark-based geometric morphometrics, where corresponding 3D-coordinates are collected from each vertebra and analysed statistically.

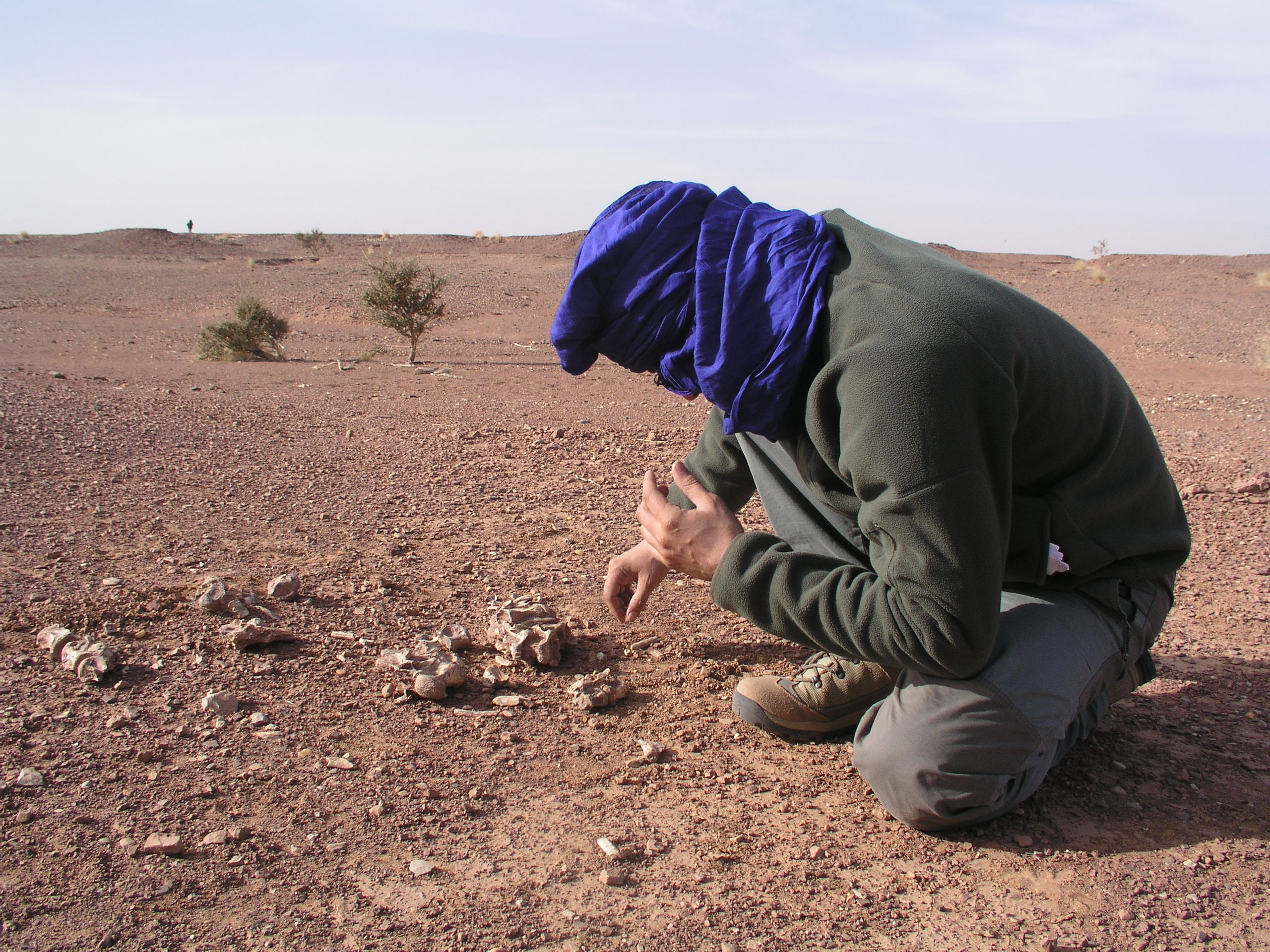
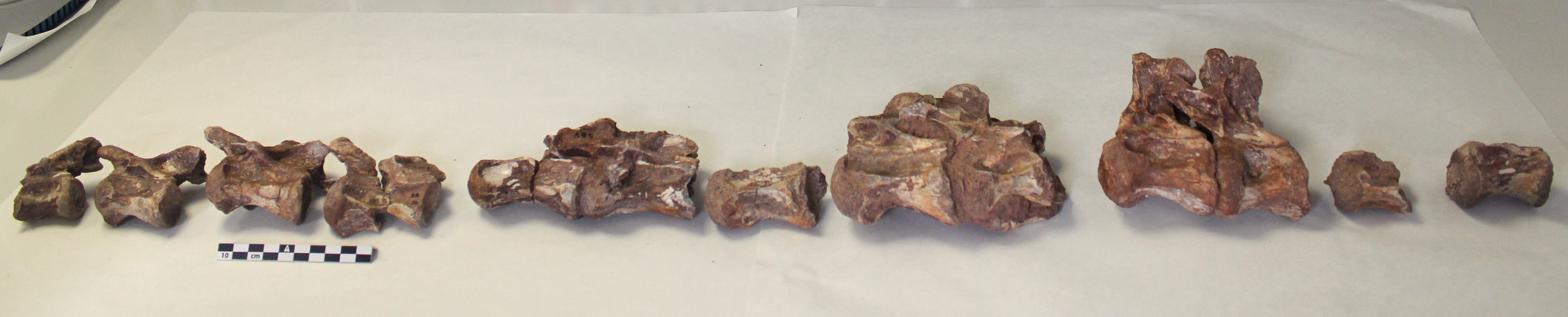
Vertebrae of a juvenile during excavation (above) and at the National University of Distance Education

The first skeleton (divided between the Elche museum, where it was catalogued as GCP-CV-4229, and the Braunschweig museum, catalogued as NMB-1699-R) was made the holotype of the new genus and species Spinophorosaurus nigerensis by German palaeontologist Kristian Remes and colleagues of the German and Spanish teams in 2009. The generic name is composed of spina, Latin for "spike"; phoro, Greek for "to bear"; and sauros, which means lizard ("spine-bearing lizard" in full): the name refers to what was initially interpreted as osteoderms bearing spikes, which were later suggested to represent clavicles instead. The specific name refers to Niger, where the taxon was discovered. The holotype specimen consists of a braincase, a postorbital bone, a squamosal, a quadrate, a pterygoid, a surangular, and a nearly complete postcranial skeleton, which lacks the sternum, antebrachium, manus, and pes. The second, paratype specimen (NMB-1698-R), consists of a partial skull and an incomplete postcranial skeleton. Elements preserved in this specimen but not the holotype include a premaxilla, maxilla, lacrimal, dentary, angular, the dorsal ribs of the right side, the humerus, and a pedal phalanx. The two specimens are considered to belong to the same taxon since the skeletal elements that overlapped between them were identical, and because of the proximity of the skeletons in the same stratigraphic layer. At the time it was described, Spinophorosaurus was the most completely known Middle Jurassic sauropod from North Africa, and by 2018 was considered to be one of the most complete early (non-neosauropod) sauropods.

In 2012, Adrián Páramo and Francisco Ortega from the PALDES team reported a small sauropod skeleton (specimen GCP-CV-BB-15) that had been discovered on the ground, a few metres from the two Spinophorosaurus specimens; all the fossils were probably from the same beds. The small skeleton consists of 14 vertebrae (some articulated), including all neck vertebrae as well as some back vertebrae. The centra of its vertebrae are 20% smaller than those of Spinophorosaurus and the neurocentral suture is open, indicating it is a juvenile. Several distinct features of the skeleton are shared with Spinophorosaurus, and though some features of that genus are not present, it most likely represents a juvenile Spinophorosaurus (the differences probably explained by ontogeny, changes during growth).

== Description ==
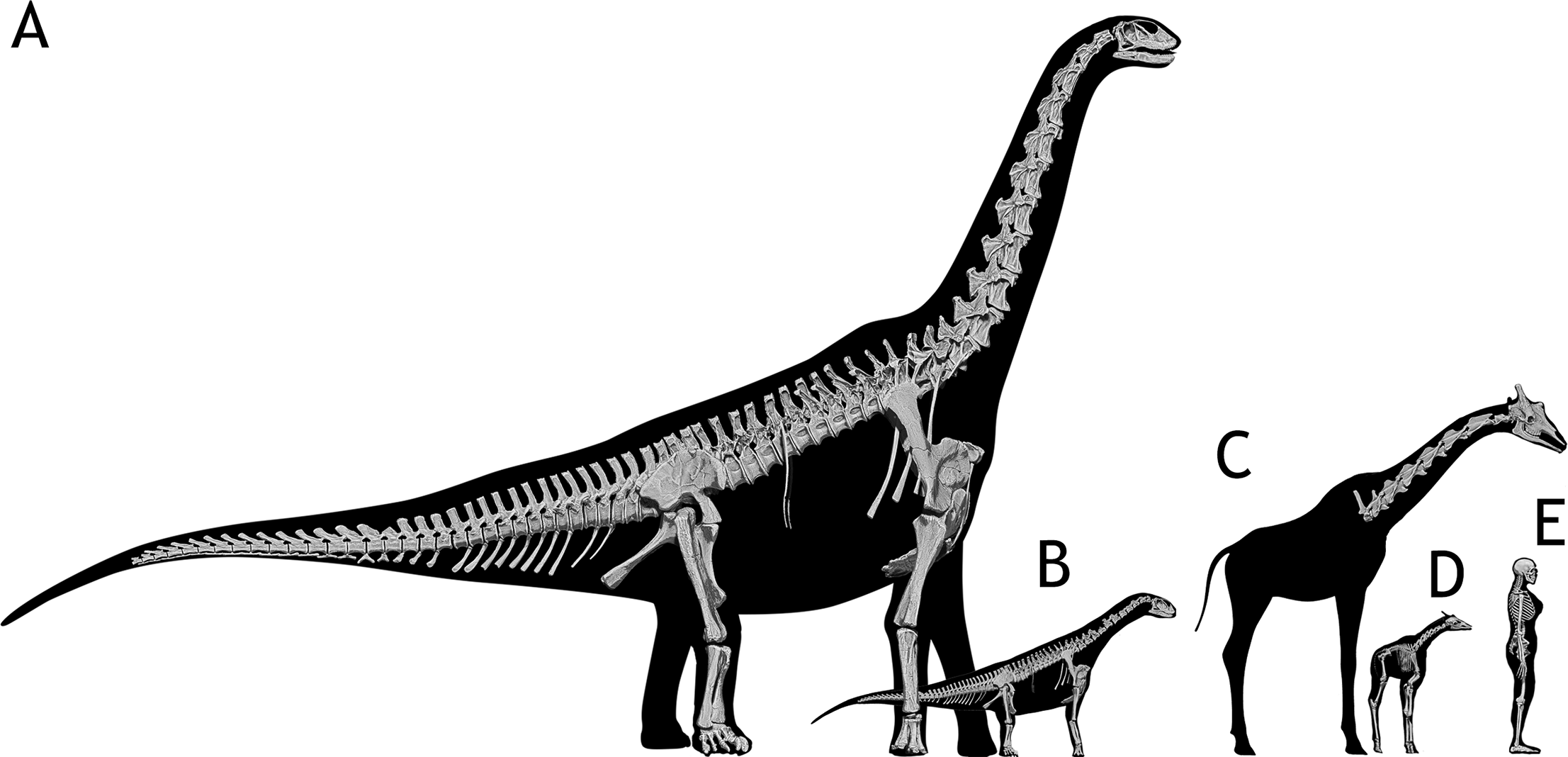
Reconstructed adult and juvenile Spinophorosaurus skeletons (A, B) compared in size with adult and juvenile giraffes (C, D) and a human (E)

The holotype specimen was initially estimated to have been around 13 metres (43 ft) in length when measured along the vertebral column, while the paratype was about 13 per cent larger, measuring around 14 m (46 ft). The holotype specimen's endocranial and neurocentral sutures in the skull and vertebrae respectively are unfused, indicating it was a subadult, whereas the paratype specimen has fully fused neurocentral sutures. A later 3D photogrammetry model of the holotype skeleton measures 11.7 m (38 ft) from head to tail, the proportions differing from estimates based on 2D skeletal reconstructions. In 2023, Vidal listed the holotype as 11 metres (36 ft) long, the paratype as 13 metres (43 ft), and the juvenile as 3 metres (9.8 ft). The shoulder height reached by these individuals was estimated at around 4 m (13 ft), and the weight at about 7 metric tons (7.7 short tons).

In 2020, Vidal and colleagues revised the posture of Spinophorosaurus, based on the mounting of the digital skeleton. While the original 2009 skeletal reconstruction showed the dinosaur with a horizontal posture, the digital reconstruction showed a more vertical posture, with tall shoulders and an elevated neck. One of the features pointed out by these researchers that would have made the pose of this dinosaur more vertical was that the vertebrae of the sacrum and the hindmost back vertebrae were wedged, causing the vertebral column to be deflected upwards toward the front of the sacrum at an angle of 10°. Additional features that made the posture more vertical were the elongated scapulae and humeri, as well as elongated prezygapophyseal facets on the neck vertebrae and a specialised first back vertebra. Consequently, the snout of Spinophorosaurus would have been held about 5 metres (16 ft) above the ground, more than twice the height of the shoulders and acetabulum where the hindlimb attached to the pelvis, which were at a height of 2.15 metres (7.1 ft).

=== Skull ===
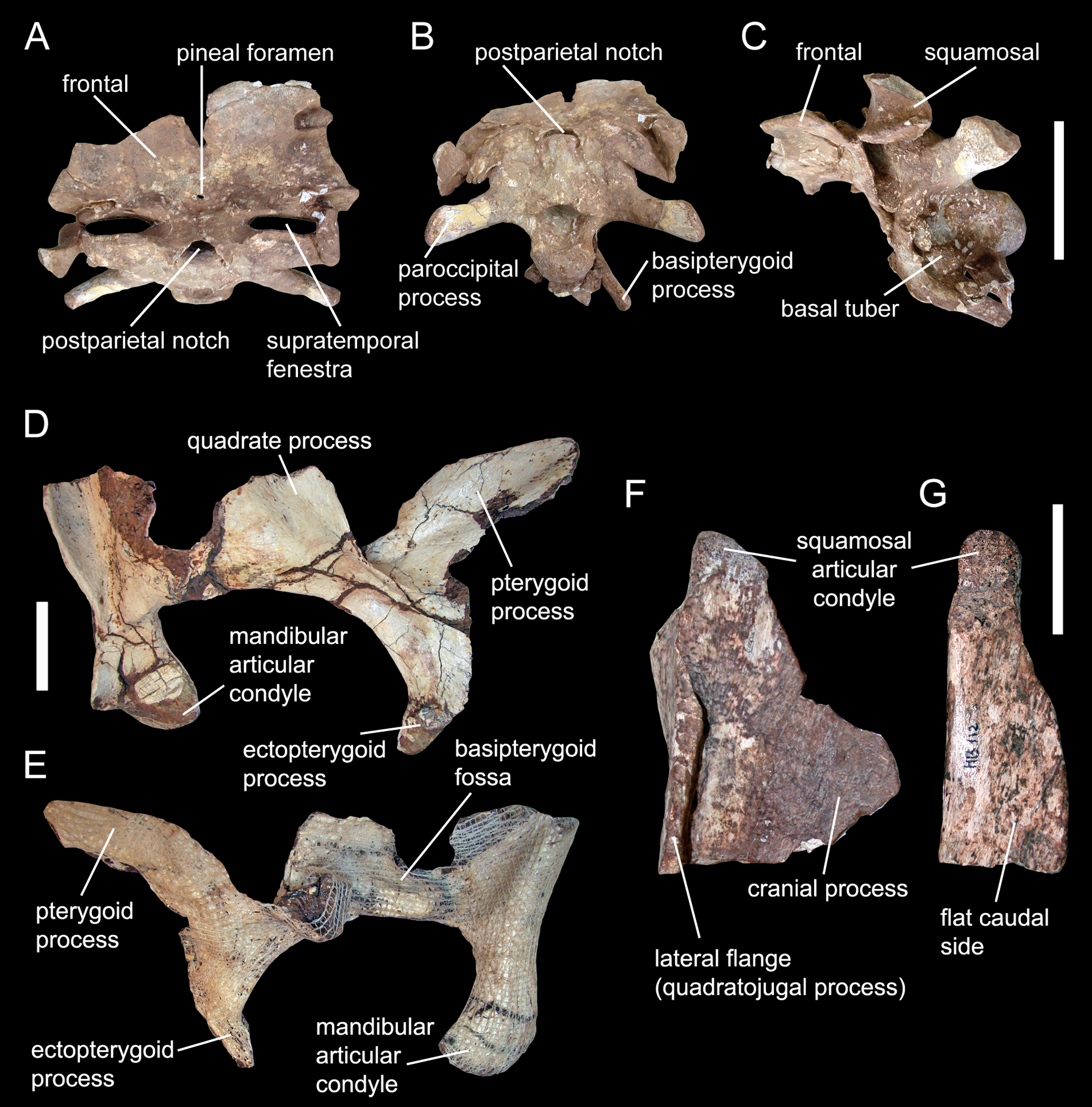
Skull elements of the holotype: braincase (A–C), right quadrate and pterygoid bones (D, E), and upper end of the right quadrate (F, G)

The frontal bones of the skull roof were fused in the midline, unlike the other sutures of the skull. Between the frontals was a small pineal foramen, about 10 mm (0.4 in) in front of the suture between the frontal and the parietal bones. The rear margin of the skull had an open postparietal notch, a feature otherwise only known in dicraeosaurids and Abrosaurus. A notch following the midline at the front of the conjoined frontal bones indicates there might have been a prong extending from each nasal bone to between the frontals, as may have been the case for Nigersaurus but is unusual among sauropods in general. The upper temporal fenestrae, a pair of major openings on the skull roof, were four times broader than long; such broadened fenestrae were typical for Shunosaurus and more derived (or "advanced") sauropods. The occipital condyle at the back of the skull was concave on the sides, like in Shunosaurus. The basal tubera (a pair of extensions on the underside of the skull base that served as muscle attachments) were enlarged and were directed to the sides, unique among known sauropods. The quadrate did not have a concavity on the hind-side, an ancestral condition otherwise only known in Tazoudasaurus among sauropods. The spatulate (spoon shaped) teeth were unique in possessing enlarged, spaced denticles around the top of the crown, with a higher count of denticles on the front edge of the crown.

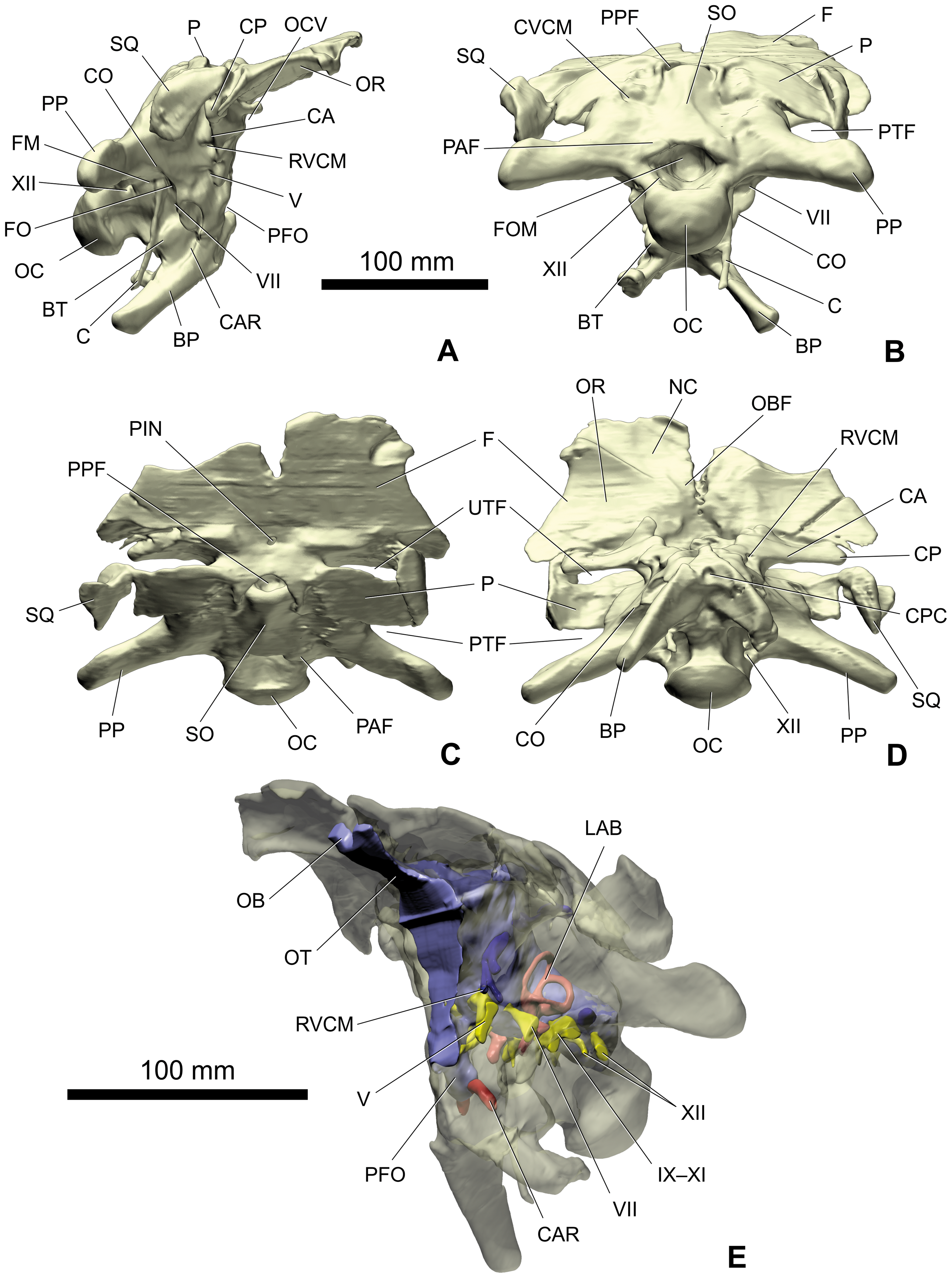
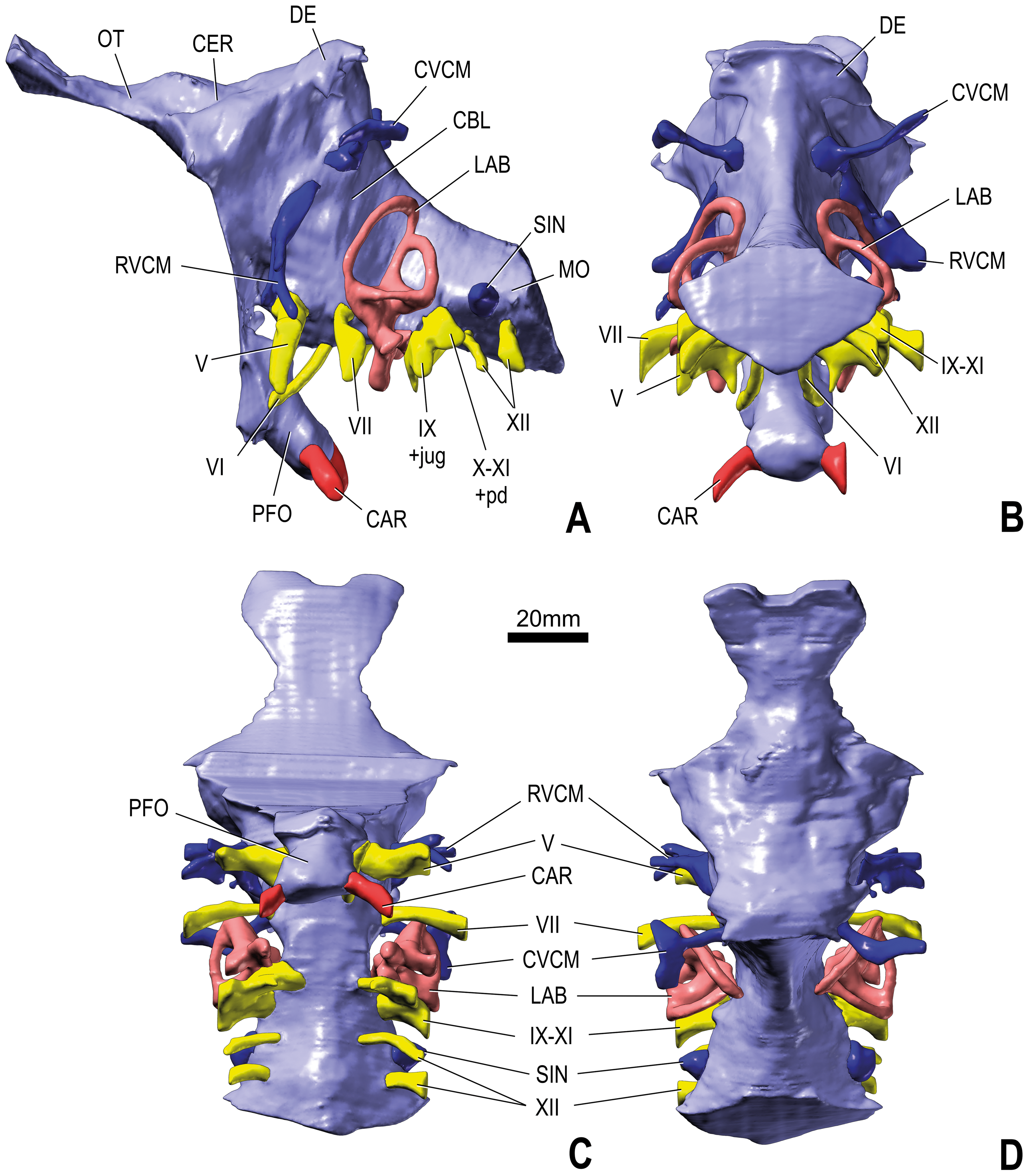
CT scans of the holotype braincase, with endocast of the brain and inner ear; the neuroanatomy was in some ways intermediate between that of basal sauropodomorphs and the more derived neosauropods.

The braincase of Spinophorosaurus was broad and short from front to back, moderately deep, and of relatively large size overall. It differed significantly from those of other Jurassic sauropods, possibly except Atlasaurus. They shared a basipterygoid process on their basisphenoids that were similar in being directed strongly backwards. A CT endocast of the holotype's brain cavity showed it was similar to most sauropods in having pontine and cerebral flexures that were well marked, a pituitary fossa that was large and oblong, and in that the structure of the brain was obscured by spaces that housed relatively thick meninges as well as by dural venous sinuses. The labyrinth of the inner ear was characteristic in having long and slender semicircular canals, similar to those of Massospondylus and Giraffatitan. Its neuroanatomy was in some ways intermediate between that of basal (or "primitive") sauropodomorphs and the more derived neosauropods.

=== Vertebrae and ribs ===
The vertebral column is almost completely known, and the holotype is one of the few sauropod specimens that include a complete neck. The neck was composed of 13 cervical vertebrae. The trunk had 12 dorsal and four sacral vertebrae. The tail comprised more than 37 caudal vertebrae. Complex elements, individual vertebrae are composed of a lower part, the centrum, and an upper part, the neural arch. Important landmarks of the neural arch include the upwards projecting neural spine (spinous process) and the sideward projecting diapophyses, which together give the vertebra a T-shape in front and rear views. Pairs of articular processes connecting with neighboring vertebrae are protruding from the front (prezygapophyses) and rear (postzygapophyses).

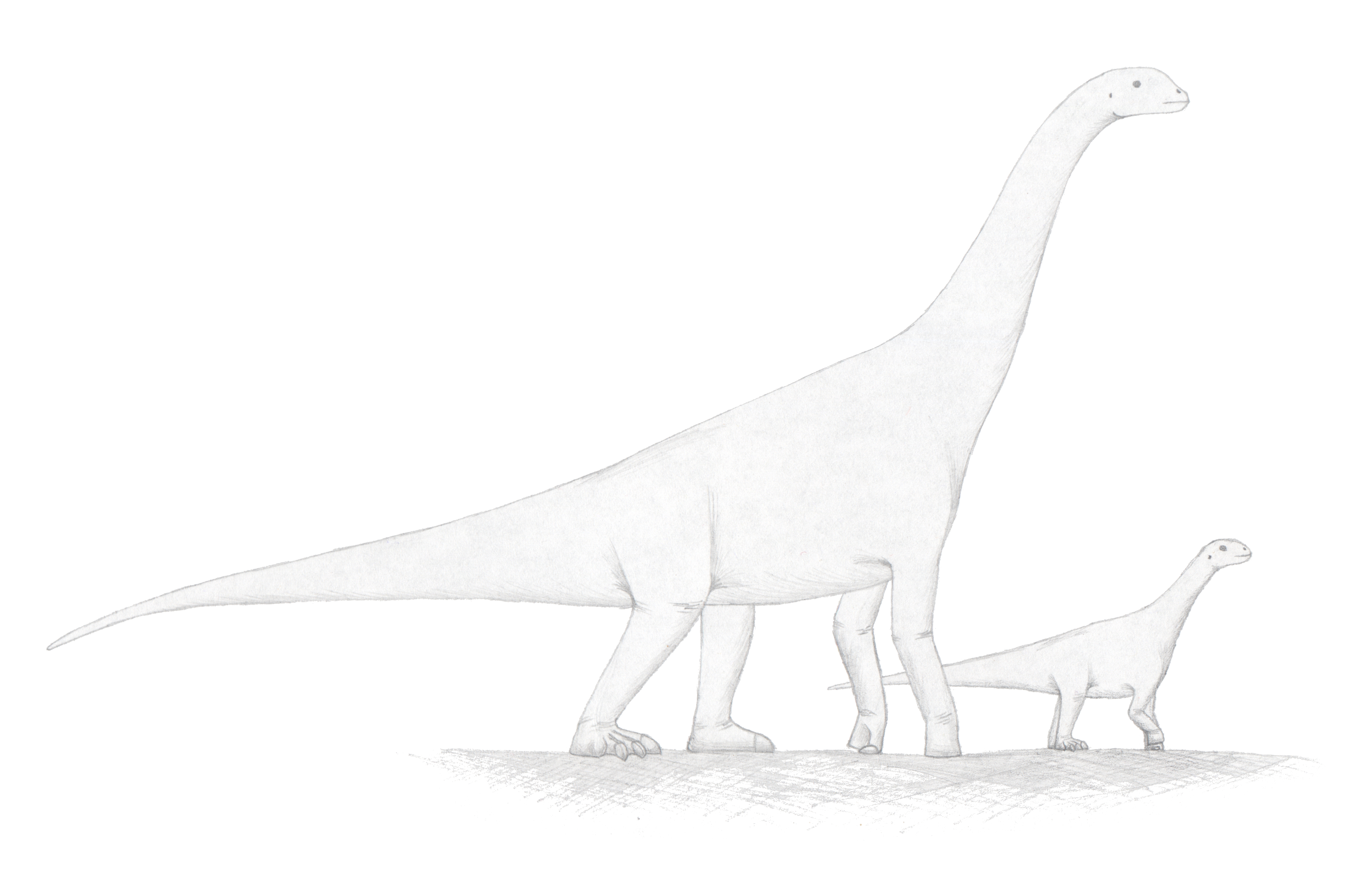
Life restoration of an adult and juvenile

The cervical vertebrae were similar to those of Jobaria and Cetiosaurus. Their centra were approximately 3.1 times as long as wide; they were therefore moderately elongated compared to sauropods in general, but generally longer than in other basal forms. The cervical centra had large excavations on their sides that deepened towards the front; such pleurocoels were also developed in Jobaria and Patagosaurus. Unlike in Jobaria, the pleurocoels were not subdivided by an oblique bony ridge. A midline keel was present on the underside of the front end of the centrum, which was absent in Cetiosaurus. The tips of the prezygapophyses had a triangular extension which is also seen in Jobaria, although it is deeper in that genus. Above the postzygapophyses were comparatively large epipophyses, bony projections for muscle attachment. The cervical vertebrae were different from those of basal sauropods from South America and India. The diapophyses (sideward facing processes of the neural arch) were inclined to face slightly downwards and had triangular flanges on their rear margins—features unseen in those southern forms. Furthermore, the neural spines were rugose (wrinkled) on their rear and front surfaces and close to the base of the neck, broader in side view and less high. In side view, a U-shaped depression was present between the centrum and the neural arch, which is an autapomorphy (unique feature) of Spinophorosaurus.

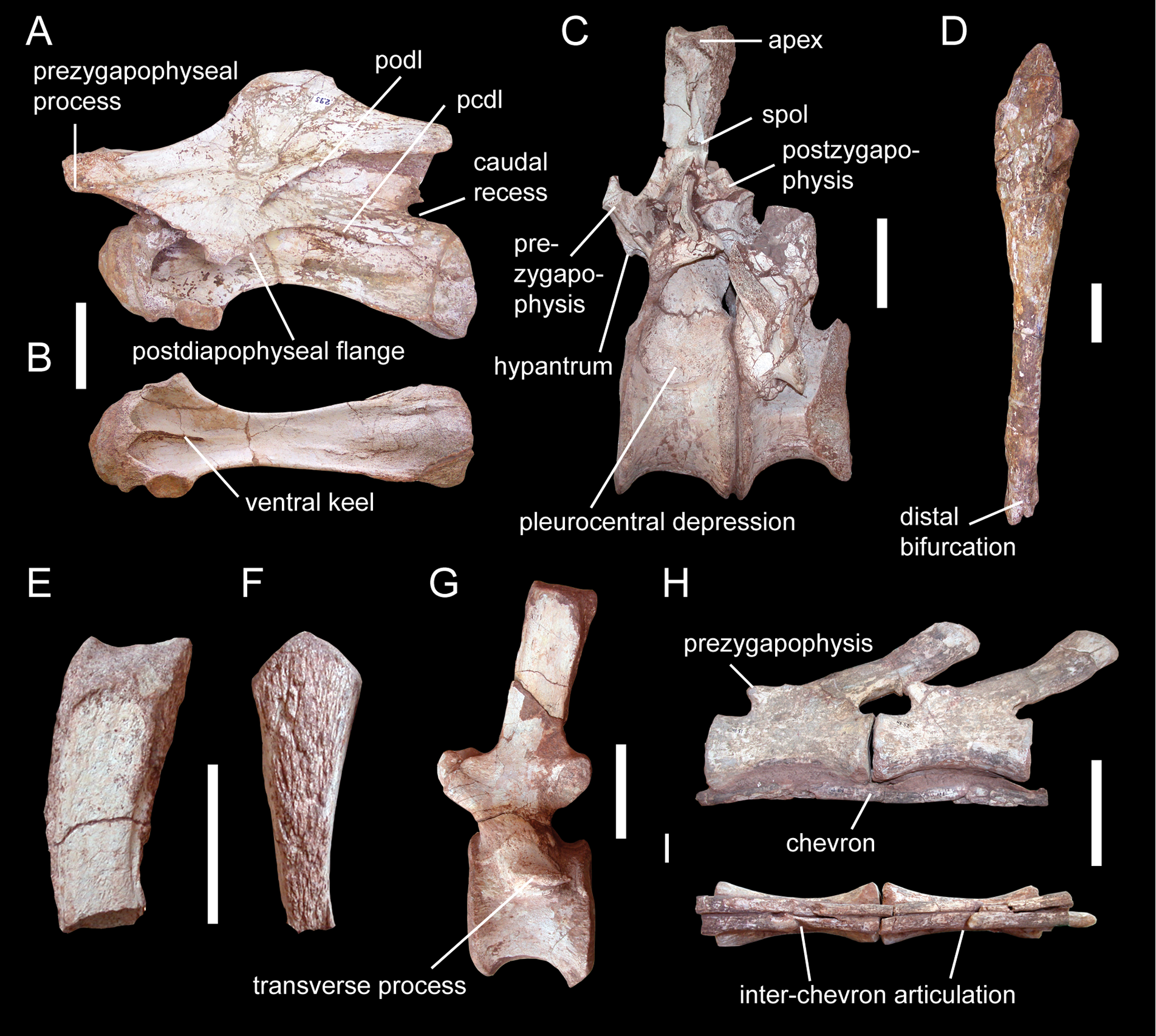
Vertebrae and clavicle (D)

The dorsal vertebrae were unusual in having a camellate internal structure (containing multiple small air-filled chambers). This feature is otherwise known in the much later titanosauriforms as well as in mamenchisaurids, where it evolved independently from the former group. Although the front dorsal vertebrae showed deep pleurocoels in their centra, these openings became much shallower towards the rear of the trunk. The rearmost dorsal vertebrae were also proportionally short. In Amygdalodon and Patagosaurus, in contrast, the rearwards dorsals were more elongated and had pronounced pleurocoels. The neural canal of the dorsal vertebrae was very narrow but high. Hyposphene-hypantrum articulations (accessory articular processes) were present in all dorsals, making the spine more rigid. The neural spines had marked rugosities on their front and back sides, as in other basal sauropods. The frontmost caudal vertebrae had the same rugosities on the neural spines as seen in the dorsals, a feature otherwise only known in Omeisaurus. In the hind part of the tail, the neural spines were strongly inclined backwards and extended over the front part of the succeeding vertebra, similar to some East Asian sauropods, Barapasaurus, and Jobaria.

The ribs of the second to fifth dorsal vertebrae were flattened and backwards directed, while those of the sixth to eleventh dorsal were more circular in cross-section and more vertically oriented. The ribcage can therefore be clearly subdivided into a pectoral and a lumbar section; such a differentiation has only been described in a single other sauropod, the dicraeosaurid Brachytrachelopan. Furthermore, the ends of the pectoral ribs had attachment sites for the sternal ribs, which connected to the sternum. In the front part of the tail, the chevrons (paired bones below the vertebral centra) were blade-like, which is the basal condition. In the rear part of the tail, the chevrons were rod-like, and the left and right counterparts separated from each other. These rod-like chevrons would have been closely attached to the bottom edges of the centra. They articulated with the preceding and succeeding chevrons at the mid length of the vertebral centra, thus bracing the vertebral joint, restricting bending of the tail.

=== Girdles, limbs, and misidentified tail spikes ===
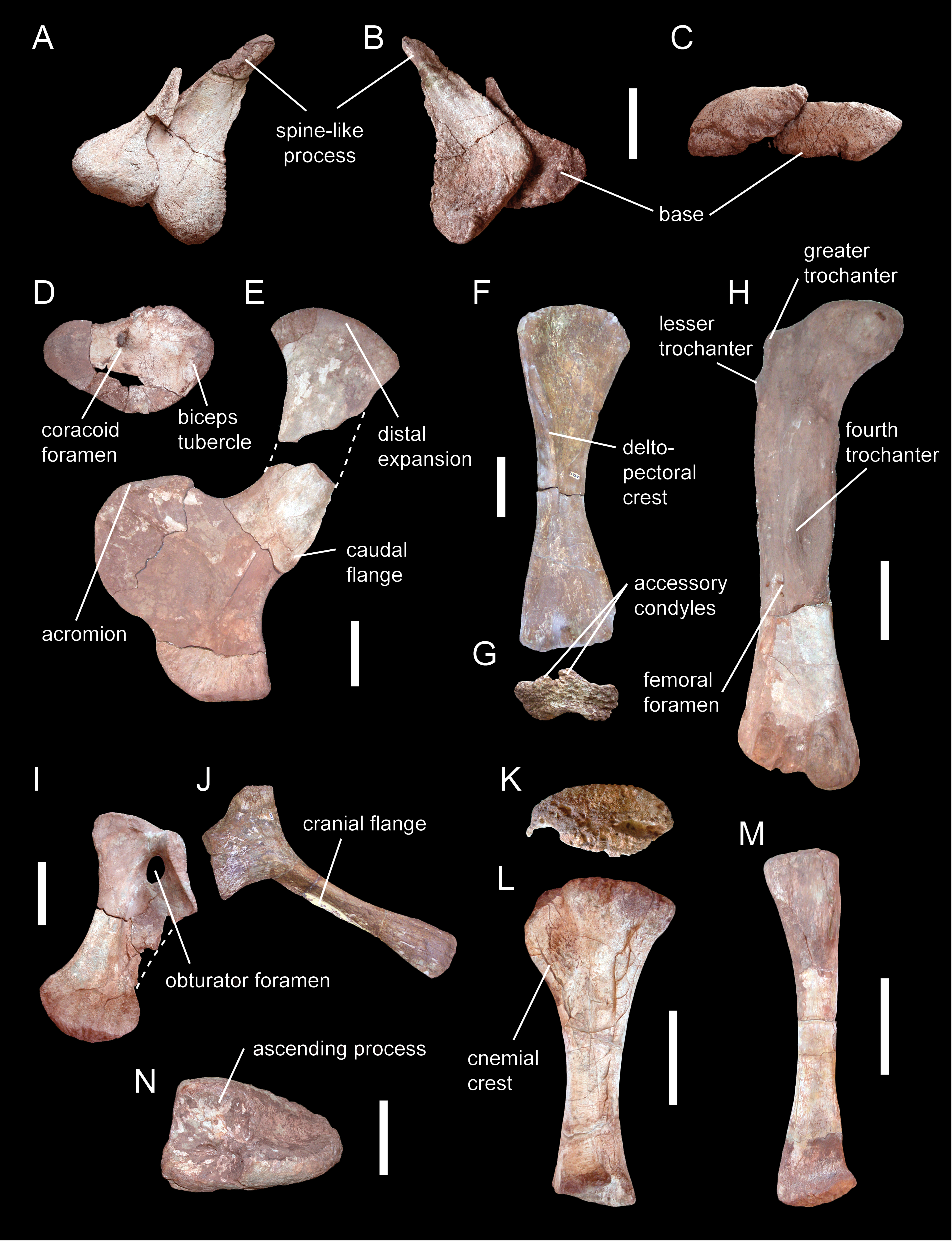
Probable clavicle initially interpreted as spike-like osteoderms (A–C), girdle, and limb elements

The scapula was unique amongst sauropods, being strongly curved with an expanded, fan-shaped lower end. It was D-shaped in cross-section, a feature characteristic for eusauropods. Its upper end was broadened and featured a bony flange on the lower margin. In these respects it was similar to mamenchisaurids from Asia but different from the genera Vulcanodon, Barapasaurus, and Patagosaurus from Gondwana (the southern supercontinent of the time), in which the upper end was only weakly broadened, and the rear flange lacking. The coracoid, which articulated to the lower end of the scapula, showed a distinct kidney-shape, considered an autapomorphy. It had a large biceps tubercle to which the biceps brachii muscle attached. The clavicle was robust, although more slender than in Jobaria. Of the forelimb only the humerus is preserved. Its lower end was asymmetrical and had enlarged accessory condyles (forward directed projections on the lower front margin of the bone)—features otherwise only seen in mamenchisaurids. The pubis and ischium of the pelvis were robust, the latter being broadened at its end. The upper femur (thigh bone) was characterised by the presence of a lesser trochanter on its upper end—a bony projection serving as attachment site for muscles that drew the hind leg forwards and inwards. The fourth trochanter, which projected from the back surface and anchored muscles that drew the hind leg backwards, was especially large in Spinophorosaurus. Close to the fourth trochanter was a large opening that is absent in other sauropods, and thus an autapomorphy. The tibia (shinbone) was similar to that of other basal sauropods, and the fibula (calf bone) was robust. Of the ankle, the upper side of the astragalus had facets for articulation with the tibia and fibula that were not separated by a bony wall, and as many as eight nutrient foramina (openings that allow blood vessels to enter the bone).

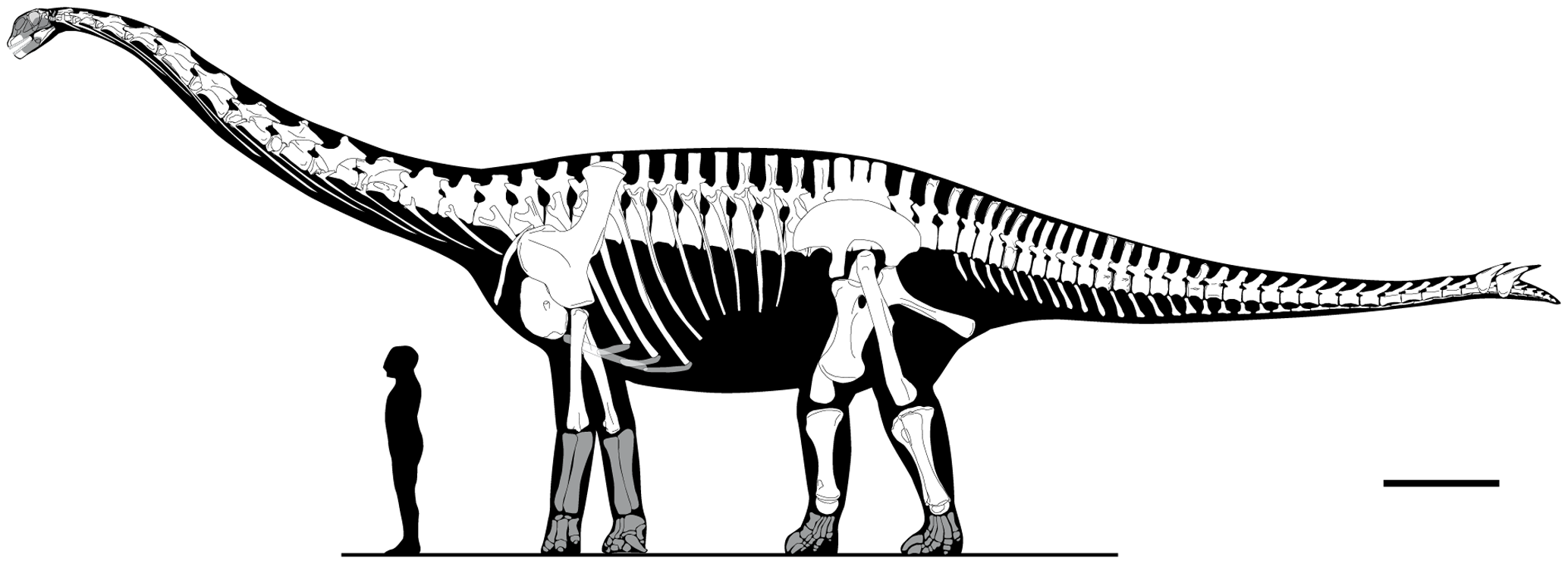
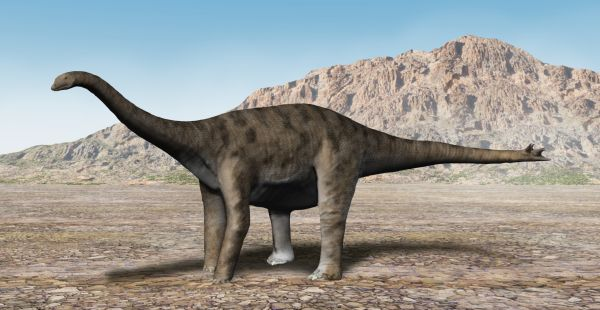
Skeletal reconstruction from the original 2009 description (above) showing tail spikes that may represent clavicles, as well as a too horizontal posture, and outdated life restoration (below) showing those same features

Elements originally interpreted as a left and right osteoderm (bone formed in the skin) were found with the holotype skeleton. These bones had a roundish base from which a spike-like projection protruded; the inner surfaces were rugose and concave. Although found within the pelvic region, Remes and colleagues thought they were situated on the tip of the tail in the living animal, which they considered a distinguishing feature of the genus. This position was based on the fact that the left and right elements were found closely together, suggesting they came from near the midline of the body. Furthermore, the stiffening of the hind part of the tail by elongated chevrons is also observed in other dinosaurs showing tail clubs or spikes. Similar spines were part of a tail club in the related sauropod Shunosaurus; such a tail club was likely not present in Spinophorosaurus, as the hindmost caudal vertebrae became too small. The right supposed osteoderm was somewhat larger than the left and slightly different in shape. This indicates they did not form a pair; in which case they would probably be simply the mirror-inverted counterpart of one another. Rather, these differences indicated two pairs of spines were present originally.

In 2013, palaeontologists Emanuel Tschopp and Octávio Mateus reexamined the supposed tail spikes and found they did not have the typical rugose surface of osteoderms seen in other armoured dinosaurs, or the club-like expansion seen in Shunosaurus. Due to their broken edges, They also doubted whether these elements were of different sizes as originally proposed. As these elements were found under the scapula, they instead proposed they represented clavicles, and that the fossils should be reassessed in this regard. Vidal and colleagues concurred with this suggestion in 2015 and 2018, and Vidal also followed this interpretation in his 2019 PhD thesis.

== Classification ==
The initial phylogenetic analysis presented by Remes and colleagues suggested Spinophorosaurus fell among the most basal sauropods known, being only slightly more derived than Vulcanodon, Cetiosaurus, and Tazoudasaurus. In this position, it would form the sister taxon of Eusauropoda, a clade comprising all more derived sauropods. The authors conceded that support for this very basal position was weak, and discussed several alternative placements within eusauropods that would explain anatomical similarities with other sauropods from northern Africa and Laurasia (the northern supercontinent). A similarly basal position outside of Eusauropoda was suggested by several subsequent studies, which placed Spinophorosaurus as the sister taxon of Tazoudasaurus or Volkheimeria. In a 2013 conference abstract, palaeontologist Pedro Mocho and colleagues re-evaluated the phylogenetic relationships of the genus by incorporating further information from newly prepared bones, arguing that Spinophorosaurus was nested within eusauropods. According to this analysis, the genus was more derived than Shunosaurus and Barapasaurus and close to Patagosaurus and mamenchisaurids. A much more derived systematic position within Eusauropoda was also proposed by a 2015 study, which found Spinophorosaurus to be the sister taxon of Nebulasaurus.

Cladogram based on Nair and Salisbury, 2012, which supports a basal position of Spinophorosaurus:

- Gravisauria
  - Vulcanodon
  - - - Tazoudasaurus
      - Spinophorosaurus
    - - Barapasaurus
      - - Rhoetosaurus
        - Eusauropoda
          - Shunosaurus
          - - Patagosaurus
            - - Omeisaurus
              - - Mamenchisaurus
                - Turiasauria
                  Losillasaurus
                - Neosauropoda

Cladogram based on Xing and colleagues, 2015, which supports a more derived position within Eusauropoda:

- Sauropoda
  - Vulcanodon
  - Eusauropoda
    - Shunosaurus
    - - Mamenchisauridae
      - - Barapasaurus
        - - - Nebulasaurus
            - Spinophorosaurus
          - - Patagosaurus
            - - Turiasauria
              - - Haplocanthosaurus
                - Neosauropoda

A 2022 study by palaeontologist Xin-Xin Ren and colleagues found Spinophorosaurus to be the basalmost mamenchisaurid, sharing eight derived features with this group. These researchers also found other non-Asian taxa (Rhoetosaurus from Australia and Wamweracaudia from Africa) to be mamenchisaurids, and concluded that the group was more widespread than previously thought. While they could not determine where the group originated, they stated it must have been widespread across Asia and Africa during the late Early to Middle Jurassic, before Laurasia and Gondwana disconnected during the late Middle to Late Jurassic.

=== Evolution ===
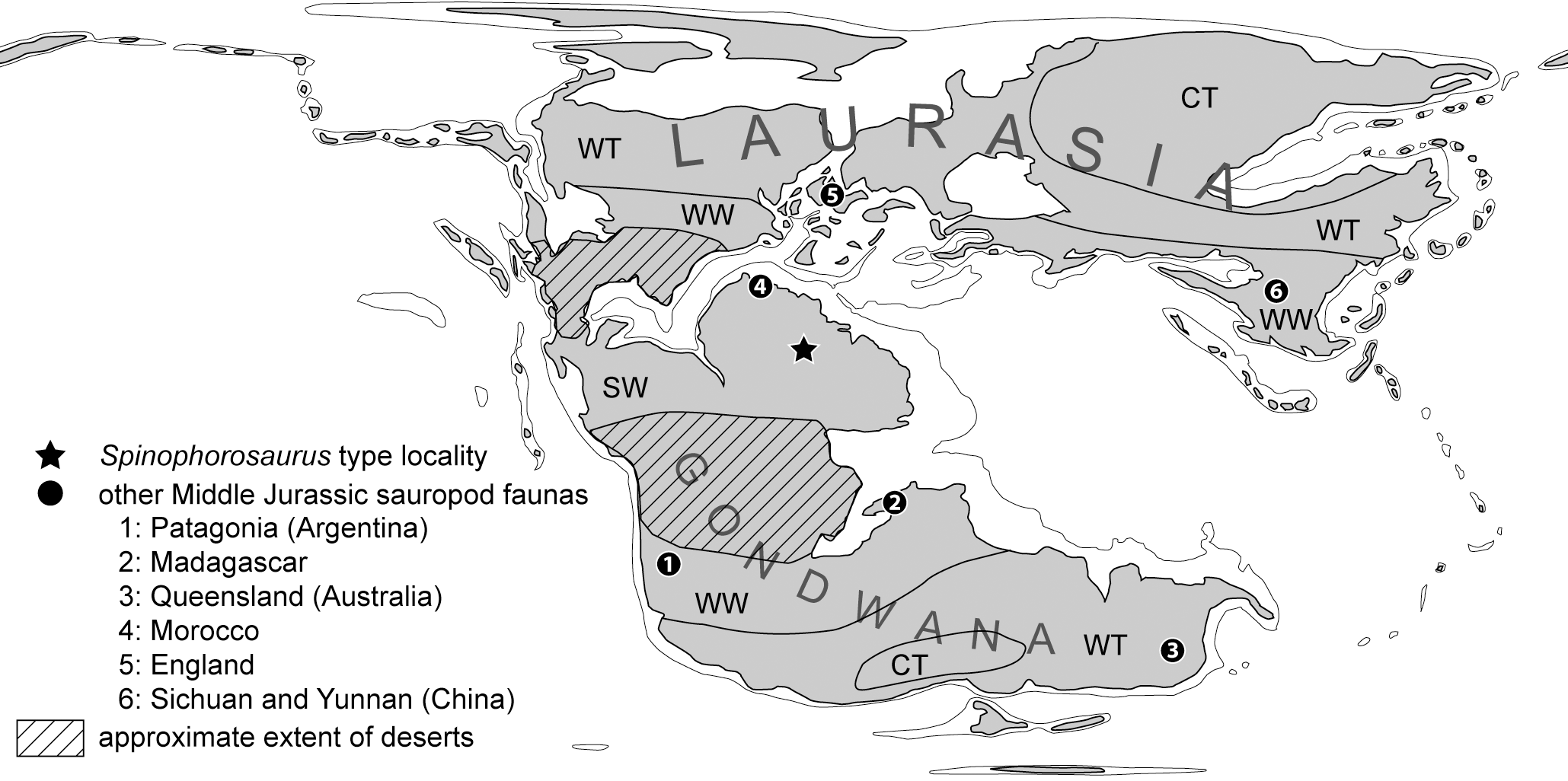
Congruence between Middle Jurassic sauropod distribution and palaeoclimatic zones; ★ (middle) is the Spinophorosaurus type locality

As one of the most completely known basal sauropods, Spinophorosaurus has helped to shed light on the early evolution and palaeobiogeography of the group. This has been unclear due to a sparsity of Early and Middle Jurassic remains, particularly outside Asia. Remes and colleagues found that Spinophorosaurus shares features with Middle Jurassic East Asian sauropods (especially in the neck and tail vertebrae, scapula and humerus) but is very dissimilar from Lower and Middle Jurassic South American and Indian taxa (differences include the shape and development of vertebra features and shape of the scapula and humerus). They suggested this could be explained by the Middle Jurassic sauropod faunas of Laurasia and South Gondwana having been separated by geographic barriers. Earlier it was believed that sauropods were distributed across the supercontinent Pangaea (which was composed of Laurasia and Gondwana) during the Early and early Middle Jurassic.

Pangaea had relatively little diversity, until the continent broke up and led to sauropod groups evolving in isolation through vicariance during the late Middle and Late Jurassic. Spinophorosaurus shows that features once thought to be derived among East Asian sauropods are rather plesiomorphic (ancestral traits) among eusauropods (eusauropods that colonised Laurasia retained the basal features also seen in Spinophorosaurus). The eusauropods which colonised South Gondwana were a specialised line of the group which had lost said ancestral features during isolation. Remes and colleagues noted that more evidence was needed to support these interpretations but were confident that there was a connection between Jurassic sauropods of North Africa, Europe, and East Asia.

As indicated by the anatomy of Spinophorosaurus and the pattern of Middle Jurassic sauropod distribution, important developments in sauropod evolution may have occurred in North Africa. It was close to the equator and had a summer-wet climate in the Early and Middle Jurassic, with high plant productivity and diversity. On the other hand, the sauropods of South Gondwana were isolated from the equatorial region by the Central Gondwanan Desert in the Early Jurassic, leading to differences in South and North Gondwanan floras. When the desert shrank in the late Middle Jurassic, neosauropods appeared and replaced the sauropod fauna that had been typical of the Middle Jurassic. Since Jobaria of North Africa is close to the base of Neosauropoda, and because neosauropods such as diplodocoids were widely distributed in the Upper Jurassic, neosauropods and some of their subgroups may also have originated in the equatorial region of Jurassic Pangaea, which may have acted as a "hot spot" in sauropod evolution. The Jurassic diversification of sauropods was possibly controlled by climatic zones and plant biogeography, rather than just continental differentiation. Vidal and colleagues suggested in 2020 that the wedged sarcral vertebrae and upward deflecected vertebral column of Spinophorosaurus was an ancestral feature of eusauropods that could also be identified in more derived sauropods. Since eusauropods with short necks and front legs, such as Dicraeosaurus, had wedged sacra, even they would have had upwards deflected vertebral columns in front of the sacrum.

== Palaeobiology ==
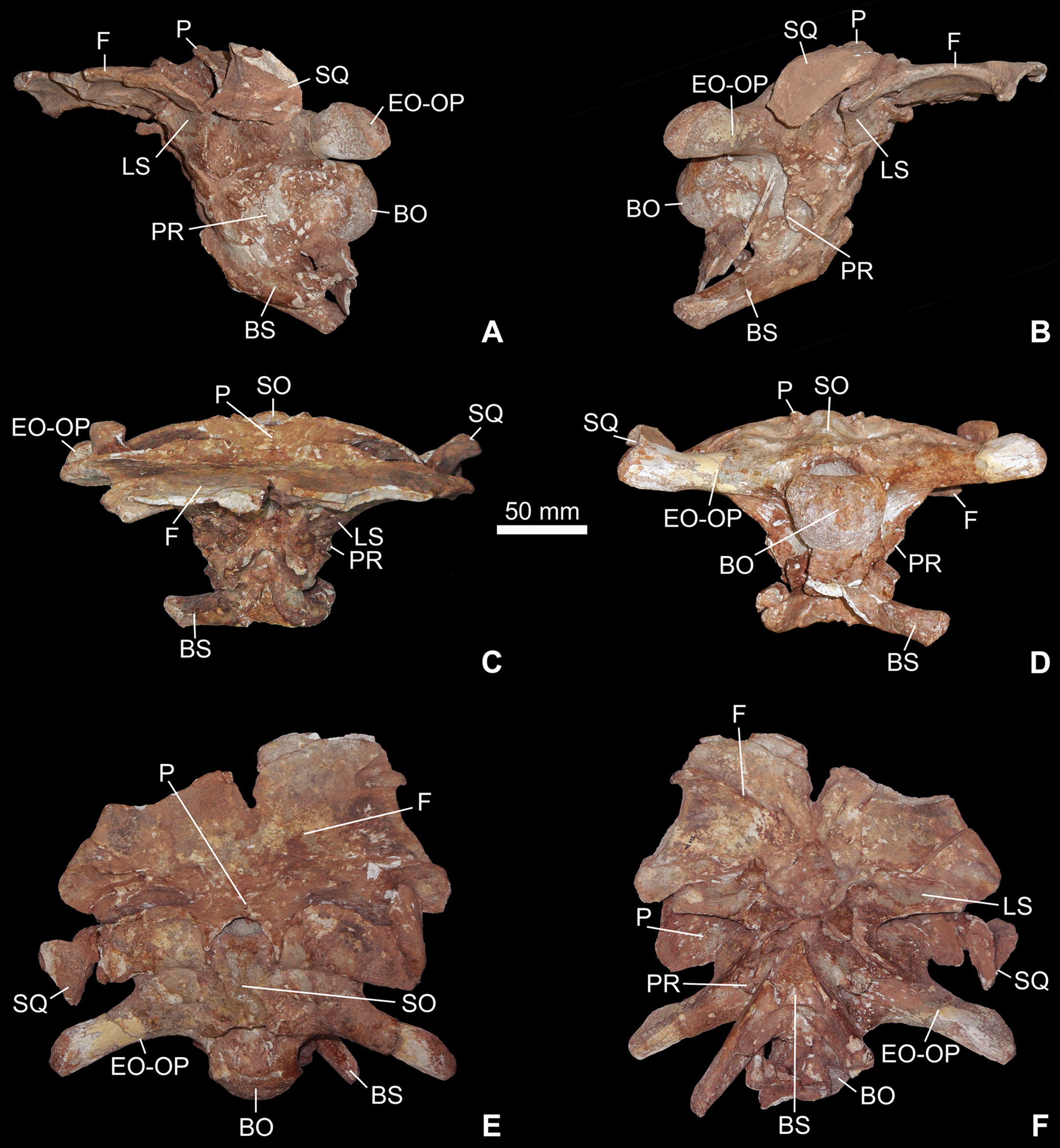
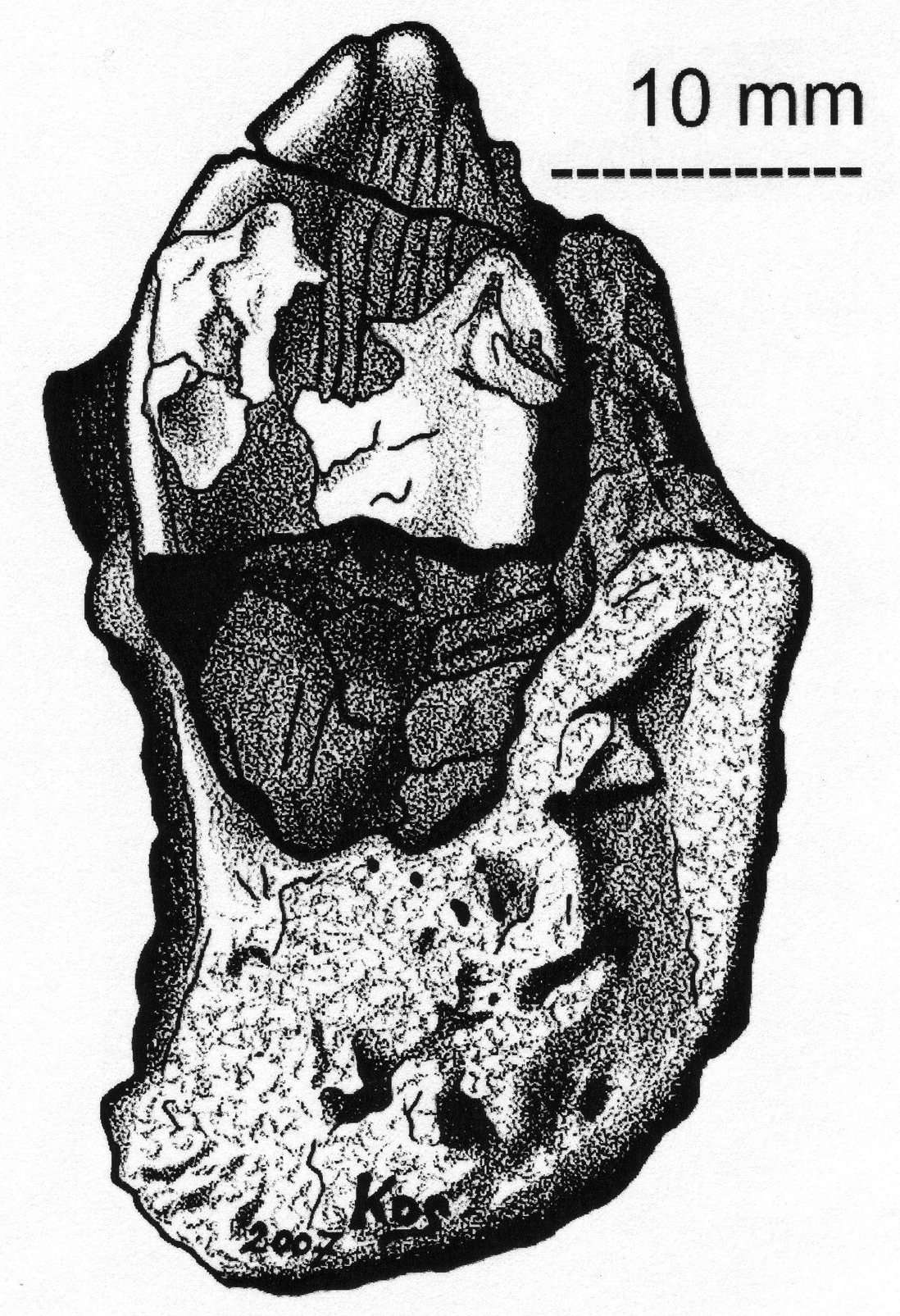
Braincase in multiple views (left), and dentary tooth of the paratype; note the enlarged, spaced denticles near the top of the crown

Spinophorosaurus and some other sauropodomorphs did not have reduced vestibular apparatuses, a sensory system for balance and orientation in the inner ear, though this might have been expected in a lineage that led to heavy, plant-eating quadrupeds. It is unknown why Spinophorosaurus retained this feature, but the size and morphology of sauropodomorph labyrinths may be related to neck length and mobility, for example. It is possible expansion of the vestibular apparatus is an indicator of the importance of vision and coordinated eye, head, and neck movements, though interpretation of sauropod vestibular features are still uncertain.

At a 2018 conference, Benjamin Jentgen-Ceschino and colleagues reported radial fibrolamellar bone (RFB), a type of bone tissue characterised by radially oriented channels, in the outermost part of the cortex (the outermost bone layer) of the humerus belonging to an adult Spinophorosaurus specimen and a young adult Isanosaurus. Normally, the cortex in the long bones of sauropods shows a fibrolamellar complex instead. RFB is considered to be fast growing bone tissue, and has not been reported in sauropods before. Its presence in the outermost cortex is unusual, as it would usually be expected in the innermost cortex (corresponding to juvenile growth). The RFB of the Spinophorosaurus was buried in the outer cortex, followed by a normal fibrolamellar complex, which indicates the animal survived for some time after its accelerated growth, which probably suggests pathological bone growth due to injury.

=== Motion ===
Since Spinophorosaurus is one of the most completely known basal sauropods, it is a good model for biomechanical studies that help to understand sauropod biology and the function of anatomical features. Manipulation of the 3D model by Vidal and colleagues in 2015 showed that each of the frontmost 20 tail vertebrae could deflect up to 20º, and 8–10º in sideways flexion, before limited by the bone morphology. The actual range of movement in a live animal would have been smaller, as the soft tissue as well as the large chevron bones would have been a limiting factor. The first 20 tail vertebrae also became longer towards the end of the tail, as seen in diplodocids, and were powered by enlarged hypaxial musculature, as indicated by the large chevron bones and upwards-angled transverse processes in the first tail vertebrae. Movement in the rear part of the tail was limited as the chevrons were overlapping, as is also the case in dromaeosaurids and ankylosaurids. Together, these features of the tail may have been part of a specialised function, which is unknown. Joger and colleagues argued in 2009 that the supposed spikes formed a thagomiser at the end of the tail that would have been used for defence against predators.

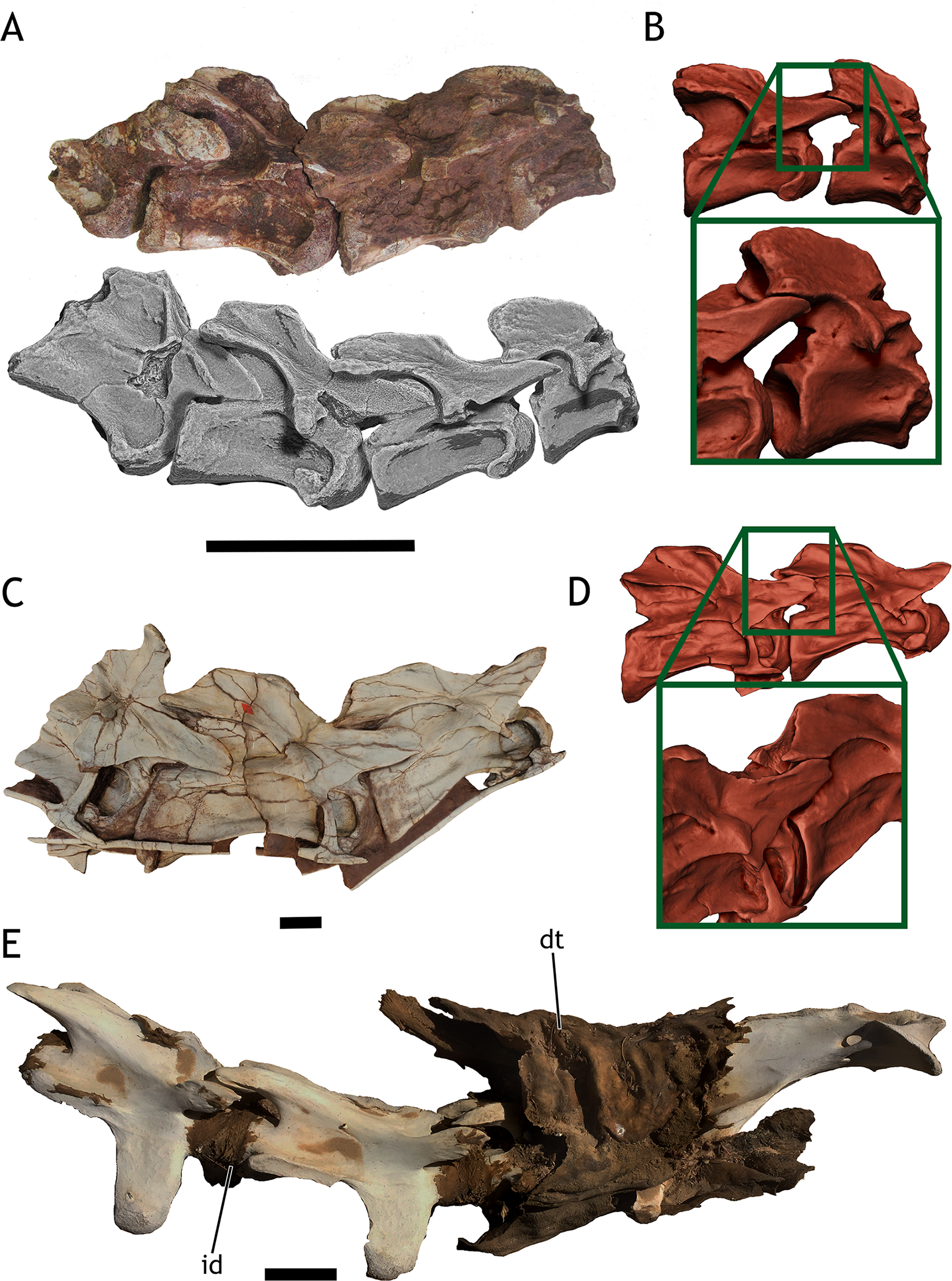
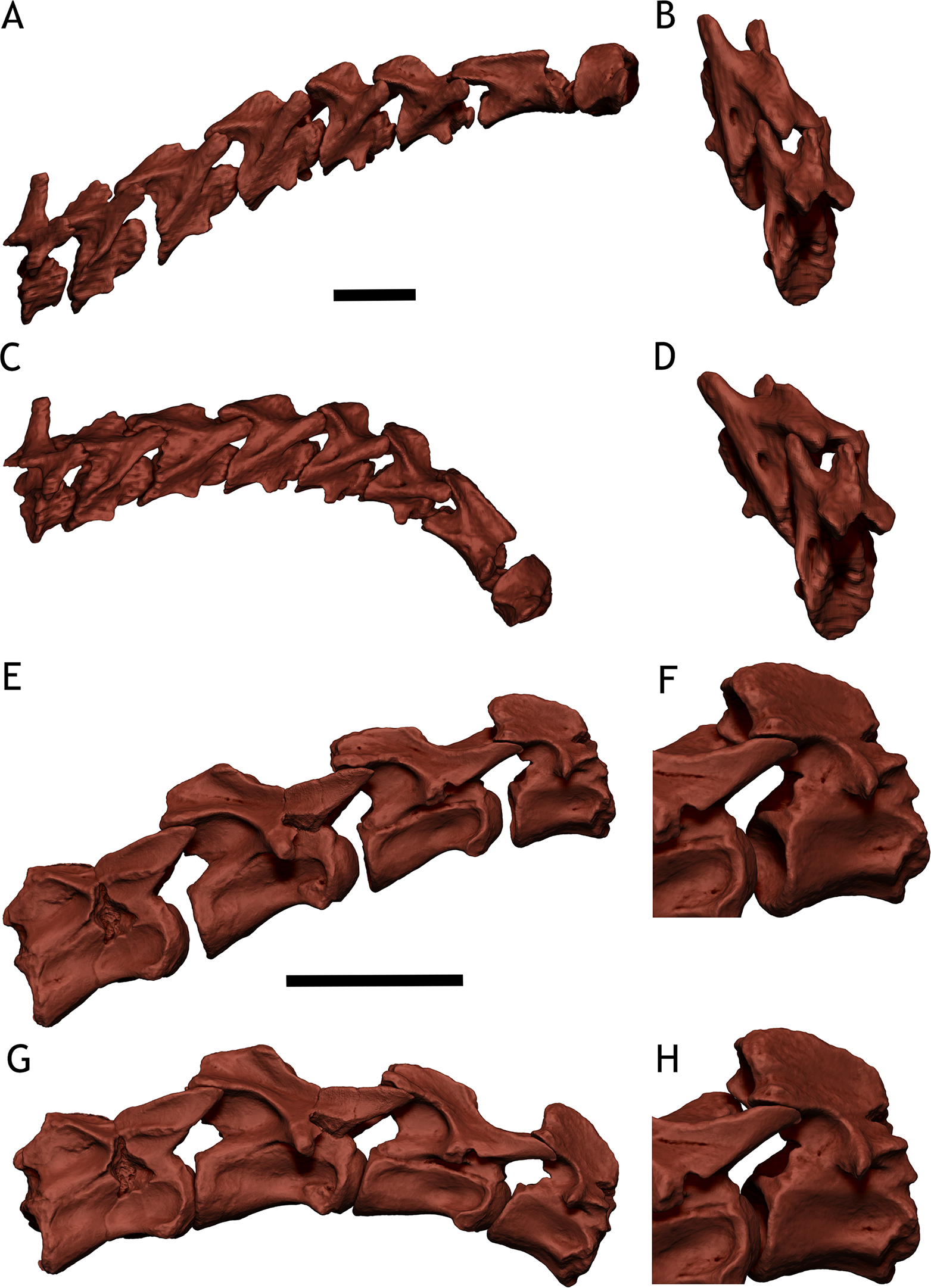
Comparison between the vertebrae of Spinophorosaurus and a giraffe and their posture (right)

In 2017, John Fronimos and Jeffrey Wilson used Spinophorosaurus as a model to study how the complexity of neurocentral sutures (the rigid joint connecting the neural arch of a vertebra to its centrum) in sauropods may have contributed to the strength of the spine. Sauropods reached their often enormous body sizes by both rapid and extended growth. As long as an individual was growing, the neurocentral sutures were composed of cartilage to permit this growth. Upon reaching full body size, this cartilage would turn into bone, closing the suture. Cartilage, however, is much less resistant to forces that could potentially dislocate the neural arch, such as bending and torsion; these become especially relevant at large body sizes. Sauropods and other archosauriforms counteract this structural weakness by increasing the complexity of the suture, meaning that the surfaces that connect the neural arch to its centrum had complex ridges and furrows that interlocked. In Spinophorosaurus, suture complexity was most pronounced in the front part of the trunk, indicating that stresses were highest in this region, probably because of the weight of the long neck and rib cage. Complexity became weaker towards the skull and the sacrum. The orientation of the ridges allows for identifying the type of stress that affected the vertebra: In the neck vertebrae, ridges would mainly have prohibited dislocation of the neural arch in a front-to-back direction, while the ridges in the trunk vertebrae were more effective in impeding rotation.

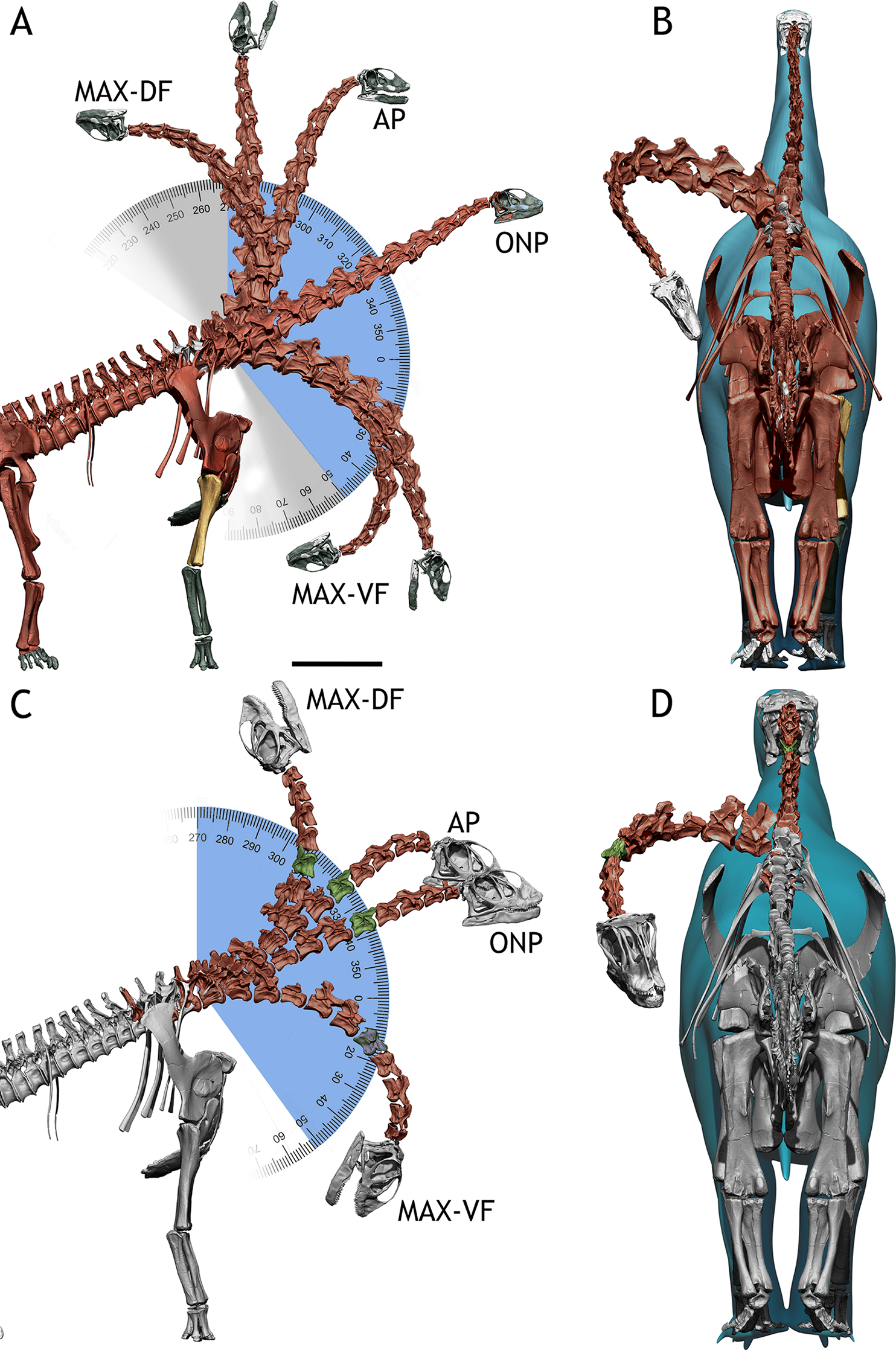
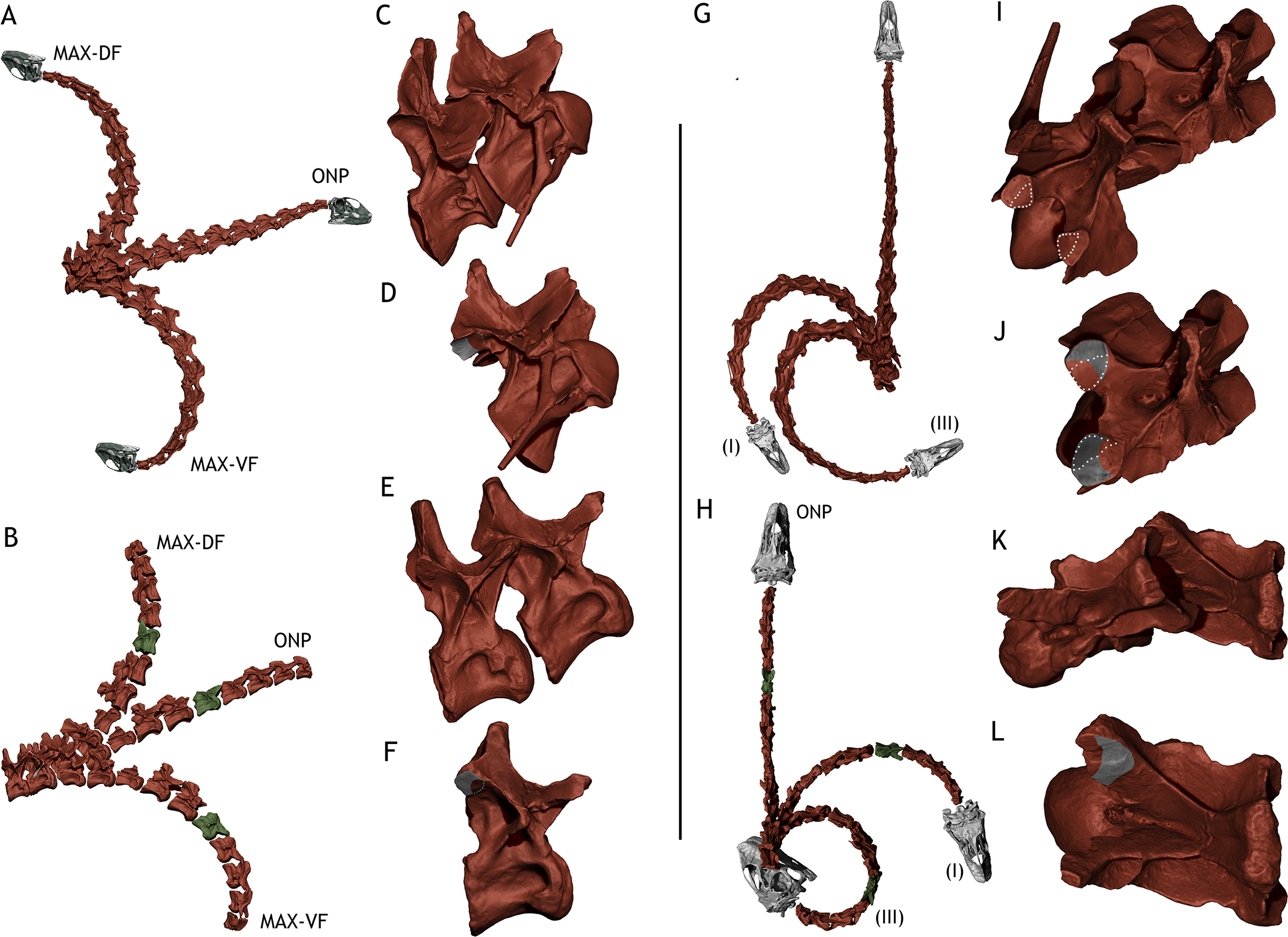
3D models showing possible up-down and sideways neck posture flexion in a subadult (A-B left, A-G right) and juvenile (C-D left, B-H right) Spinophorosaurus

In a 2018 conference abstract, Vidal used the virtual Spinophorosaurus skeleton to test hypothetical mating postures that have been proposed for sauropods that would involve a "cloacal kiss" (as is performed by most birds) rather than a male intromittent organ. Such hypotheses include "leg over back", the male mounting from behind (with the female standing or lying down), as well as "backwards mating". Postures that resulted in dislocation or osteological stops were not considered feasible. The "leg over back" posture was rejected, since it would be impossible for a standing male to reach its leg over the back and hip of a crouching female, even if it was half the size of the male (and it is unknown if sauropods were sexually dimorphic in size). The posture wherein the male mounted the female from behind while resting its front legs on the back of the female was possible (the tail was flexible enough to get out of the way), but even if the female was lying down, the cloacae would not approach each other close enough for a "cloacal kiss". The "cloacal kiss" would only be possible through "backwards mating", wherein the male and female approached each other backwards and joined their cloacae with their tails flexed sideways, and movement of the legs would allow individuals of different sizes to mate this way. "Backwards mating" is the only way sauropods could have mated without the need of a male intromittent organ. Such a pose is common in mating arthropods and in the "tied"-phase of mating carnivoran mammals such as Canis.

Video presenting the revised posture of Spinophorosaurus based on a digital reconstruction of the skeleton

Vidal and colleagues, in 2020, used 3D models of both the holotype and the juvenile skeleton to estimate the range of motion (flexibility) of the neck. Such estimates assume that the original distance between vertebrae can be reliably predicted, and that the articular processes stay in contact at all times. Vidal and colleagues demonstrated that both assumptions indeed hold true in modern giraffes, increasing confidence in range of motion estimates in extinct animals in general. As Spinophorosaurus grew, the range of motion of the neck would increase (making steeper neck postures possible); the gap between vertebrae become larger; and the neck become more inclined in neutral posture. Similar changes during growth are also observed in giraffes. The neck would have been as flexible as that of giraffes thanks to the higher number of vertebrae, even though the individual joints were much less flexible than in giraffes.

According to this study, Spinophorosaurus would possibly have been able to feed using the same postures as giraffes, and it could have been the most basal sauropod adapted for high browsing. High browsing is also suggested by anatomical features, including the narrow snout, broad teeth, and proportionally long humerus compared to the scapula. As in the giraffe, both the juvenile and grown Spinophorosaurus individual would not have been able to reach the ground just by lowering their necks, and possibly splayed their forelimbs for drinking. While sleeping, giraffes bend their necks sideways against the body. Although the vertebral articulations would have been flexible enough for such bending in Spinophorosaurus, it might have been prohibited by the elongated cervical ribs. Also in 2020, Vidal and colleagues added that the more vertical posture and greater upwards and downwards motion revealed by the digital model also supported high browsing abilities in Spinophorosaurus. High-browing therefore appears to be a basal feature within Eusauropoda, and the body proportions of non-sauropod sauropodomorphs indicate they were medium height browsers.

== Palaeoenvironment ==
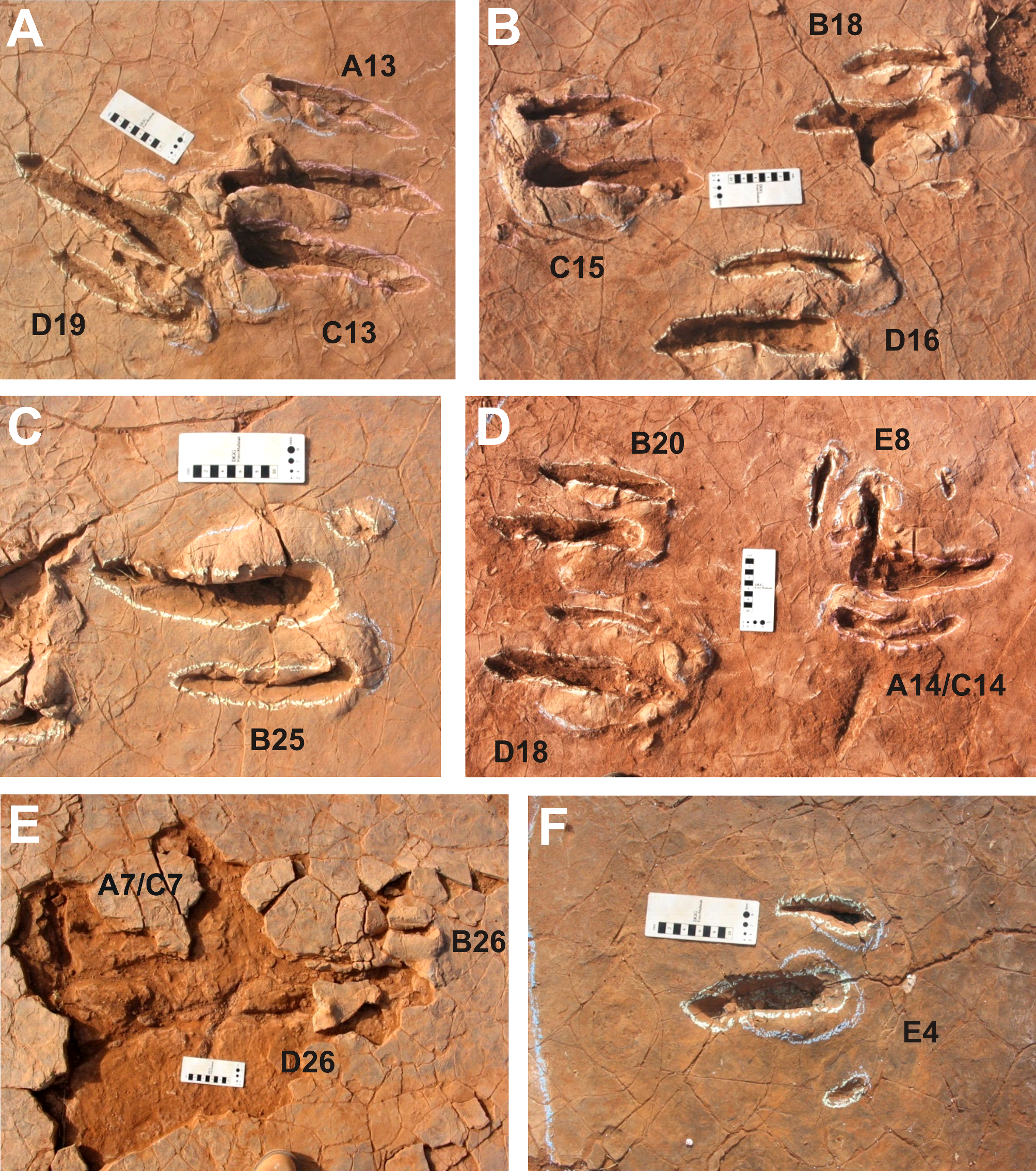
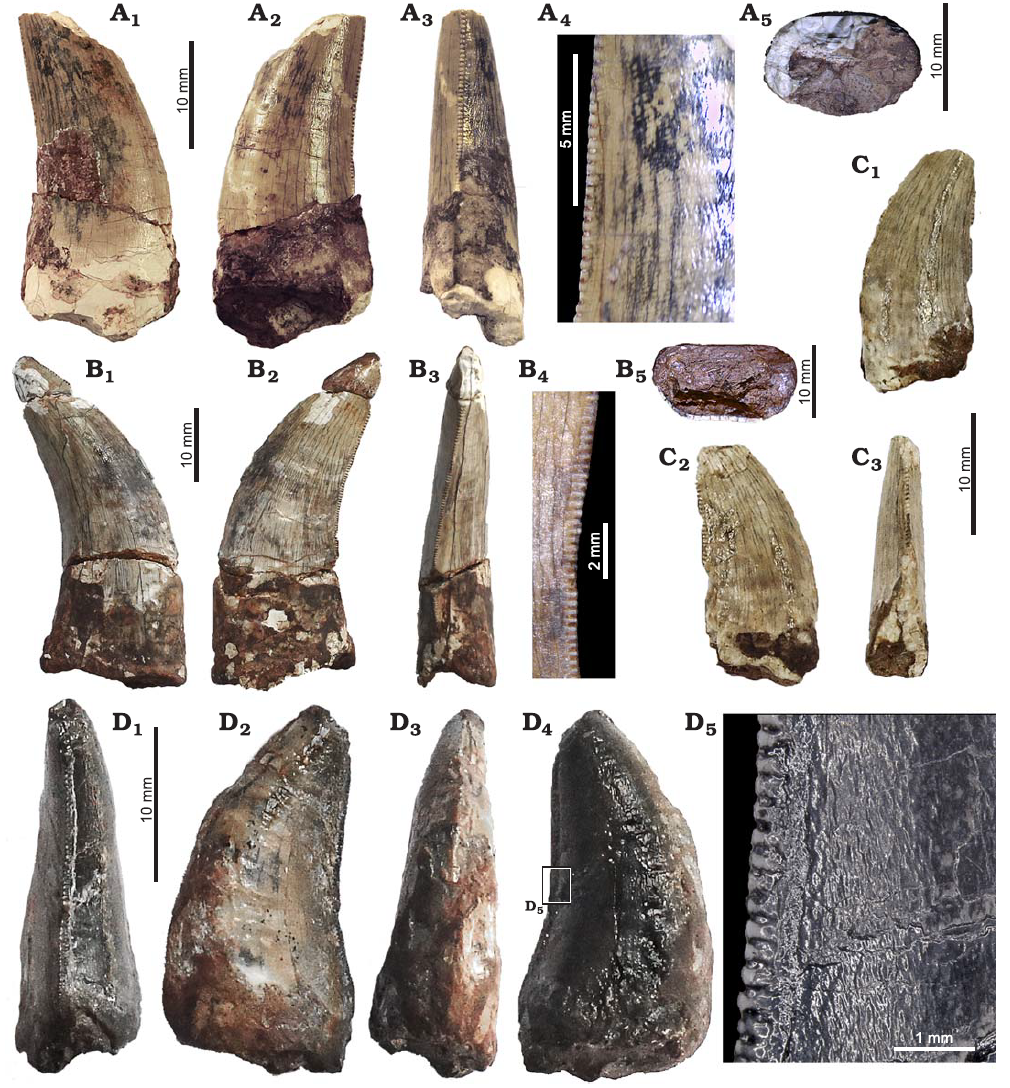
Two-toed theropod tracks found near the Spinophorosaurus specimens (left), and four theropod teeth found with the holotype (right)

Spinophorosaurus is known from the Irhazer Shale of Niger, which has been determined to represent the base of the Irhazer Group (based on the presence of red clay that show interbedded sand beds with traces of subaerial exposure and dinosaur footprints), which is stratigraphically below the outcrops of the Tegama Group. The Irhazer Group was earlier considered Jurassic to earliest Cretaceous in age, as the overlying Tiourarén Formation was once considered to be of Lower Cretaceous age. Subsequent studies have found the latter formation to be Middle Jurassic to early Late Jurassic. The stratigraphical and phylogenetic position of Spinophorosaurus (compared with other basal sauropods from around the world) indicates it could be Middle Jurassic (Bajocian–Bathonian) in age. Since the strata of the Irhazer Group cannot yet be directly dated, it might be as old as Lower Jurassic. The lower limit is defined by the underlying Agadez Group, which is Upper Triassic in age (based on the presence of Chirotherium trace fossils).

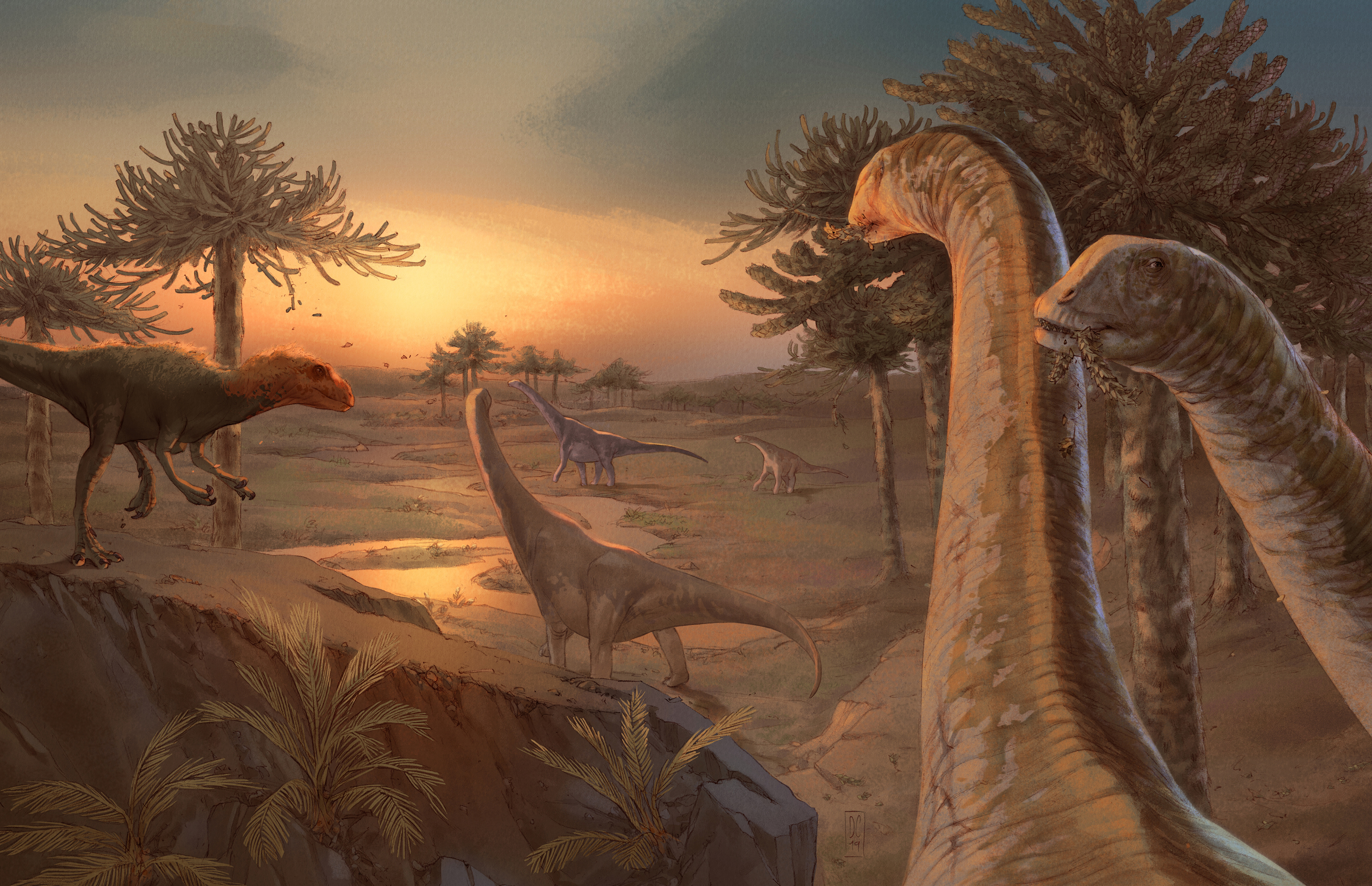
Life restoration showing Spinophorosaurus group in environment

The Spinophorosaurus skeletons were discovered in a massive to finely laminated red siltstone, whose matrix contained some carbonate. The fossils were recovered from the upper half of this several metres-thick siltstone layer. The layers there are subhorizontal, bearing minor faults, and commonly contain palaeosoils and carbonate at the top of the unity (about a metre above the level with the skeletons). Sediments of the Irhazer Group were deposited under conditions that were fluvio-lacustrine (associated with rivers and lakes), during a time when the Iullemmeden Basin was part of a great river-valley system, which was connected with the Proto-Atlantic coast of Gondwana through adjacent basins.

Four theropod teeth were found closely associated with the Spinophorosaurus holotype (by a vertebra, pubis, and in the acetabulum); three had similarities with Megalosauridae and Allosauridae, while the fourth belongs to what may be one of the earliest known members of Spinosauridae. The fact that the teeth are poorly preserved while the Spinophorosaurus skeleton is well-preserved indicates that the teeth were transported before being buried with the sauropod. Dinosaur tracks were found some hundred metres away from the Spinophorosaurus site, including a trackway of six footprints from a mid-sized sauropod as well as 120 well-preserved didactyl (two-toed) theropod footprints. The didactyl tracks were originally thought to have been left by paravian theropods (such as dromaeosaurs or troodontids, which have two weight-bearing toes), but were subsequently interpreted as having been produced by swimming theropods (explaining why one toe did not leave a trace).
