= Aderbissinat =

- Commune
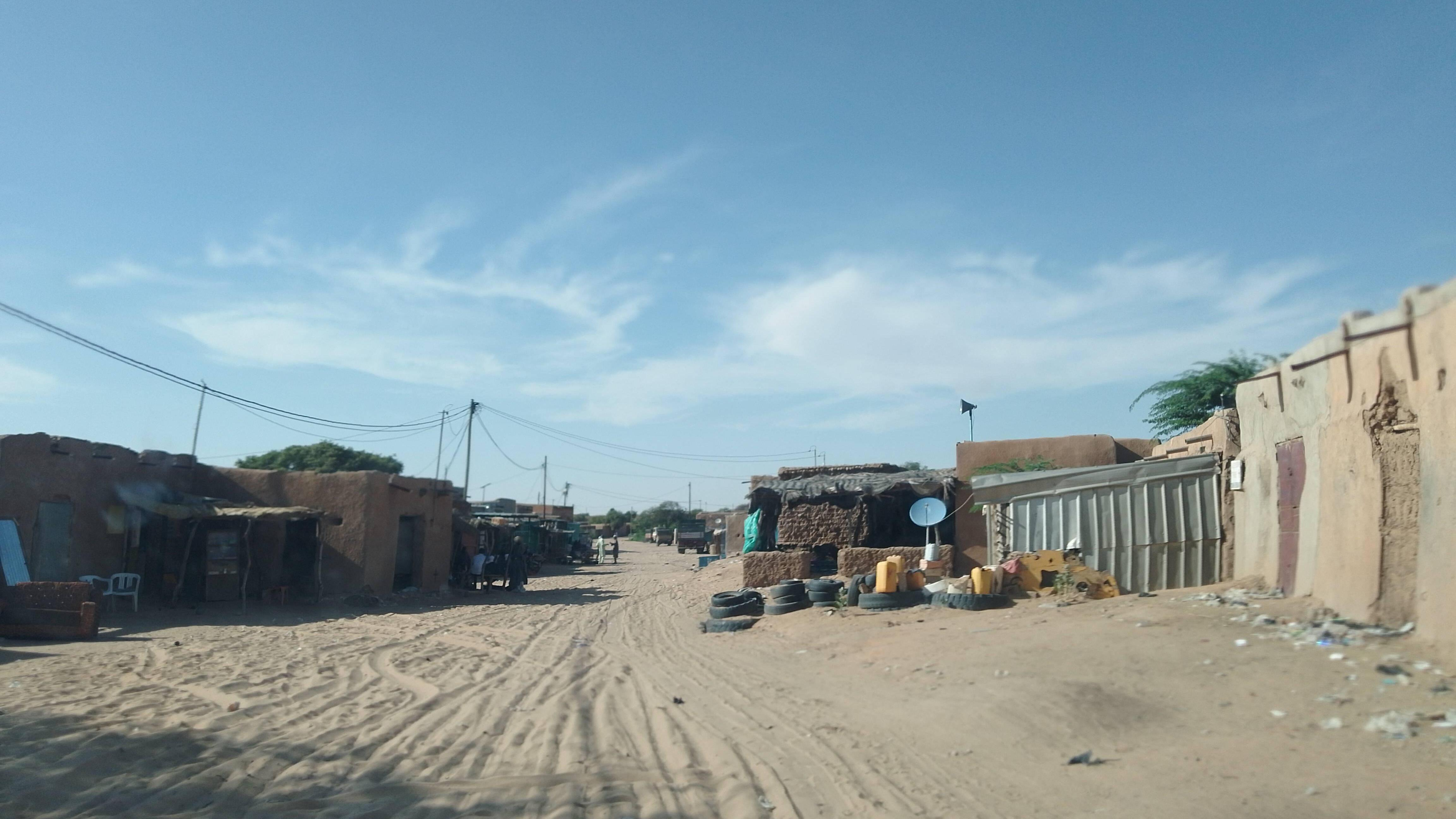

- Location in Niger
- Coordinates: 15°37′12″N 7°53′32″E
- Country: Niger
- Region: Agadez Region
- Department: Tchirozerine

Area
  - Commune: 51,358 km^{2} (19,829 sq mi)
- Elevation: 456 m (1,496 ft)

Population (2012)
  - Commune: 35,320
  - Density: 0.6877/km^{2} (1.781/sq mi)
  - Urban: 4,672

Aderbissinat is a department, town and commune in central Niger. As of 2012, the commune population was 35,320. It lies in the Sahel, the semi-arid, sparsely populated zone between the Sahara Desert to the north and the millet-growing savannah to the south. Raising goats, camels, and cattle is the traditional livelihood for people in this region, which gets only a few weeks of rain per year. However, recurrent drought since the 1970s has caused the starvation of many animals. This has forced many previously nomadic and semi-nomadic people to settle in and around Aderbissinat and other Sahelian towns. Villages within Aderbissinat include Marendet.

Aderbissinat is ethnically and linguistically mixed, with residents of Hausa, Tuareg. Nomadic Fula cattle-herders also come into town regularly to sell their wares. Although isolated, the town lies on a major trans-Saharan route linking Algeria to Nigeria. The nearest cities are Agadez to the north and Zinder to the south.

The mayor of Aderbissinat is Mohamed Echika, who has supported the Niger Project SNHM into the investigations into a new sauropod dinosaur Spinophorosaurus nigerensis. Mr Echika has also been a guest of honour at the Tribunal de las Aguas in Valencia, Spain in 2005, which has since become safeguarded by UNESCO.
