= Marendet =

- Town
- Location in Niger
- Coordinates: 16.372851°N 7.426758°E
- Country: Niger
- Town and commune: Aderbissinat

Marendet is a village and archaeological site in central Niger. It was an important stop on a 9th and 10th century trade route linking Wagadu to Egypt through Gao. It was also a source of copper. The archaeological site is now at risk from erosion and looting.
